= Boyerstown =

Townland in County Meath, Ireland

Coordinates: 53°38′06″N 6°45′03″W

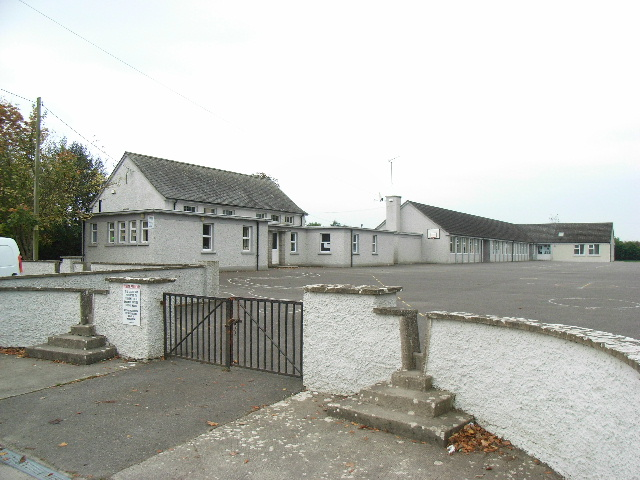
St Joseph's National School, Boyerstown

Boyerstown (Irish: Baile Bháigh) is a townland in County Meath, Ireland. It is located off the N51 national secondary road 5 kilometres (3 mi) southwest of Navan. The M3 motorway runs through the townland.

The parish of Boyerstown, along with another parish called Cortown, historically has been linked to the neighbouring parish of Bohermeen, with the parish priest and curate serving all three parishes.

== See also ==
- Ardbraccan
- Ardbraccan House
- Durhamstown Castle
- List of towns and villages in Ireland
