= 1908 in architecture =

The year 1908 in architecture involved some significant architectural events and new buildings.

== Events ==
- April 6 – The foundation stone of Knox College, Otago, is laid.
- St. Mary's Church, Wellingborough, England, is designed by Ninian Comper.
- The Georgian Society is founded in Dublin on 21 February 1908 by John Pentland Mahaffy, Walter G. Strickland and Richard Orpen.

== Buildings and structures ==
=== Buildings opened ===
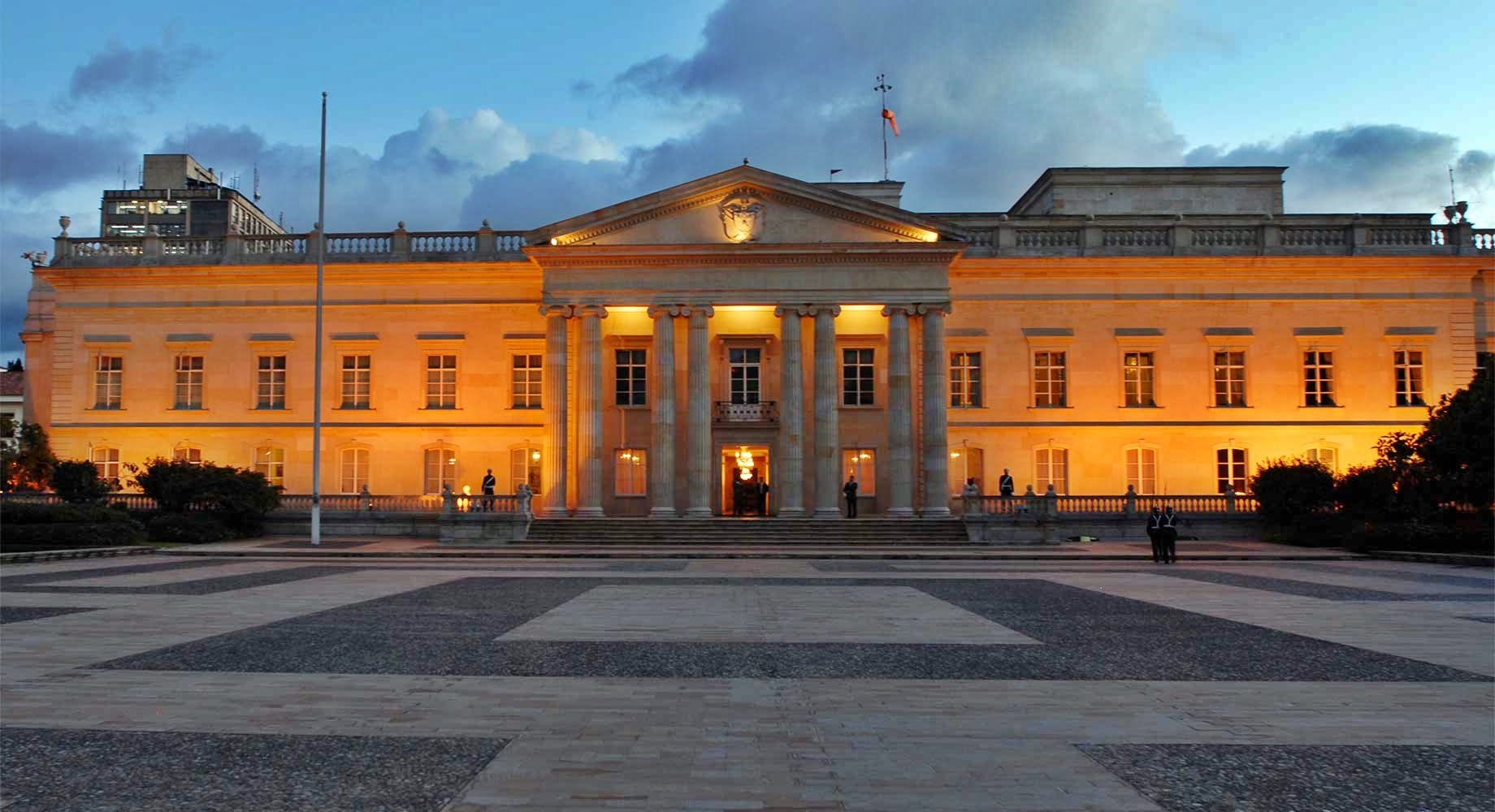
Casa de Nariño in Bogotá, Colombia

- May 1 – Singer Building in New York City, completed with tower, designed by Ernest Flagg. It is the world's tallest building for a year. Demolished 1968.
- July 20 – Casa de Nariño, official residence of the President of Colombia, Bogotá, Colombia, designed by Gastón Lelarge.
- November 8 – Chamber of Commerce and Industry of Meurthe-et-Moselle in Nancy, France, designed by Emile Toussaint and Louis Marchal and featuring ironwork by Louis Majorelle and stained glass by Jacques Gruber.

=== Buildings completed ===
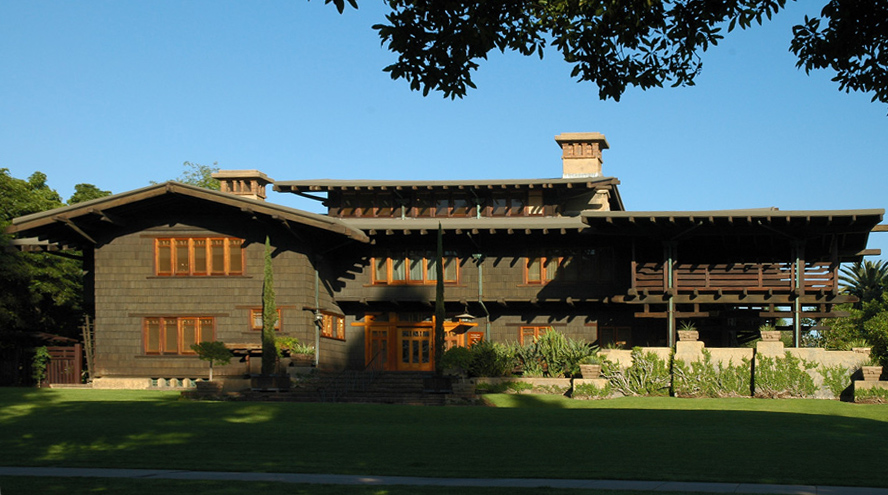
Gamble House

- The Gamble House in Pasadena, California, designed by Henry Mather Greene and Charles Sumner Greene.
- British Medical Association Building, London, designed by Charles Holden with sculptures by Jacob Epstein, is completed.
- St. Andrew's United Church in Cairo, Egypt.
- St. Patrick's Church, Toronto, Canada, designed by Arthur W. Holmes.
- Sint-Petrus-en-Pauluskerk, Ostend, Belgium, designed by Louis Delacenserie.
- Unity Temple, Oak Park, Illinois, United States, designed by Frank Lloyd Wright.
- Old Colony Club on Madison Avenue in New York City, designed by Stanford White of McKim, Mead & White.

== Awards ==
- RIBA Royal Gold Medal – Honore Daumet

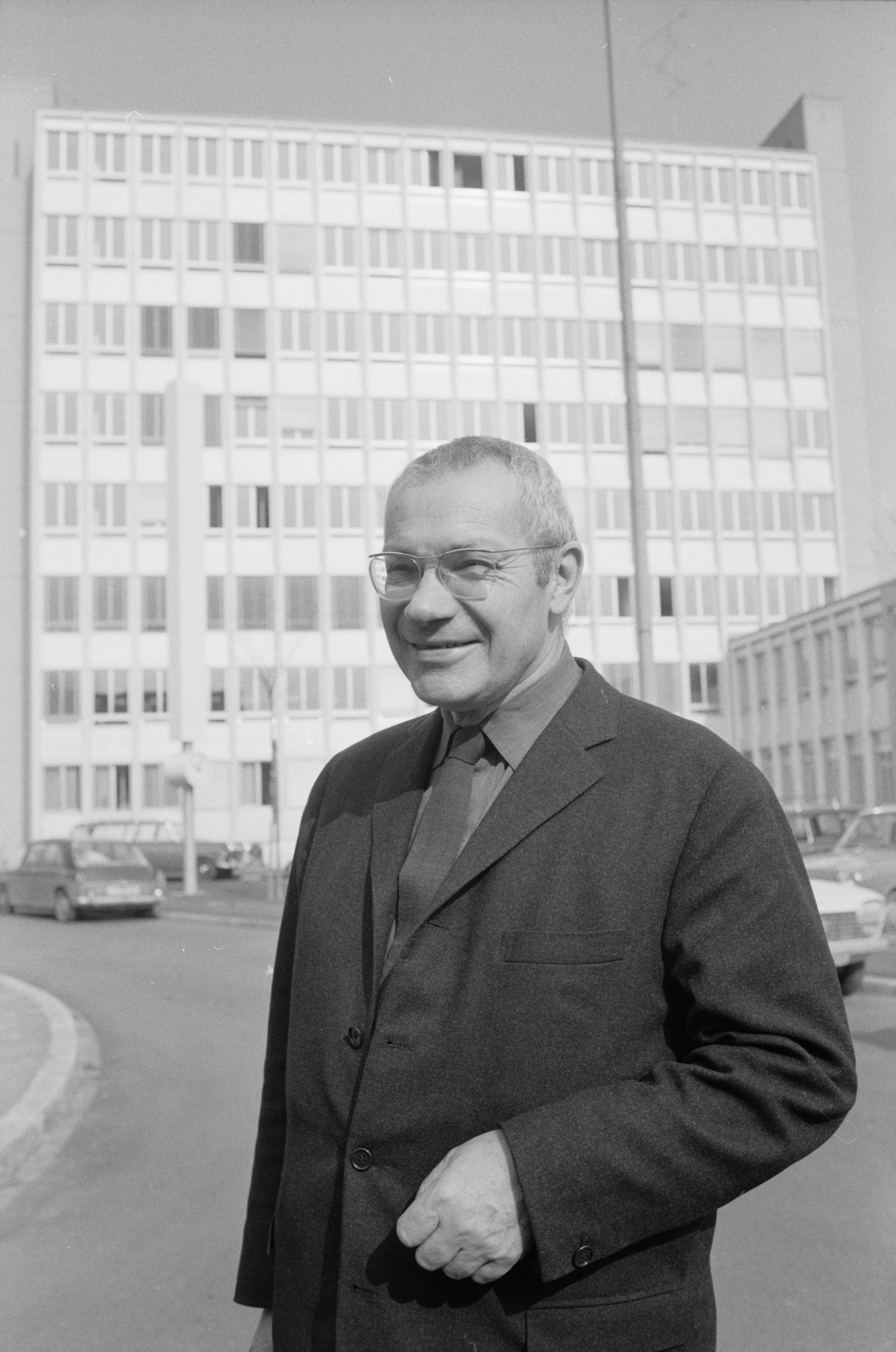
Max Bill

== Births ==
- January 7 – Frederick Gibberd, English architect (died 1984)
- May 23 – Max Abramovitz, American architect (died 2004)
- October 13 – Francis Skinner, Malaysian-born English architect (died 1998)
- December 22 – Max Bill, Swiss architect, painter, typeface designer, industrial designer and graphic designer (died 1994)

== Deaths ==
- January 2 – Alexander Davidson, Scottish architect active in Australia, 68
- February 3 – Ferdinand Meldahl, Danish architect best known for the reconstruction of Frederiksborg Palace, 80
- February 13 – Sir James Knowles, English architect and editor, 76
- September 15 – Friedrich Adler, German architect and archaeologist, 80
- November 26 – William Swinden Barber, English architect, 76
