= Jim Duffy (journalist) =

Irish journalist

Jim Duffy (born 12 April 1966) is an Irish historian and political commentator who served as a policy advisor to Fine Gael then-leader of the Opposition, Enda Kenny prior to the 2011 general election. He first achieved prominence in 1990 when the contents of his on-the-record interview with then Tánaiste Brian Lenihan, in which Lenihan admitted making calls to the residence of the Irish president seeking to speak to President Hillery to urge him to refuse a Dáil dissolution in controversial circumstances (something he had previously denied), led to Lenihan's dismissal from government, his defeat in that year's Irish presidential election and the unexpected election of the left wing liberal Mary Robinson as President of Ireland.

Duffy was one of six people chosen to submit international reports on heads of state to Australia's Republic Advisory Committee in 1993. He was an occasional contributor to The Irish Times and the Sunday Independent, and a columnist in Magill magazine, as well as appearing on radio and television prior to his appointment to Kenny's office, but has ceased all media work since that date.

== Origins ==
Duffy was born in Drogheda in Meath in 1966. His family are long-term residents of the townland of Durhamstown in the civil parish of Ardbraccan outside Navan in County Meath. On his maternal side, through his mother Bernadette Duffy (née Cadden) he is descended from Ballydurrow, in Munterconnaught, County Cavan.

Jim Duffy was educated in Bohermeen National School and St. Patrick's Classical School in Navan, where his classmates included the journalist Simon Cumbers (who was killed by Al Qaeda in Saudi Arabia in 2004). In 1984 Duffy began to study History and Politics in University College Dublin, achieving a 2:1 degree in 1987. He received a first class honours degree for his post-graduate thesis on the presidency of Ireland in 1991.

== Lenihan Interview ==
In 1990 as part of his postgraduate thesis for his Master of Arts in Political Science Duffy interviewed senior politicians, one of whom was the then Tánaiste, Brian Lenihan. The on-the-record interview, in May 1990, formed one source for a major series of articles on the presidency of Ireland, published in The Irish Times in September 1990. In the interview Lenihan confirmed what he had previously confirmed to other writers over eight years, that on 27 January 1982 he, along with party leader Charles Haughey and a colleague, Sylvester Barrett, had repeatedly phoned Áras an Uachtaráin, the residence of the President of Ireland, to try to put pressure on the President, Patrick Hillery, to refuse a dissolution of parliament to the Taoiseach (prime minister), Dr Garret FitzGerald. (FitzGerald's government had just been defeated in Dáil Éireann in a vote on the budget.)

In October 1990, in the midst of the presidential election, FitzGerald was to be a guest, alongside Lenihan, on RTÉ One's Questions and Answers political debate programme. He has previously issued a press release about the phone calls issue, but it had received no publicity. He decided to raise the issue of the calls again on the programme, given that in the preceding week Lenihan changed his story of eight years and had now denied twice, first in a student debate, then in an Irish Press interview with Emily O'Reilly, making any calls. When challenged on the programme Lenihan maintained that his October 1990 version was correct, denying that he had played "any hand, act of part" in attempts to pressurise President Hillery. FitzGerald had been in Áras an Uachtaráin on the night of the calls and had been told by the President's staff that Lenihan had persistently been making calls. FitzGerald aggressively challenged Lenihan, saying "I was in the Áras, Brian, and I know how many calls there were."

Aware that Lenihan had been one of Duffy's sources for the original article in September, with Duffy's permission the Irish Times ran a front-page story stating that Lenihan had made the calls he was now denying. In the resulting furore Lenihan's campaign manager Bertie Ahern either deliberately or accidentally revealed on a radio programme that Duffy had interviewed Lenihan. Duffy became the subject of mounting political and media pressure, with his silence being spun by Fianna Fáil press staff as evidence that the rumours that Lenihan had confirmed to him that he had made calls were false. (Lenihan had assured his campaign team that he had said nothing in the interview that could cause problems.) After three days of intense political and media pressure, Duffy released the relevant proportion of the on-the-record tape interview he had done with Lenihan. The release took place in a press conference in a Dublin hotel.

The release of the tape threw Lenihan's campaign into meltdown. Lenihan tried in a subsequent live television interview on the Six-One News to insist that what he had said to Duffy was wrong, insisting that "on mature recollection" his October 1990 version was the correct one, and all that he had said previously over eight years was incorrect. However his popularity plummeted by 18% overnight. The opposition Fine Gael party put down a Motion of No Confidence in the government. The Taoiseach, Charles Haughey, denied that Lenihan was under any pressure to resign. However, when the minority party in government, the Progressive Democrats, threatened to quit government unless Lenihan resigned or was sacked, and Lenihan refused to resign, the Taoiseach, Charles Haughey, instructed President Hillery to sack him. Lenihan went on to become the first candidate from his party ever to lose an Irish presidential election, with the Labour Party candidate, Mary Robinson, eventually winning the office.

Duffy was strongly attacked by the Taoiseach and members of the government under parliamentary privilege, with claims that his research was bogus and that he had been part of a secret plot to destroy Lenihan. However, his thesis on the presidency of Ireland was awarded a First Class honour by the National University of Ireland. He has written an account of the events of this period in the March 2006 edition of Magill magazine.

== Advising the Republic Advisory Committee ==
On the basis of his studies of international heads of state, Duffy was one of six people (including Sir Ellis Clarke, the former Governor-General and President of Trinidad and Tobago) commissioned in 1993 by Australia's Republic Advisory Committee to prepare reports on international republican experiences —to appear as an appendix to the committee's main report. His report, along with those of five others, was submitted as part of that larger report to the then Australian Prime Minister Paul Keating.

Duffy's recommendations formed a part of the debate in Australia on the possible move from being a monarchy to become a republic. His description of heads of state as fitting three distinct categories (chief executive, Nominal chief executive and Non-Executive) was widely used in the subsequent debate, and were referred to in major speeches by all sides in the debate.

During the constitutional referendum on creating a republic in 1999 Duffy in Australian media interviews was critical of the form of presidency being proposed, arguing in particular that the lack of security of tenure offered to the proposed office holder would seriously compromise the office holder's independence and ability to exercise their powers.

The 1999 referendum on declaring an Australian republic was ultimately defeated.

== Media and research work ==
During the 1990s and 2000s, Duffy worked as a researcher and as a political commentator for most major Irish publications, including The Irish Times, the Irish Independent, the Sunday Independent, the Sunday Times, the Sunday Tribune, The Sunday Business Post and the Irish Examiner. He also was a contributor to RTÉ radio and television, the BBC, UTV and Sky News. His contributions largely focused on politics, history, religion and current affairs.

He was a columnist with Magill magazine, Ireland'a major political and current affairs magazine, until October 2007 when he resigned to take up a research post in politics.

In April and May 2007 he was one of the main contributors to Uachtarán, an eight-part TG4 documentary on the office of President of Ireland.

== Political advisor ==
In May 2007, the Sunday Independent reported that Duffy had been appointed a Deputy Press Officer for Fine Gael for the duration of 2007 general election.

In October 2007 Duffy was appointed a policy officer in his office by the leader of Fine Gael, Enda Kenny. Duffy resigned his post as columnist with Magill magazine and since that date has ceased to do media work. His new role also involves participating in the National Forum on Europe, a government-created think-tank on the relationship between the European Union and Ireland.

== Writings on religion and gay marriage ==
He was a contributor to the Irish Times's Rite and Reason religious column on more than one occasion. One article in 1998, proposing the existence of Rites of Same Sex Union (in effect gay marriages) in early Christian prayerbooks up to mediaeval times, caused a controversy. The article has been republished on gay websites and some religious websites worldwide and has been quoted in debates on gay marriage in the United States, France, the Netherlands and has also featured in parliamentary debates in Ireland, including a submission in 2005 from a gay advocacy group to the Oireachtas All-Party Committee on the Constitution, which was exploring whether to amend the Constitution of Ireland to allow gay marriage.

== Bibliography ==
- John Downing, 'Most Skilful, Most Devious, Most Cunning' A political Biography of Bertie Ahern (Blackwater Press, 2004) ISBN 1-84131-687-3
- T. Ryle Dwyer, Short Fellow: A Biography of Charles J. Haughey (Marino, 1995) ISBN 1-86023-100-4
- Fergus Finlay, Snakes & Ladders (New Island Books, 1998) ISBN 1-874597-76-6
- Fergus Finlay, Mary Robinson: President with a Purpose (O'Brien Press, 1990) ISBN 0-86278-257-0
- Garret FitzGerald, All in a Life (Gill & Macmillan, 1991) ISBN 0-7171-1600-X
- Brian Lenihan, For the Record (Blackwater Press, 1991) ISBN 0-86121-362-9
- Olivia O'Leary & Helen Burke, Mary Robinson: The Authorised Biography (Hodder & Stoughton, 1998) ISBN 0-340-71738-6
- Raymond Smith, Garret: The Enigma (Aherlow Publishers) 1985 No ISBN
- Lorna Siggins, The Woman Who Took Power in the Park: Mary Robinson, President of Ireland, 1990–1997 (Mainstream Publishing, 1997) ISBN 1-85158-805-1
