= The Georgian Society =

Defunct architectural conservation society in Ireland

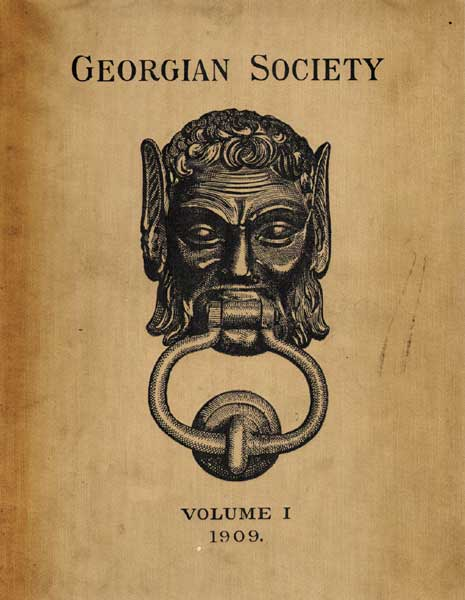
- Front cover of the Georgian Society records - Volume 1 (1909)
- Formation: 1908
- Founder: John Pentland Mahaffy; Walter G. Strickland; Richard Orpen
- Dissolved: 1915
- Headquarters: Royal Irish Academy, 19 Dawson Street
- Location: Dublin, Ireland
- Members: Open by subscription
- President: John Pentland Mahaffy

The Georgian Society was an architectural conservation and preservation organisation established by John Pentland Mahaffy, Walter G. Strickland and Richard Orpen on 21 February 1908 to promote and record Irish and primarily Dublin architectural and social history of the Georgian era and the long eighteenth century. The work and records of the society are regarded to be the seminal as well as first serious work detailing post 1700 Irish residential architecture.

The creation of the Irish Georgian Society in February 1958 was partly inspired by this earlier organisation.

== History ==
The society was established in February 1908 and had its inaugural meeting at the Royal Irish Academy on Dawson Street.

One of the core reasons for establishing the society was to promote and record architecture and design of the Georgian era and its aftermath, and to reinvigorate a sense of pride among the populace in high quality native craftsmanship. It was in this vein that Mahaffy remarked "Dublin is not a provincial town, but a fading capital".

The establishment of the society was a watershed moment marking a renewed interest and pride in Dublin and Ireland's Georgian architecture, heritage and housing both in Ireland and abroad and helped later spark the establishment of various successor societies, most notably the Irish Georgian Society and the UK based Georgian Group. Around the same time, other events such as the Dublin Civic Exhibition (1914) occurred, with a focus on urban development, planning and housing.

The society also helped to indirectly lay the foundations of modern architectural conservation and preservation societies and national trusts. Its subscription model with public voluntary contributions and active participation provided the framework off which many national trusts operate to the present day.

The society operated via a subscription of £1 and 1 shilling a year for which each member also received an annual edition of the Georgian Society Records. It originally only intended to last for a period of 5 years however, as the membership grew, so did attention to and interest in, the Georgian era. While the last official record was produced in 1913, a later unofficial edition dealing in more detail with Irish country houses was printed in 1915.

The cessation of the society coincided with the outbreak of World War I in 1914, the Easter Rising in 1916 and the decline of the gentry more generally in Britain and Ireland.

=== The Georgian Society Records ===
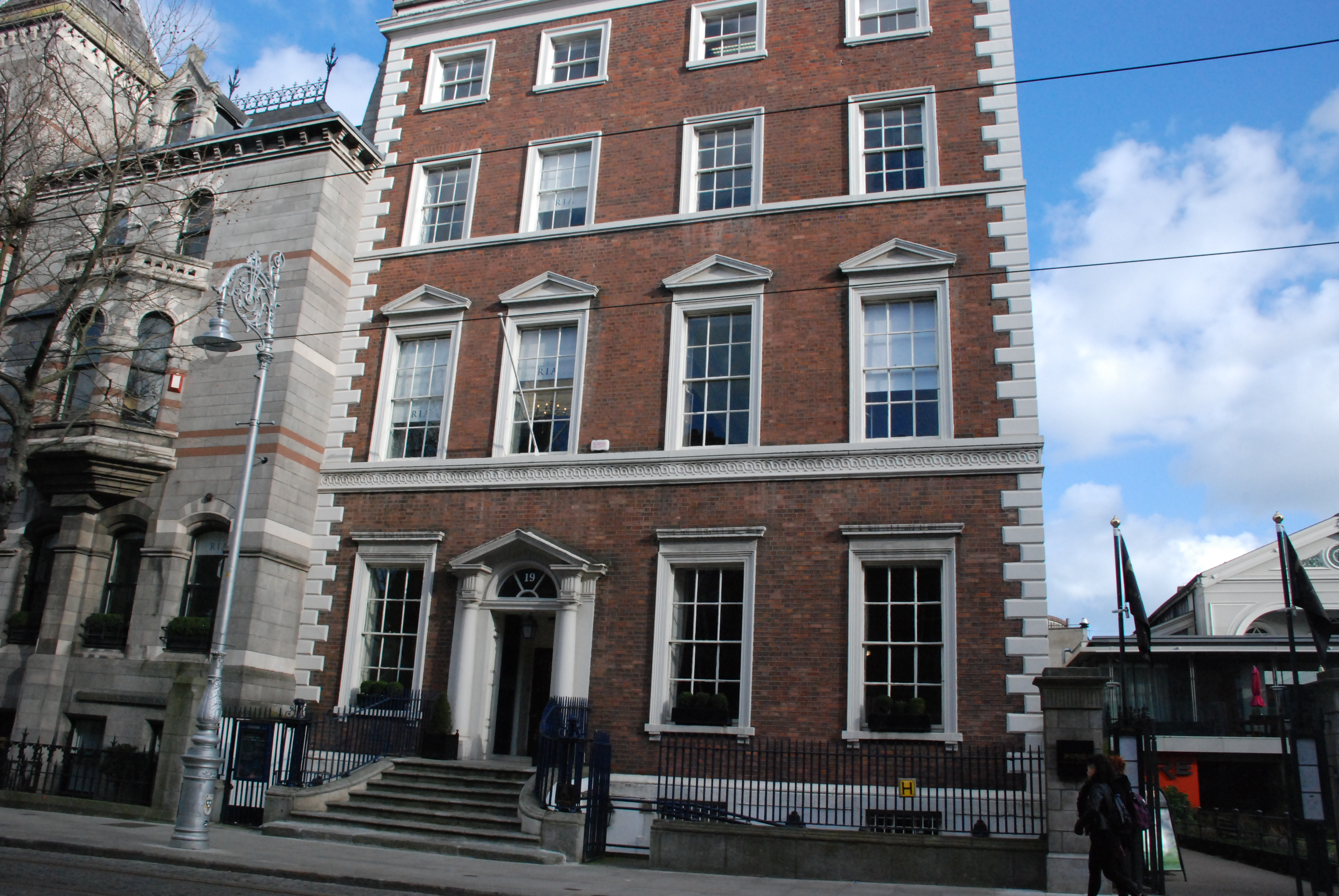
The society's de facto headquarters at the Royal Irish Academy, 19 Dawson Street.

The Georgian Society Records was a set of five heavily illustrated annual limited edition publications released in book form to members of the Georgian Society between 1909 and 1913. The records were published by the Dublin University Press and printed at the Printing House by Ponsonby & Gibbs.

The collection sets out in detail the social and economic position of Ireland and particularly Dublin during the Georgian era, mainly for the aristocratic classes. The records are heavily laden with prints, sketches, illustrations and photographic plates as well as measurements which help to form the architectural detail around which the text is written. As well as architectural and social observations, the records also include directories and addresses of current subscribers and notable figures of the era thus also acting as a quasi magazine, social networking directory and year book for the Ascendancy. The volumes are notably descriptive and appealing to the layman rather than overly analytical and overtly technical. The layout is at times notably meandering and without focus resulting in patchy coverage of some areas and styles while the scope and chronology are also at times vague. This failing is largely as a result of the broad target to which the writers were given the target of appealing to.

Although only several hundred copies of the original books were printed, a reprint was undertaken by the self-appointed successor Irish Georgian Society and Desmond Guinness in 1969.

A detailed breakdown of some of the core items in each yearbook is presented below.

| Volume | Title | Year | Copies | Authors | Contents |
|---|---|---|---|---|---|
| 1 | Records of Eighteenth-century Domestic Architecture and Decoration in Dublin | 1909 | 300 | John Pentland Mahaffy Walter Strickland; Richard Orpen | |
| 2 | Records of Eighteenth-century Domestic Architecture and Decoration in Dublin | 1910 | 400 | John Pentland Mahaffy Walter Strickland; Richard Orpen | |
| 3 | Records of Eighteenth-century Domestic Architecture and Decoration in Dublin | 1911 | 550 | John Pentland Mahaffy Walter Strickland; Richard Orpen | |
| 4 | Records of Eighteenth-century Domestic Architecture and Decoration in Dublin | 1912 | 550 | John Pentland Mahaffy Walter Strickland; Richard Orpen | |
| 5 | Records of Eighteenth-century Domestic Architecture and Decoration in Dublin | 1913 | 600 | John Pentland Mahaffy Walter Strickland; Richard Orpen | Mount Ievers Court, County Clare Rossanagh, County Wicklow; Bellamont House, County Cavan; Castletown House, County Kildare; Summerhill House, County Meath; Carton House, County Kildare; Russborough House, County Wicklow; Castletown Cox, County Kilkenny; Rathfarnham Castle, County Dublin |
| 6 | Georgian Mansions in Ireland | 1915 | 700 | Page Lawrence Dickinson Thomas Ulick Sadlier | |

=== Georgian Mansions in Ireland (1915) ===
A later sixth volume titled Georgian Mansions in Ireland was printed in 1915 in the same style and format by related individuals, namely Page Lawrence Dickinson, joint secretary of the Georgian Society and Thomas Ulick Sadlier, member of the editorial committee of the Georgian Society, however it was not authored directly under the auspices of the society. It was also produced as a limited edition of 700 copies and contained details of the following properties;

- I - Evolution and Development of Georgian Architecture
- II - Abbeyleix House, County Laois
- III - Beaulieu, County Louth
- IV - Bessborough, County Kilkenny
- V - Caledon, County Tyrone
- VI - Cashel Palace, County Tipperary
- VII - Castle Ward, County Down
- VIII - Curraghmore, County Waterford
- IX - Desart Court, County Kilkenny
- X - Dowth Hall, County Meath
- XI - Drumcondra House, County Dublin
- XII - Florence Court, County Fermanagh
- XIII - Furness - see Furness Church, County Kildare
- XIV - Platten Hall, County Meath
- XV - Turvey, County Dublin
- XVI - Belgard, County Dublin, Castle Upton, County Antrim, Heywood, County Laois
