= Durhamstown =

- Townland
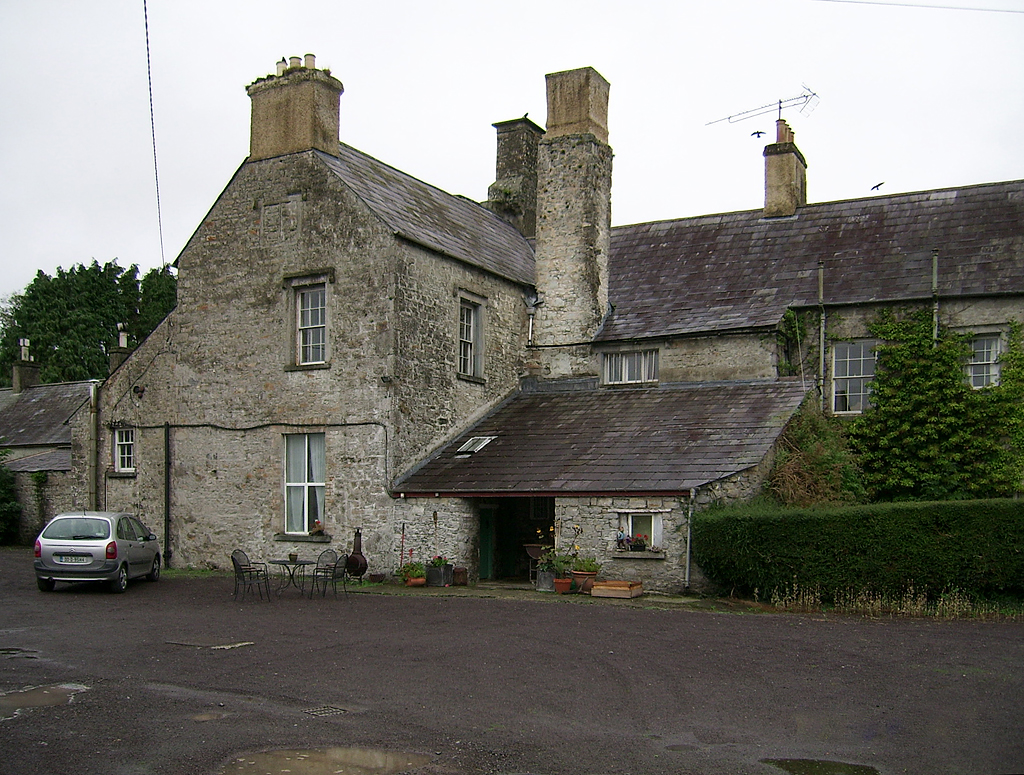
- Buildings on the Durhamstown Castle estate

- Location in Ireland
- Coordinates: 53°39′N 6°47′W
- Country: Ireland
- Province: Leinster
- County: County Meath
- Civil parish: Ardbraccan

Area
  - Total: 4.15 km^{2} (1.60 sq mi)

Population (2011)
  - Total: 319
  - Density: 76.9/km^{2} (199/sq mi)
- Time zone: UTC+0 (WET)
  - Summer (DST): UTC-1 (IST (WEST))
- Irish Grid Reference: N808684

Durhamstown (Irish: Baile an Dormhamaigh), known less frequently as Dormstown, is a townland outside Navan in County Meath, Ireland. In religious terms it is covered by the Roman Catholic parish of Bohermeen. Durhamstown townland lies in the civil parish of Ardbraccan, and has an area of 1,025 acres (1.602 sq mi).

== History ==
=== Name and population ===
Durhamstown, sometimes referred to as Dormstown (a form of spelling which fell into disuse by the mid 20th century), is one of twenty townlands in the civil parish of Ardbraccan and had 64 houses according to the 1911 census of Ireland. As of the 2011 census, the population of the townland was 319 people.

=== Origins of croquet ===
According to histories of the game of Croquet, an early set of rules of the game were compiled by an anonymous writer who described himself as "corncrake" to The Field publication on 21 August 1858. "Corncrake" was revealed to be George Annesley Pollock of the Oatlands estate in Durhamstown. His "The Rules of the Oatlands Club" became a key set of rules for the game, with records revealing that the rules were used by the owners of Oatlands and Durhamstown Castle, and another nearby estate, for local competitions. The game Croquet later spread to Great Britain from Ireland. Though the game spread from Ireland, the first registered set of rules was registered in Britain in 1856.

== Geography ==
The townland's most prominent geographical formations include Faughan Hill, a small hill on the otherwise flat plains of the area on which legend claims Niall of the Nine Hostages was buried. Nearby is Durhamstown Castle, a Norman towerhouse that has been lived in for five hundred years.
