= Allenstown House =

Former Georgian house in County Meath, Ireland

Coordinates: 53.678°N 6.819°W

- Alternative names: Allanstown House

General information
- Architectural style: Georgian
- Location: County Meath, Ireland
- Year built: c. 1750
- Demolished: 1938
- Owner: Irish Land Commission (until destruction)

Technical details
- Floor count: 4

Design and construction
- Developer: William Waller

Allenstown House was a large five-bay, three-story over basement Georgian house in Allenstown near Bohermeen, County Meath, Ireland.

== History ==
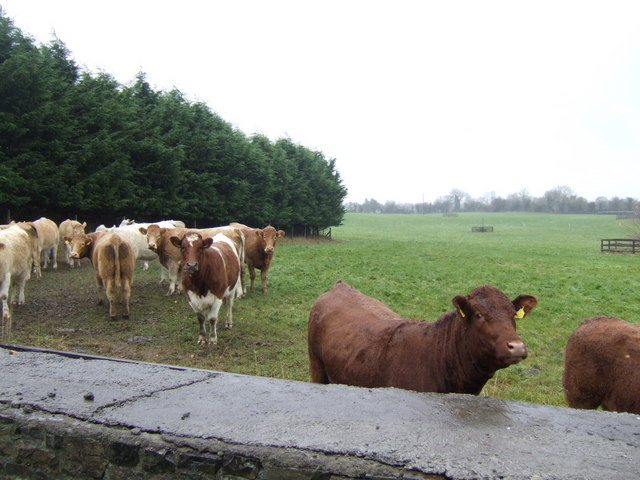
Cattle grazing on the former Allenstown demesne in 2007.

The house was built in around 1730-50 by William Waller (1710 – 1796) in a similar style to other Georgian houses of the era such as Doneraile Court with bowed ends and faced in stone rather than brick. Waller had earlier inherited the lands on the death of his father Robert Waller in 1731. The area had been referred to by variations of the name 'Allenstown' since at least 1541.

In 1733 William Waller married Anna Maria, daughter of James Smyth, Archdeacon of Meath. Waller was High Sheriff of Meath in 1750 as his father was in 1720.

His eldest son Robert later inherited the house and married Mary Shirley but left no surviving children.

The Waller male line hence came to an end in 1809. The house was inherited by William Waller’s nephew the Reverend Mungo Henry Noble, Rector of Clongill, who assumed the surname Waller in 1809.

It was later inherited by his son James Noble-Waller (1800 – 1874) who married Julia Tisdall in 1838 and was High Sheriff of Meath in 1845. Their son William Newcombe Waller (1839-1909) later inherited the property and lived there until his death.

Samuel Lewis in his Topographical Dictionary of Ireland of 1837 writes "Allanstown (sic), the seat of W.H. Waller, Esq., is a handsome mansion situated in a well planted demesne of about 700 plantation acres, including a deer park. In the demesne is Faughan Hill, the summit of which being planted, forms a conspicuous object as seen from the south-east through a vista in the wood".

William Newcombe Waller is recorded there in the 1901 census with three servants.

Another of James' sons Edmund Noble Waller later inherited the property and is recorded there at the time of the 1911 census with his wife Maria Louisa Noble and three servants.

The final owner was Vice-Admiral Arthur William Craig who assumed the surname Craig-Waller when he inherited the property in 1920 from his distant relative.

In the late 1930s the house and estate were bought by the Irish Land Commission. The lands were broken up and sold. The house, though of architectural and historical significance, was controversially demolished in 1938.

=== 2026 Faughan Hill house demolition ===
In 2026, a 577 sq m (6,220 sq ft) Celtic Tiger era house built on a 9 acre site on Faughan Hill in 2006 on part of the original Allenstown House estate was demolished after various planned iterations had earlier been refused permission by Meath County Council and on appeal by An Coimisiún Pleanála. The demolition followed multiple legal challenges taken by the owners, Michael and Rose Murray, over nearly two decades including to the High Court and the Supreme Court.

The house was constructed approximately 500 metres from the site of a Neolithic enclosure, hill fort and ring ditch at Faughan Hill reputed to be the burial place of Niall of the Nine Hostages.

== See also ==
- Ardbraccan
- Ardbraccan House
- Durhamstown Castle
