= Richard Orpen =

Irish architect and painter (1863–1938)

- Born: Richard Francis Caulfield Orpen; 24 December 1863; Oriel, Blackrock, County Dublin, Ireland
- Died: 27 March 1938 (aged 74)
- Relatives: William Orpen (brother)

Richard Orpen (24 December 1863 – 27 March 1938) was an Irish architect, painter, illustrator and designer.

== Life and family ==
Richard Francis Caulfield Orpen was born on 24 December 1863. His parents were Anne (née Caulfield) and Arthur Herbert Orpen, a solicitor of Oriel, Blackrock, County Dublin. His maternal grandfather was bishop of Nassau, Charles Caulfield. He was the eldest of four brothers and two sisters. His youngest brother was William, the painter. Orpen attended St Columba's college, Rathfarnham, County Dublin, and graduated from Trinity College Dublin with a BA in 1885. While attending St Columba's, Orpen published an Irish comic alphabet for the present times in 1881, which was a mix of cartoons and verse mocking Charles Stewart Parnell and the home rule movement.

He married Violet Caulfield in 1900. They were both descended from William Caulfeild, 1st Viscount Charlemont. Orpen died on 27 March 1938 at his home, Coologe, and is buried in Deans Grange Cemetery.

== Career ==
He wanted to pursue painting, but "for family reasons" he became an architect. He spent 11 years with Thomas Drew, initially as a pupil, and later as a managing assistant from 1885 to 1892. From around 1884, Orpen attended the annual excursions of the English Architectural Association. Around 1890, he established his own architectural practice in Drew's offices at 22 Clare Street, Dublin. In 1896, he moved his office to 7 Leinster Street. In 1888 he was elected as a member of the Royal Institute of the Architects of Ireland, serving as a council member from 1902 to 1910, as honorary secretary from 1903 to 1905, and as president from 1914 to 1917. Orpen designed the institute's official seal in 1909. In 1904, the Irish Builder described him as the "originator of the bungalow in Ireland".

He was a joint founder of The Georgian Society along with Walter G. Strickland and John Pentland Mahaffy in 1908.

From 1888, Orpen exhibited with the Royal Hibernian Academy, with watercolours and architectural drawings. He would continue to exhibit with them until 1936. He collaborated with Percy French on a number of projects, including illustrating Racquetry rhymes (1888) and The first lord liftinant and other tales (1890). He provided cartoons for French's periodical, The Jarvey. Orpen's architectural illustrations were included in H. Goldsmith Whitton's Handbook of the Irish parliament houses... (1891). He was one of the original members of the Architectural Association of Ireland, serving as its first president in 1896, and as vice-president in 1910.

Orpen was appointed the architect to St Columba's from 1897 to 1938, following a fire at the college in 1896. He became a fellow of the college, and the sanatorium became known as the Orpen building. He was an active member of the Arts and Crafts Society of Ireland, serving as secretary in 1895, on the committee in 1904, and in 1917 sat on the organising committee for the fifth exhibition. In 1906, he was a founding member of the Arts Club. In 1906 he moved his architectural practice to 13 South Frederick Street, and moved into a house he designed, Coologe, Carrickmines, County Dublin. At the 1907 Irish International Exhibition, Dublin, he exhibited a number of chalk drawings. The same year he designed the cover of a satirical pamphlet, The Abbey row, not edited by W. B. Yeats, which mocked The Arrow and the riots at the first production of The playboy of the western world. Orpen unveiled a bust of Hugh Lane at the opening of the Municipal Gallery of Modern Art on Harcourt Street in 1908. He was appointed secretary to the municipal gallery committee by Lane. In 1910, he was appointed architect to Christ Church Cathedral, as well as architect to St Canice's Cathedral, Kilkenny, and St Patrick's Cathedral, Dublin. In 1911 he was elected an associate of the Royal Hibernian Academy, a full member in 1912, and was the academy's secretary from 1925 to 1937.

From 1910 to 1914, Orpen was in an architectural partnership with Page Dickinson, with the two collaborating on plans for the new Dublin municipal gallery and conversion of the Turkish Baths, Lincoln Place. Lane rejected Orpen and Dickinson's gallery plans, leading to Orpen refusing to work with Lane's choice of architect, Sir Edwin Lutyens. In 1914, Orpen was appointed a guardian of the National Gallery of Ireland, and lectured at the Dublin Metropolitan School of Art on architectural history in 1914 and 1915. He was involved in the design of a number of memorials including the setting for a bronze relief by Beatrice Campbell for the members of the Royal Irish Regiment killed in the South African war and the war memorial at the Rathgar methodist church. He served as president of the arts and crafts section of the Royal Dublin Society. He was also a governor of the Royal National Hospital for Consumption for Ireland in Newcastle, County Wicklow.

Orpen features as one of the many portraits in Seán Keating's Homage to Sir Hugh Lane. St Columba's College holds a portrait of Orpen by his brother, William, as well as a memorial stained glass window to him by Catherine O'Brien.
