= R168 road (Ireland) =

Road in Ireland

R168 road
- Bóthar R168
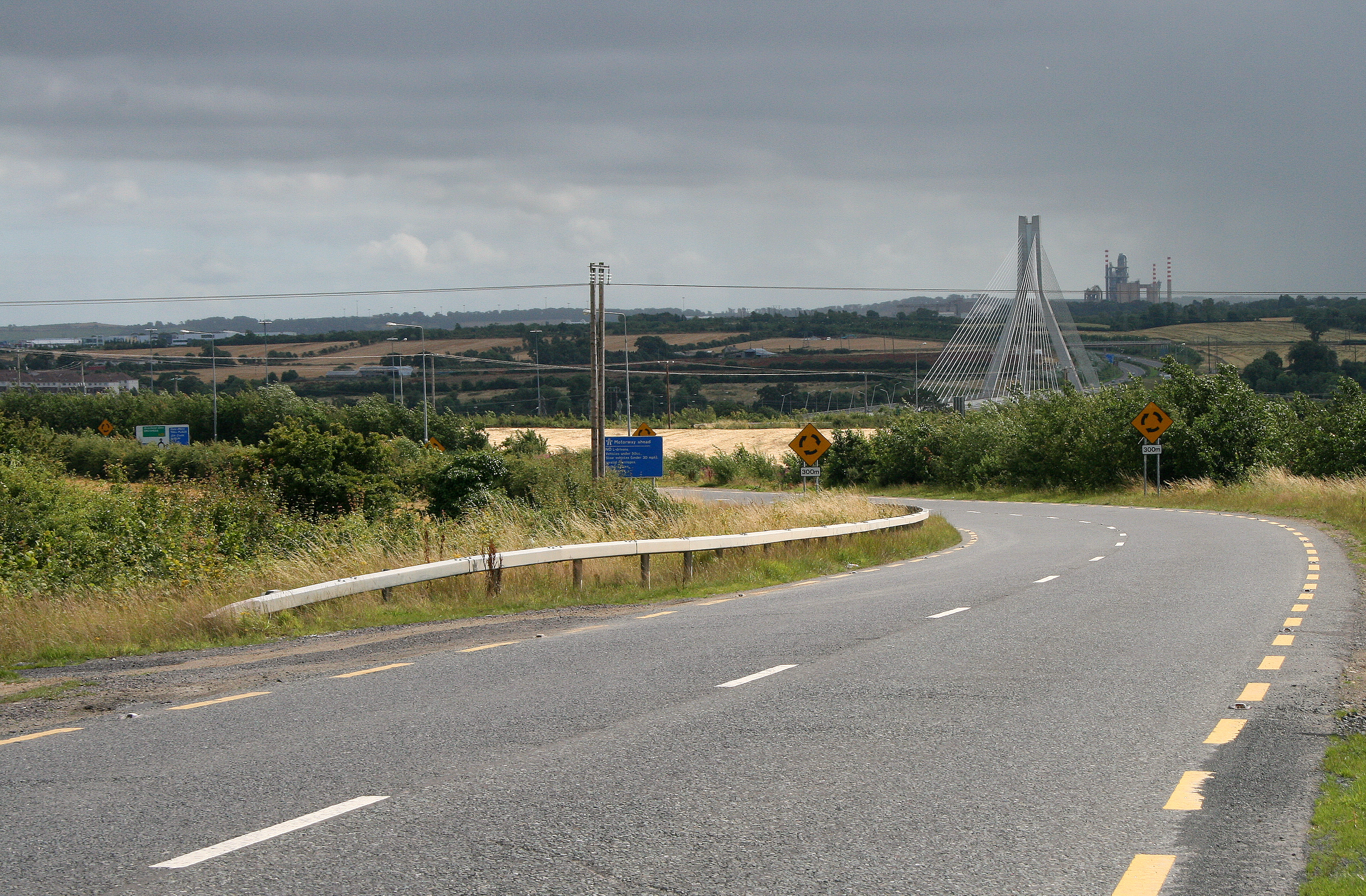
- R168 approaching the M1

Route information
- Length: 13 km (8.1 mi)

Location
- Country: Ireland
- Primary destinations: County Louth; Drogheda - Starts at junction with the R132; Joins the N51; crosses the M1.; Leaves the N51; Terminates at the N2 in Collon

Highway system
- Roads in Ireland; Motorways; Primary; Secondary; Regional

The R168 road is a regional road in Ireland, linking Drogheda to the N2 at Collon, County Louth.

The route is 13 km (8.1 mi) long.

== Route ==
Southeast to northwest, the route starts at a junction with the R132 in Drogheda. It continues northwest joining the N51, crossing the M1 motorway and leaving the N51 at junction X to continue northwest to Collon.

== See also ==
- Roads in Ireland
- National primary road
- National secondary road
