= N51 road (Ireland) =

Road in Ireland

N51 road
- Bóthar N51
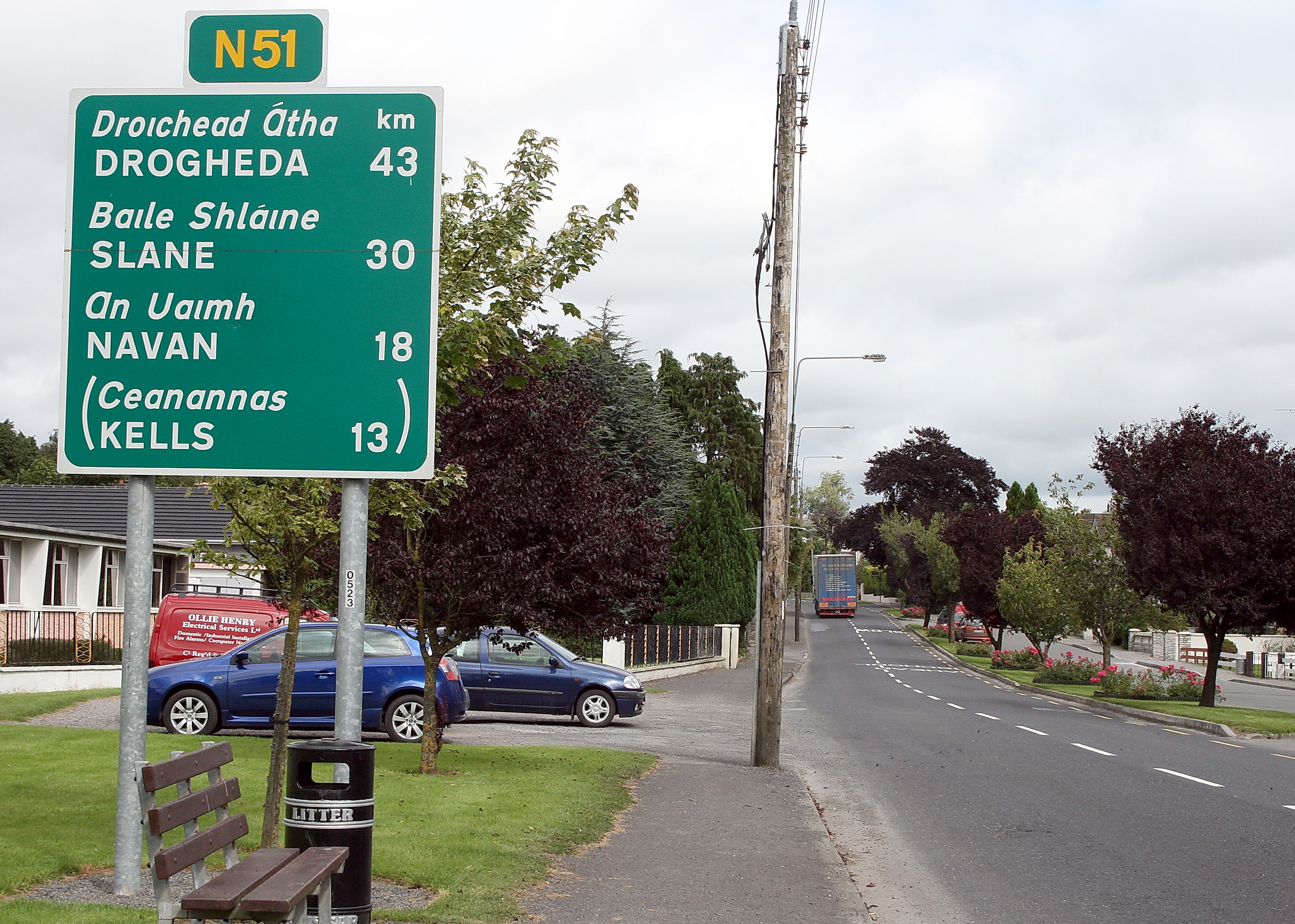
- N51 leaving Athboy

Route information
- Length: 52.994 km (32.929 mi)

Location
- Country: Ireland
- Primary destinations: (bypassed routes in italics): County Westmeath; Delvin, leaves N52; Crosses the Stoneyford River; County Meath; Athboy - R154 Crosses the Athboy River; Boyerstown - Junction with the M3 motorway; Navan - R161 N3 R153 R162; Navan - Crosses the River Blackwater; R163; Slane - N2; County Louth; Joined by the R168 regional road; crosses the M1; R168 leaves; Drogheda Terminates at a roundabout on the R132

Highway system
- Roads in Ireland; Motorways; Primary; Secondary; Regional

The N51 road is a national secondary road in Ireland. West to east, it starts in Delvin, County Westmeath at a junction with the N52. It passes through Athboy, a junction with M3 motorway, Navan and Slane, where it crosses the N2 road, all in County Meath, before crossing the M1 motorway and terminating near Drogheda in County Louth at a roundabout on the R132.

It is an unusual arrangement for a national secondary road to terminate at a regional road. However the R132 is the former N1 route (now by-passed by the M1 motorway) and is of a higher standard than most regional roads.

== Upgrade ==
On 15 May 2009 Phase 2B of the N51 Navan Inner Relief Road was opened to traffic. This route provides a direct link between the N3/M3 Kells Road and the N51 Athboy Road. On the same day a further 3.9 kilometres of the realigned N51 which has been constructed as part of the M3 motorway scheme was opened to traffic, 2.5 kilometres of which is Type 1 dual carriageway.

== See also ==
- Roads in Ireland
- Motorways in Ireland
- National primary road
- Regional road
