= Bellinter House =

Georgian Palladian house in County Meath, Ireland

Coordinates: 53.596°N 6.665°W

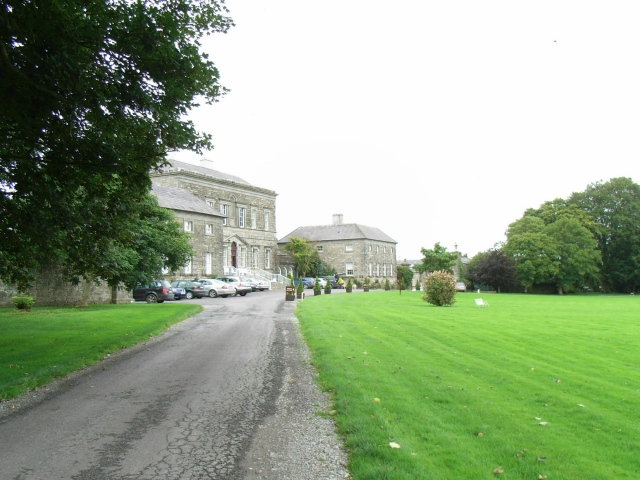
- View of Bellinter House from driveway leading to main house

- Location within Ireland
- Alternative names: Ballinter House

General information
- Type: House
- Architectural style: Palladian
- Location: Ballinter, Navan, County Meath, C15 F2XA, Navan, Ireland
- Elevation: 50 m (160 ft)
- Estimated completion: 1750

Height
- Height: 30 m (98 ft)

Technical details
- Material: Ardbraccan limestone
- Floor count: 3

Design and construction
- Architect: Richard Cassels
- Developer: John Preston

Other information
- Number of rooms: 48 bedrooms

Website
- www.bellinterhouse.com

Bellinter House is a large classical country house of Georgian heritage which, in the early 21st century, was renovated and opened as a hotel and spa. It is in 12 acres of parkland beside the River Boyne in County Meath, Ireland, approximately 10 km (6 miles) from Navan.

Bellinter House takes its name from the townland of Ballinter (Irish: Baile an tSaoir).

== History ==
The lands and property seem to have come into the ownership of John Preston and family in 1743 upon the death of Charles Ford unmarried in London. Bellinter House was designed in 1750 by Richard Castle as a country house for wealthy Dublin brewer John Preston in an estate of around 600 acres of grazing and woodland. John had inherited much lands and wealth from his father John Preston, a former Lord Mayor of Dublin. It was to be Castle's last commission before his death in 1751.

After John Preston's death the estate passed to John's grandson, John Preston, 1st Baron Tara, Member of Parliament for Navan for 17 years, who died in 1821. In 1892 the property was bequeathed by John Joseph Preston to Gustavus Briscoe, a family friend and High Sheriff of Meath in 1897, who once rode a horse up the stairs at Bellinter which then refused to come down and had to be winched down three weeks later. In 1907 the property passed to his son Cecil and then George, who in 1955 sold it to the Holdsworth family. It was the residence of the Holdsworth family from 1957 to 1966, when it came into the control of the Land Commission, who sold off most of the land for farming.

After being left vacant for a time, the house itself, with 12 acres of land, became home to the Sisters of Sion in 1965. In 2004 it was sold and refurbished into a hotel by publicans and hoteliers Jay Bourke and John Reynolds for €2.3m. It opened in late 2006 after a reputed €16m renovation project. In 2016, the house was acquired for €3m by Broadreach Investments, an investment vehicle majority owned by Barry O'Sullivan. In 2024, the house was again sold on to Hotels Properties under the direction of Sheila O'Riordan.

== Buildings ==
The house was built in a Palladian style with six bays built over three floors (including basement) made of coarse rubble with fine limestone dressings. Adjoining the main part of the building and connected by single story arcades are two storey wings, creating a courtyard. In the grounds are stable block, ice house and other outbuildings.

The distinguishing feature of the house is its tripartite doorcase in the manner of John Vanburgh.

== See also ==
- Ardbraccan House
