= Richard Cassels =

German-French architect (1690–1751)

- Born: 1690; Kassel, Germany
- Died: 1751 (aged 60–61); Kildare, Ireland
- Other name: Richard Castle
- Occupation: Architect
- Buildings: Russborough House; The Printing House; Leinster House; Carton House; Summerhill House; Westport House; Rotunda Hospital; Powerscourt Estate; Tyrone House; Ardbraccan House; Bellinter House; Strokestown Park; Hazelwood House; Tudenham Park House

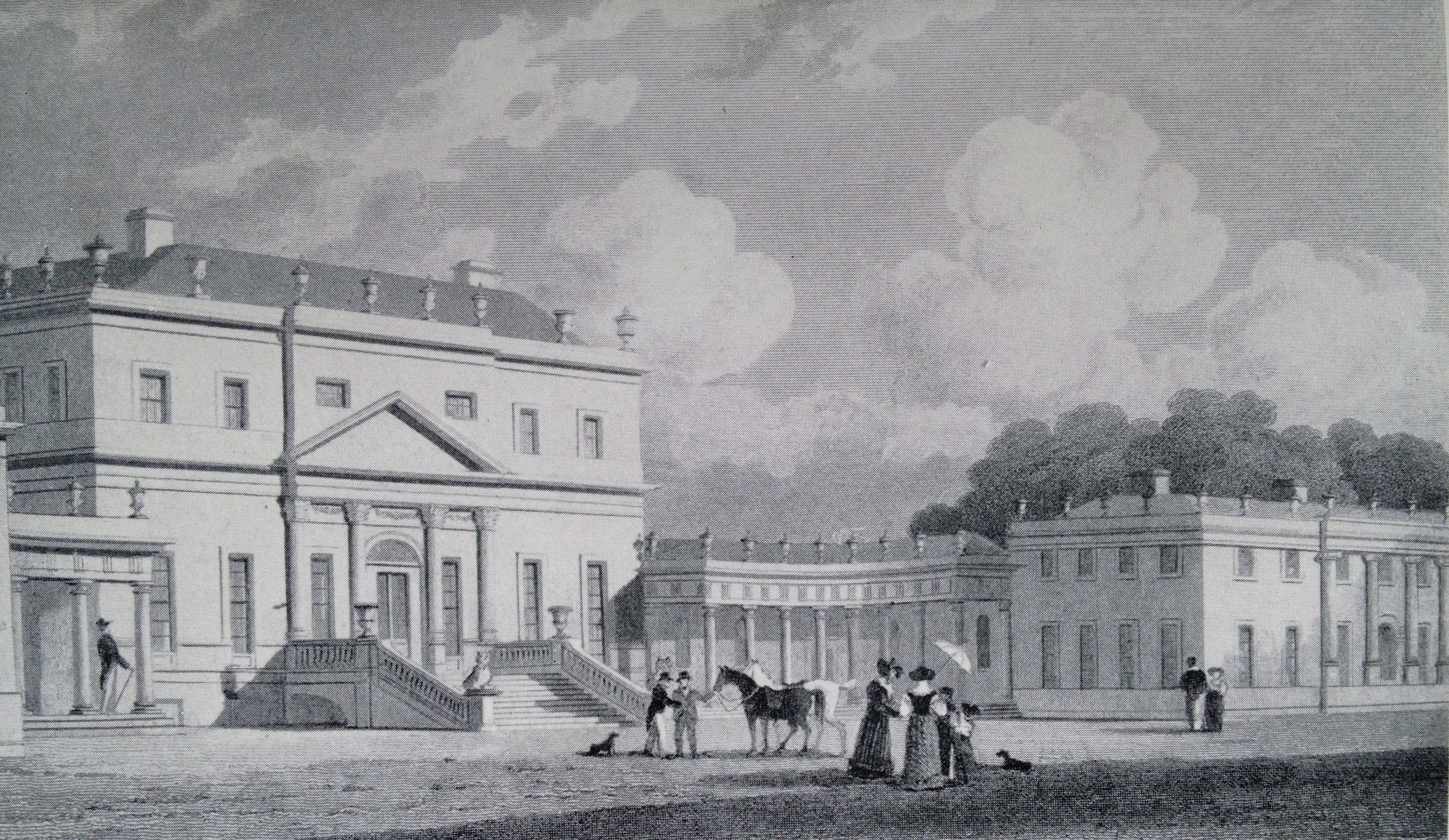
Irish Palladianism. Russborough House, Ireland. One of the many country houses designed in Ireland by Richard Cassels

Richard Cassels (1690 – 1751), also known as Richard Castle, was an architect who ranks with Edward Lovett Pearce as one of the greatest architects working in Ireland in the 18th century. Cassels was born in 1690 in Kassel, Germany. Although German, his family were of French origin and descended from the French-Netherlandish 'Du Ry' family, famous for the many architects among their number. A cousin Simon Louis du Ry designed Schloss Wilhelmshöhe in Kassel.

== Early work ==
Richard Cassels, who originally trained as an engineer, came to Ireland in 1728 at the behest of Sir Gustavus Hume of County Fermanagh to design for Hume a mansion on the shores of Lower Lough Erne. Hume had probably discovered Cassels working in London where he was influenced by the circle of architects influenced by Lord Burlington. Cassels, soon after arrival in Ireland, established a thriving architectural practice in Dublin. Architecturally at the time Dublin was an exciting place to be – Edward Lovett Pearce, also newly established in the city, was working on Castletown House, the great mansion of Speaker William Conolly, and the new Irish Houses of Parliament simultaneously. Both of these buildings were designed in the newly introduced Palladian style. Palladian architecture was currently enjoying a revival that was to sweep across Europe and be adopted with fervour in Ireland. Cassels was well versed in the concepts of Palladio and Vitruvius, but was also sympathetic to the more Baroque style of architecture.

In Dublin itself, Cassels worked on the Houses of Parliament with Pearce, his mentor and friend. Cassels' first solo commission was The Printing House of Trinity College, designed to resemble a temple complete with a doric portico. This portico was an interesting feature symbolising Cassels' early work – a portico is an almost essential feature of Palladian architecture. But as Cassels' work matured he tended to merely hint at a portico by placing semi-engaged columns supporting a pediment as the focal point of a facade. Perhaps he felt the huge Italian porticos that provided shelter from the sun were not requisite for houses in the less clement Ireland. This blind, merely suggested, portico is a feature of his final Dublin masterpiece Kildare House (later renamed Leinster House), built for The 20th Earl of Kildare (later created The 1st Duke of Leinster) between 1745 and 1751. In 1741 he designed the Bishop's Palace which is now part of Waterford Treasures - Three Museums in the Viking Triangle, Waterford, Ireland. A comparison of the Printing House and Leinster House shows the evolution from the true Palladian style to the, commonly referred, Georgian style in Ireland during the quarter-century that Dublin was to be almost rebuilt.

The untimely death of Sir Edward Lovett Pearce, aged 34, in 1733, made Cassels Ireland's leading architect working in the sought-after Palladian style. He immediately assumed all of Pearce's commissions and thus began designing a series of lavish country houses. Following the completion of the Houses of Parliament, there seemed to have been a rush by the aristocracy to build a series of new townhouses in the same style and Cassels was often the first choice for architect. This led to the creation of what came to be known as Georgian Dublin.

For his exteriors, he used a Palladian style that was distinctive for its strength and sobriety. In this, he seems to have been influenced by Pearce and also James Gibbs. However, when it came to interiors, Cassels gave full rein to his love of the more continental Baroque. Walls were covered in stucco reliefs, ceilings medallions and motifs of plaster, segmental mouldings, and carvings, in an almost rococo style peculiar to Ireland.

== Notable works ==
Some of the finest of Cassels works in order of commencement are listed below. (Dates often vary from one source to the other)

=== Summerhill House (1731) ===
Summerhill House was a vast Palladian mansion in County Meath originally designed by Pearce, who died before the project was commenced. Cassels took over the project and was responsible for the rococo interiors. The building was damaged by fire in the 1920s and finally demolished in the 1970s.

=== Westport House, Mayo (1731) ===
Built for Browne in 1730, Westport House is a beautifully sited two-storey over basement ashlar stone house overlooking Clew Bay in County Mayo. Cassels decided to relocate the village of Westport to improve the outlook from the house to the east. The original house was quite small and was later extended by others.

=== Trinity College, The Printing House (1734) ===
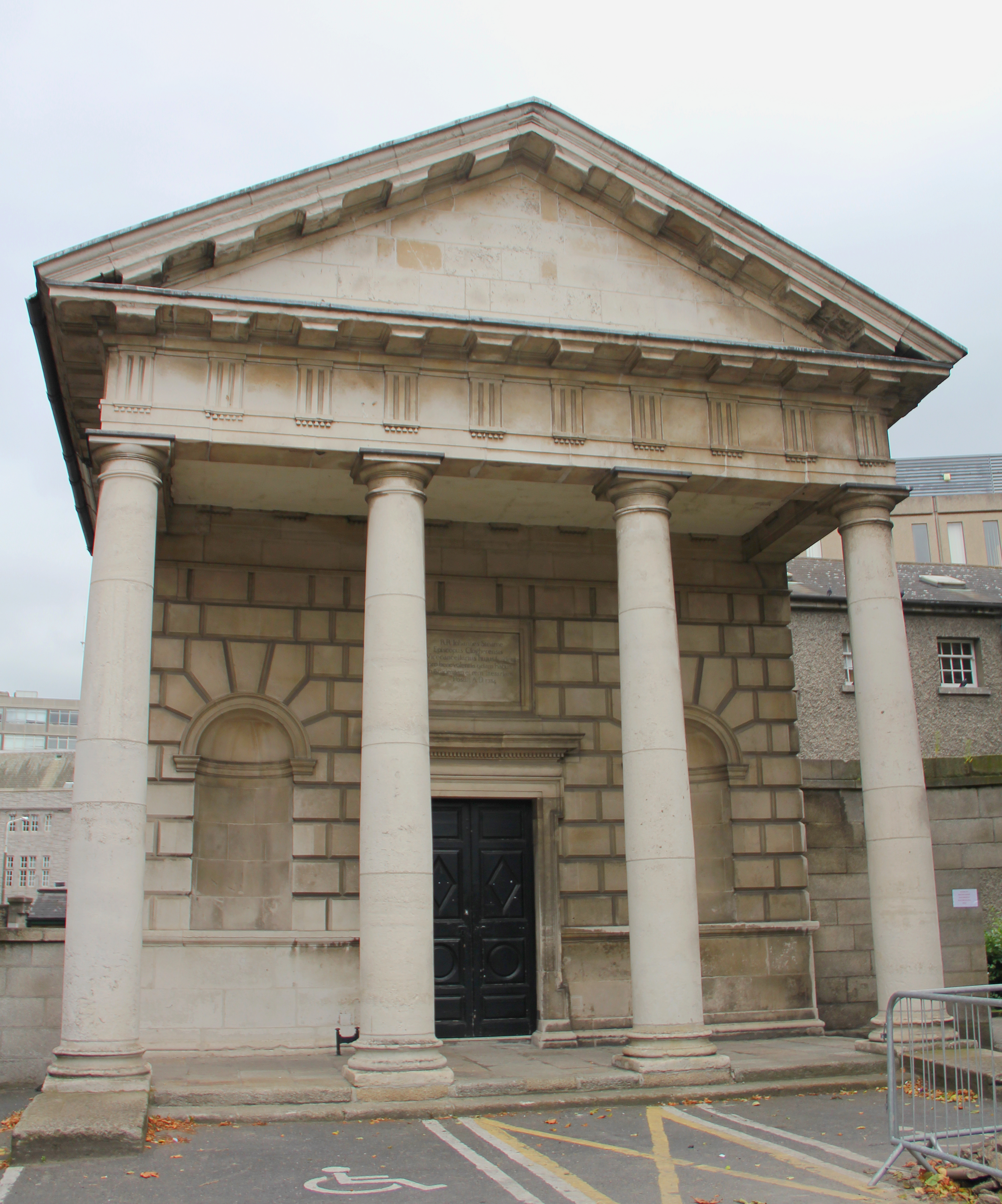
Printing House, Trinity College Dublin

This perfect small doric temple, was completed in 1734 and is thought to be Cassels' first major solo work. A four-columned portico of Doric columns projected from the rusticated severe building and the entirety is only the width of the portico. (This building is sometimes attributed to Edward Lovett Pearce).

=== Carton House (1739) ===
Cassels made large alterations to the Carton house in County Kildare between 1739 and 1745 for the Earl of Kildare. The resultant facades were in his usual restrained and symmetrical style. The great garden facade is terminated by Venetian windows at each end, while in the centre, a single-storey portico is so unostentatious as to be almost a porch. The roofline is hidden by a balustrade, broken by an unsupported pediment over the central bay. The interiors are a riot of plaster-work ornamentation. The Lafranchini brothers, famous for their plaster work, executed some of their finest work here, and would work again with Cassels at Russborough.

=== The Conolly Folly (1740) ===
The Conolly Folly was designed by him, and built in 1740 as a park ornament for Castletown House.

=== Tyrone House, Dublin (1740) ===
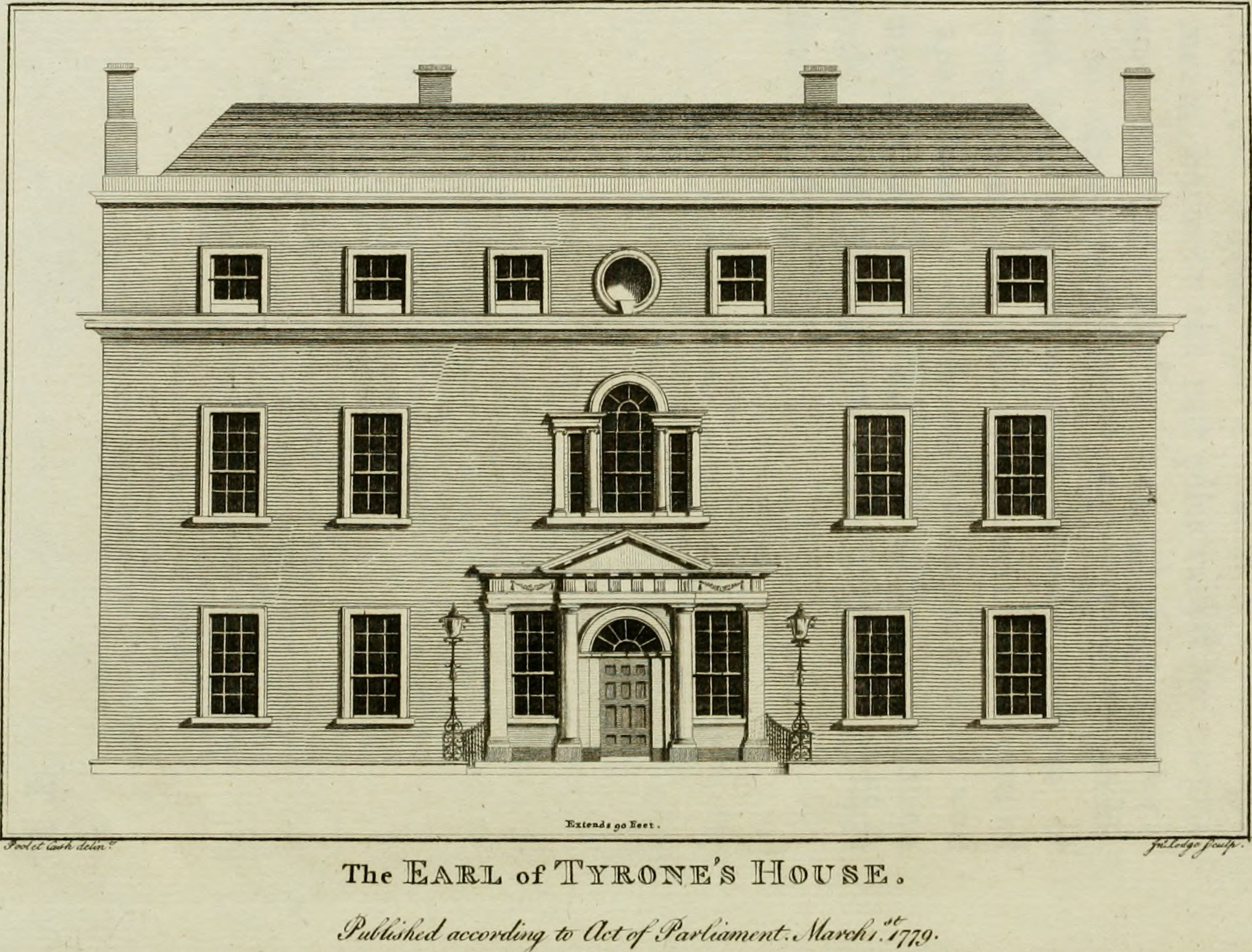
Tyrone House, Dublin designed by Cassels for Marcus Beresford, 1st Earl of Tyrone as his city townhouse.

Cassels designed this Dublin townhouse for Marcus Beresford, Earl of Tyrone, in Marlborough Street between 1740 and 1745. Smaller than Powerscourt House it is said to be the first substantial aristocratic house to be built in the north of the city. It is a fine example of Cassels' robust sober style. The central Venetian window above the principal entrance is the sole example of decoration or flamboyance in this dramatically severe facade.

=== Russborough House (1742) ===
Russborough was designed by Cassels for Joseph Leeson, 1st Earl of Milltown. It was built between 1741 and 1755. A central block containing the principal rooms is flanked by curved and segmented colonnades leading to two symmetrical service blocks. The main entrance, at the centre of one of Cassels's trademark 'suggested' porticoes, is on a raised piano nobile. It is reached by a broad flight of steps. The principal feature of the interiors are the rococo plaster-work and the ceilings, again by the master stuccoists Paul and Philip Lanfrachini; and ornate carved marble fireplaces, all contrasting with the austerity of the exterior.

=== Powerscourt House (1741) ===
Powerscourt House, Wicklow, was a large country house, originally a 13th-century castle, which was completely rebuilt by Cassels, starting in 1730 and finishing in 1741. The demesne was approximately 850 acres (3.4 km^{2}). The three-story house had at least 68 rooms. The entrance hall was 60 feet (18 m) long and 40 feet (12 m) wide where family heirlooms were displayed. The main reception rooms were on the first floor rather than more typically on the ground floor. King George IV was the guest of Richard Wingfield, 5th Viscount Powerscourt in August 1821. Mervyn Wingfield, 7th Viscount Powerscourt inherited the title and the Powerscourt estate, which comprised 49,000 acres (198 km^{2}) of land in Ireland, at the age of 8 in 1844. When he reached the age of 21 he embarked on an extensive renovation of the house and created new gardens. Inspiration for the garden design followed visits by Powerscourt to ornamental gardens at the Palace of Versailles, Schönbrunn Palace, Vienna and Schwetzingen Palace near Heidelberg. The garden development took 20 years to complete in 1880. On a commanding hilltop position, Cassels deviated slightly from his usual sombre style, to give the house something of what John Vanbrugh would have called the 'castle air' – a severe Palladian facade terminated by two circular domed towers. The house was destroyed by fire in 1974 when it was owned by the Slazenger family and renovated in 1996. In the 1830s, the house was the venue for a number of conferences on unfulfilled Bible prophecies, which were attended by men such as John Nelson Darby and Edward Irving. These conferences were held under the auspices of Theodosia Wingfield Powerscourt, then the widow Lady Powerscourt.

=== Leinster House (1745) ===
The house was originally known as Kildare House after James Fitzgerald, the Earl of Kildare, who commissioned Cassels to build it between 1745 and 1747. Intended to be Dublin's grandest mansion, the result could not have disappointed Kildare. It is said that another Irish architect, James Hoban, later copied the facade of Leinster house for his design of the White House in Washington (although Castlecoole designed by James Wyatt bears a closer resemblance). Cassels name appears on the foundation stone of Leinster House, showing the esteem in which he was held.

=== Rotunda Hospital (1757) ===
Originally the main maternity hospital for Dublin, it was redesigned by Cassels who transformed it into a Palladian palace, complete with a rotunda which gives the hospital its name.

=== Waterstown House, Westmeath ===
Built for Gustavus Handcock-Temple in the 1740s, the house which was three stories over the basement and 7 bays wide, was built of brick with stone facing. Cassels work includes a pigeon house (which is almost identical to the Killiney Hill obelisk), walled gardens, a farmyard, and a grotto. The front facade was 7 bays wide and 3 storeys high over a basement. The house was abandoned in 1923. It was sold for scrap in 1928 at which time most of the house was dismantled.

== Legacy to Ireland ==
Richard Cassels died suddenly in 1751 while at Carton House. He gave Ireland a distinctive type of Palladianism, to appreciate which one has to consider the buildings both externally and internally: the restrained, even severe, but nevertheless, grand external façades, which do not jar the eye in the Irish landscape, give no hint of the flamboyant rococo exuberance within.

== See also ==
- Ballyhaise House
- Bellinter House
- Hazelwood House, Sligo
- Market House, Dunlavin
