= Durhamstown Castle =

Tower house in County Meath, Ireland

Coordinates: 53.6540380°N 6.7889340°W

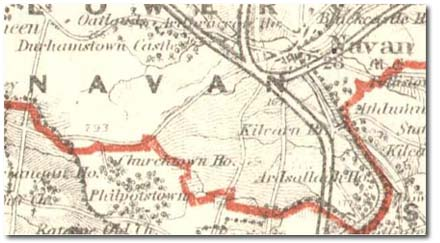
1885 Map showing the location of Durhamstown Castle

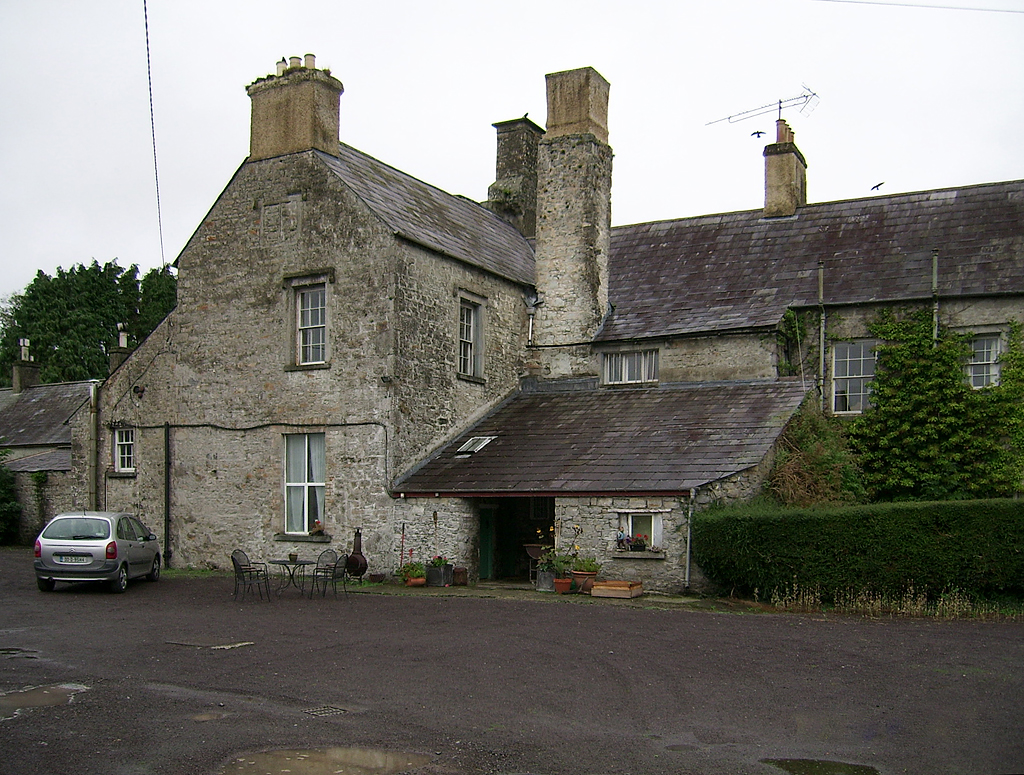
A view of Durhamstown

Durhamstown Castle is a 600-year-old towerhouse in the townland of Durhamstown of the civil parish of Ardbraccan which is in the barony (Ireland) of Lower Navan, in County Meath, Ireland. It has been inhabited continuously since 1420. It is named after a Mr. Dorream (or Mr. Dorram), whose family lived there in 1511, and has been converted into a guest house and restaurant.

Although the precise origins of the building are unknown, the existing castle is believed to date from the early 15th century. The building is of four storeys and the ground floor has four vaulted chambers with inserted windows. A square tower with a pointed door which opens to a spiral staircase can be found at its east wall. There are three tall chimneys clustering at the north end of the nave. There is believed to have originally been another storey which was knocked down as a result of a fire. A 19th-century single-storey wing has been added to the north of the old house.

In the 16th century the building was owned by The 1st Earl of Essex, Lord Deputy of Ireland under Queen Elizabeth I of England and Ireland.

In the 17th century Sir Roger Jones-Lord Ranallagh lived there, whose son Arthur, as Chancellor of the Exchequer, was involved in a scandal whereby the entire Irish Exchequer was diverted to pay for the mistresses of Charles II. During the 18th century its occupants were Thompsons and during the 19th the Roberts family.

It is currently owned by Dave and Sue Prickett, who bought it in 1996 and run it as a guest house and restaurant.

== See also ==
- Allenstown House
- Ardbraccan
- Ardbraccan House
- Bohermeen
