= Dowth Hall =

Georgian country house estate in County Meath, Ireland

- Dubhadh
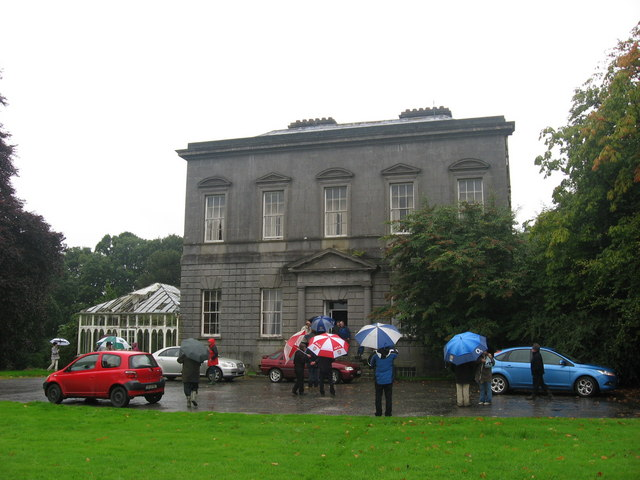
- A view of the front of Dowth Hall in September 2010

- Location within Ireland

General information
- Status: Private dwelling house
- Type: House
- Architectural style: Georgian
- Location: Dowth, County Meath, Ireland
- Coordinates: 53.705428°N 6.439984°W
- Estimated completion: 1760
- Owner: Owen Brennan and Alice Stanton (Devenish Nutrition)

Technical details
- Material: limestone
- Floor count: 2 storey over basement
- Grounds: 420 acres

Design and construction
- Architect: George Darley
- Developer: John Netterville, 6th Viscount Netterville (1744–1826)

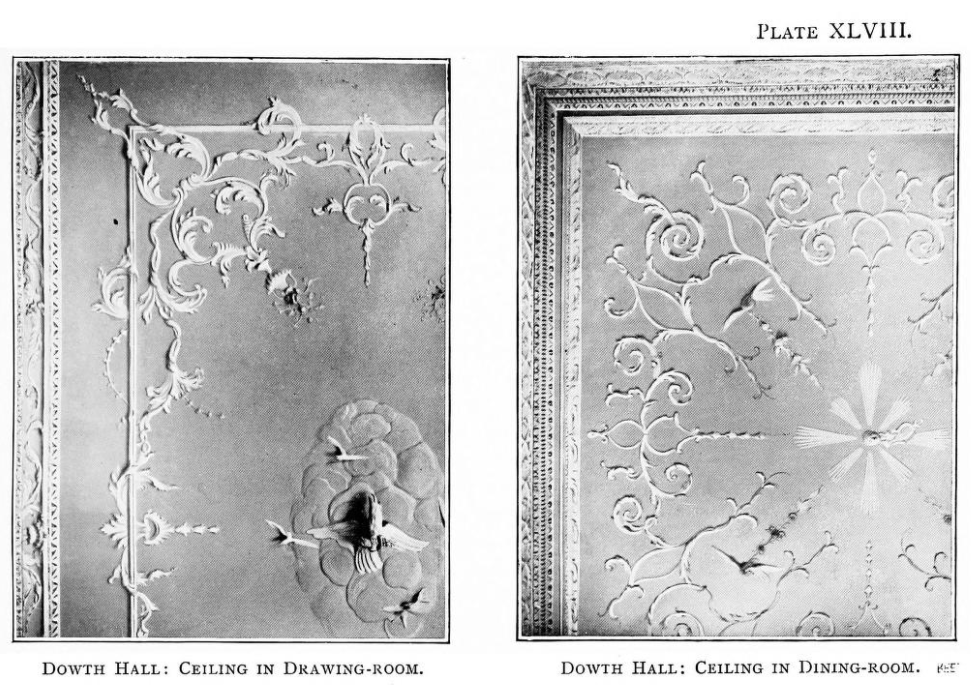
Dowth Hall, drawing room ceiling stucco detail

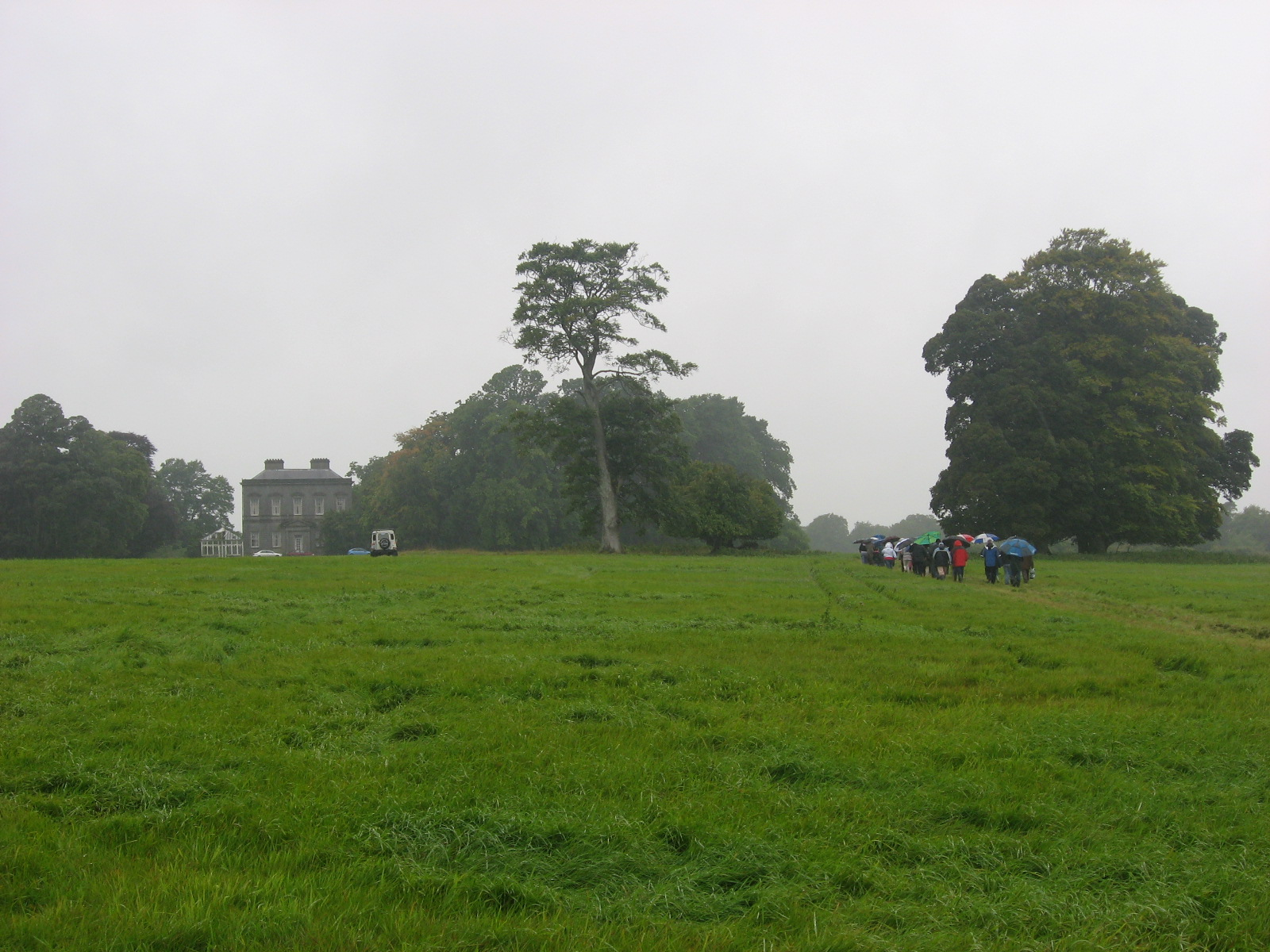
A view of the mature pasture and woodland in the Dowth Hall estate with the house in the distance in 2010.

Dowth Hall is a Georgian country house and estate near Dowth in County Meath, Ireland. Built in 1760 for the Netterville family, the 420 acre estate occupies a large part of the archaeological site which makes up the Brú na Bóinne UNESCO World Heritage Site landscape encompassing Dowth passage tomb.

In July 2018 it was announced that a megalithic passage tomb had been rediscovered directly underneath the house during renovations of the house and gardens.

In 2023 the house was purchased by the Irish Government for €11m.

== History ==
The property is named after the townland of Dowth (Irish: Dubhadh - darkness) where the house and estate are located.

The Netterville family had lived in the area of Dowth for hundreds of years before the construction of the current house with the Dowth estate supposedly originally being granted to them by Hugh de Lacy, Lord of Meath. As far back as 1207, their direct ancestor Luke Netterville is recorded as taking the position of Archdeacon of Armagh.

In 1845 the house was purchased by a wealthy English Catholic named Richard Gradwell whose family including his only son Robert Gradwell and then his cousins continued to reside at the house until the 1950s.

Later it was purchased by two Meath bachelors who lived at the property without making many adjustments to the interior or exterior of the property. The last of the family, Patrick Pidgeon, finally died only in 2011 whereupon the property was put up for sale by the executor.

The house and 420 acre estate were purchased for €5m by Owen Brennan and Alice Stanton of Devenish Nutrition in October 2013. Businessman Charles Noell was an underbidder on the purchase of the house and went on to buy Ardbraccan House instead around the same time.

=== Archaeological discovery ===
In July 2018, it was revealed that during restoration and renovations of the house and terraced gardens, archaeologists discovered that it had been constructed directly over a 5,500 year-old megalithic passage tomb. Following an archaeological sampling and dig as part of a larger piece of work to monitor ongoing works on the property, two small passage tombs near the back of the house were unearthed while to the front of the house the largest henge ever discovered in Ireland was unearthed.

At the time of discovery of the first greywacke kerbstones in 2018, archaeologists including Clíodhna Ní Lionáin said it to be the most important megalithic find in Ireland in the past 50 years.

While the excavations and archaeological report were a planning condition for the refurbishment of the house, the owners additionally funded other private digs throughout the lands in the years leading up to the excavation of the passage tomb. The German government have also funded various other digs throughout the area as part of the 'Boyne to Brodgar' project, which studied links between Neolithic sites in the Boyne Valley and the Orkney Islands.

== House ==
The house itself is a 5-bay 2-storey (plus additional mezzanine to rear) over basement property with a rusticated ground floor. The limestone ashlar fronted second floor features windows which are topped by alternating pediments while the house is topped with an ashlar limestone parapet and a hipped slate roof.

It is not conclusively known who designed Dowth Hall, although many sources attribute it to the builder and architect George Darley (1730-1817), owing to his connection to Lord Netterville who had employed him for this purpose on other buildings owned by Netterville in Dublin.

The house, conservatory (built circa 1900), gate lodge and stables are listed on the Meath record of protected structures under the RPS ID 90706.

=== Interior ===
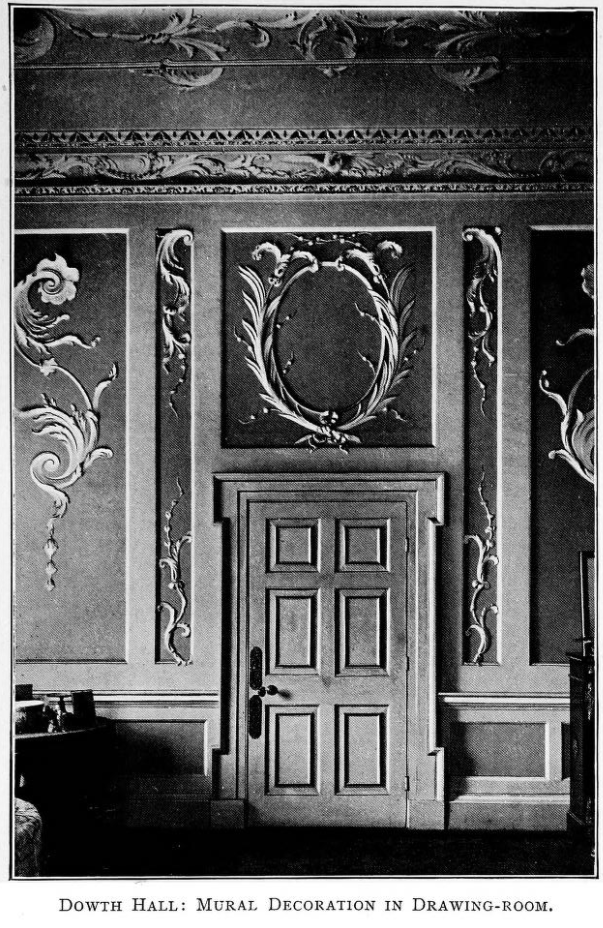
Dowth Hall, drawing room wall and door detail

While the exterior of Dowth Hall is relatively modest in both scale and decoration, it is for the detailed and varied interior rococo stucco work that the building is most notable. The work is now usually attributed to the stuccodore and architect Robert West who is said to have worked on other buildings for George Darley such as 86 St Stephen's Green as well as on other superlative examples of stuccoed architecture such as Belvedere House, Dublin.

The original main dining room of the house has some of the finest and most elaborate stucco work in Ireland with paneling containing scrolls, garlands, festoons and tendrils while the main ceiling light is suspended from the claws of a bird of prey surrounded by other more delicate birds. The rest of the ground floor features more ornate plasterwork although none is quite as elaborate as in the dining room. The main bedrooms on the first floor of the property also contain a limited amount of plasterwork where would usually be seen a painted or paper covered wall surface.

== Other functions ==
The house and estate have at times been used for various other functions including as a venue for festivals, as a racecourse for horses, as a wedding venue, as a filming location during the making of The Last September and as a tourist attraction.

=== Netterville Manor ===
Within the estate, the Nettervilles also constructed a red-brick Victorian Almshouse-style building adjacent to the old Dowth castle tower house. Today this is often referred to as the Netterville Institute or Netterville Manor and is owned as a separate piece of property and run as a bed and breakfast.

== See also ==
- Beaulieu House and Gardens
- Townley Hall
