= The Printing House =

Doric temple in Dublin, Ireland

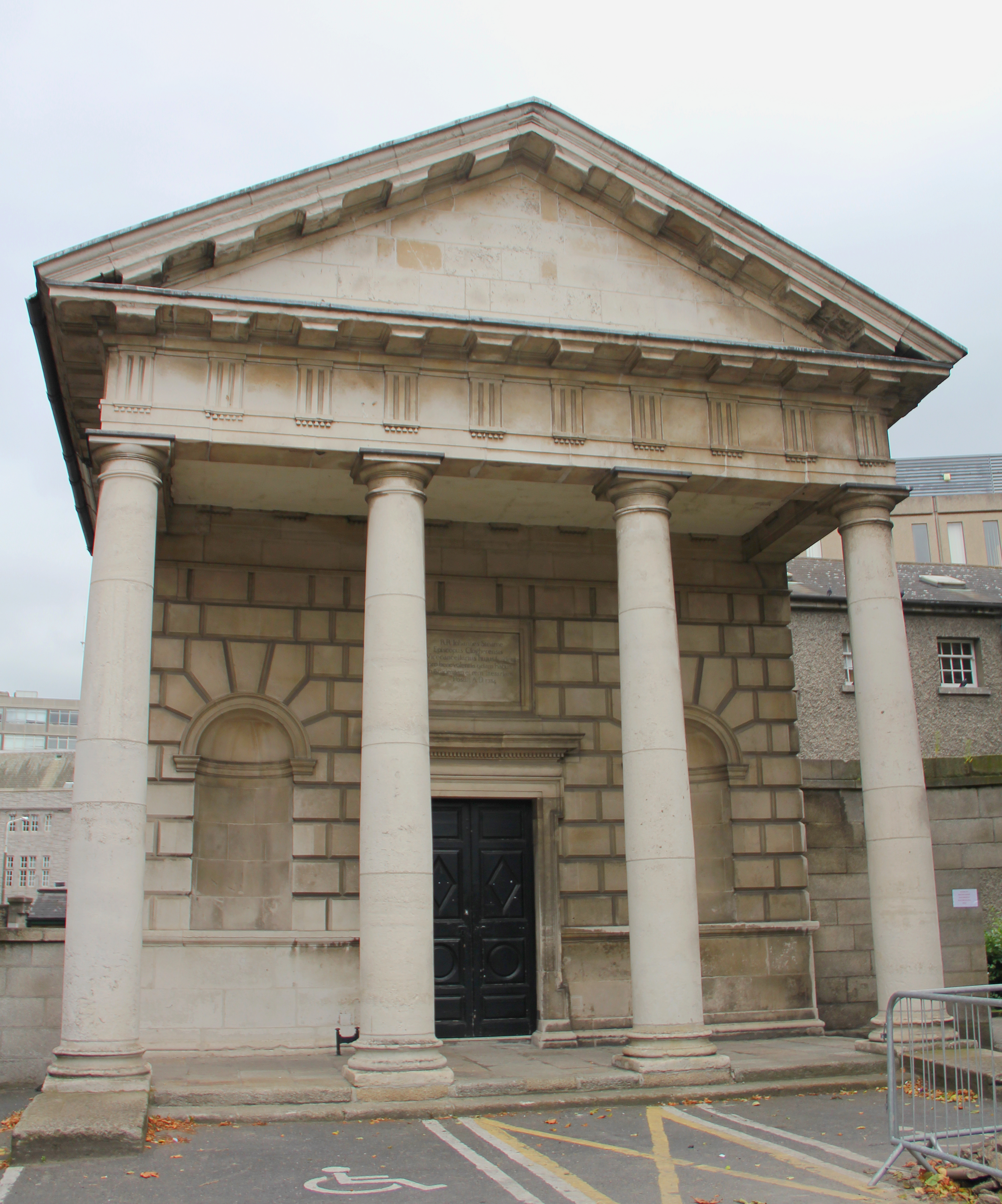
- Interactive map of the The Printing House area

General information
- Type: Temple
- Architectural style: Palladian; Classical
- Location: Dublin, Ireland
- Coordinates: 53.3448227°N 6.2559456°W
- Estimated completion: 1734

Technical details
- Material: Portland stone (facade and columns); Calp limestone (side and rear walls); Granite (chimneys and column bases)
- Floor count: 3 (2 over raised basement)

Design and construction
- Architects: Richard Castle; Edward Lovett Pearce
- Other designers: Moses Darley (stonecutter); Thomas Gilbert (stone supplier)
- Main contractor: John Plummer

The Printing House is a classical Palladian style temple building that was constructed within the campus of Trinity College Dublin around 1734 under the tenure of provost Richard Baldwin.

The building housed the Dublin University Press from its opening until 1976.

== History ==
The building was likely executed by Richard Castle as his first solo commission although it may have originally been designed by Castle or Edward Lovett Pearce prior to his death in 1733.

The builder is recorded as John Plummer, while other craftsmen included Moses Darley as stonecutter and Thomas Gilbert who was involved in procuring stone. Darley, Gilbert and Castle had all previously worked for Lovett Pearce on the nearby Parliament House, the first Palladian building of scale in Dublin.

The building is faced in rusticated imported Portland stone with a double-height pediment with prostyle tetrastyle portico to front. More modest local calp limestone is used for the sides of the building with the chimneys and bases of the columns in more sturdy lighter coloured Irish granite.

The building would have originally closed a pleached lime tree-lined avenue leading from the Thomas Burgh designed Anatomy House which was constructed circa 20 years prior but has since been demolished. It would have originally been to the rear of The Rubrics and Rotten Row.

John Sterne, Bishop of Clogher donated £1,000 towards the construction of the building and a plaque with a Latin dedication is still inscribed over the front door.

The building would have been notable for being one of the earliest Palladian style buildings in Dublin using a combination of Portland stone in the English Georgian tradition of the period as well as local materials from the Dublin region.

=== Other college works ===
Castle was also engaged to later design a campanile (belfry) for the campus which was constructed around 1746 but was ultimately demolished around 1790 as it was deemed structurally unsound. He also designed a dining hall around 1745 which was replaced around 1765 and presented designs for an entirely new west front and front square for the college which have since been lost.

=== Book of Kells ===
In 2023, it was announced that the building would host the Book of Kells, during refurbishment works which are to be carried out on the Old Library within the campus.

== See also ==
- St Paul's, Covent Garden
- Hugh Darley
