= Dublin University Press =

Independent, non-profit publisher with roots as a university press

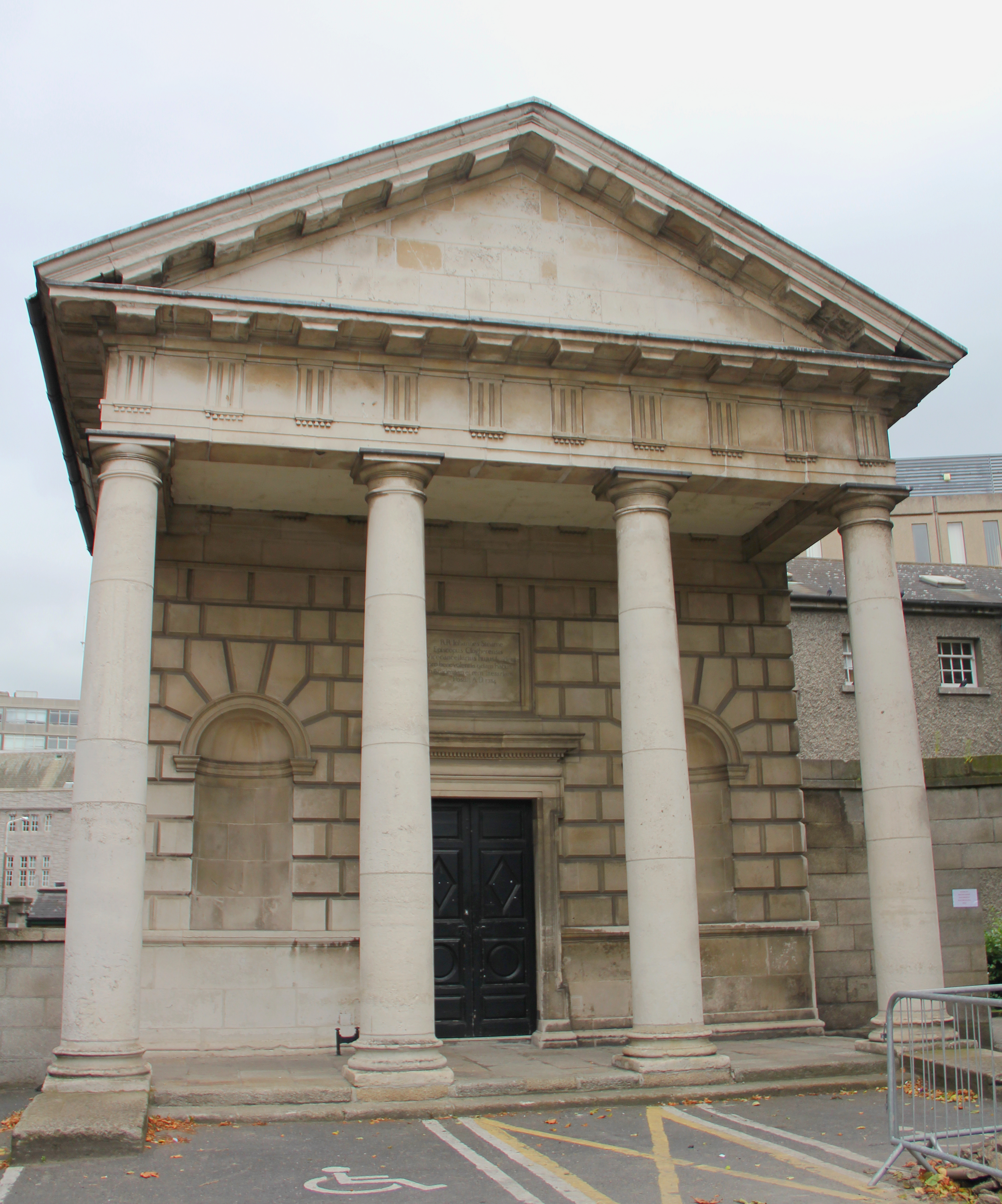
Dublin Trinity College Printing House

Dublin University Press was a former imprint of the University of Dublin operating from 1734–1976. The first edition it produced was a Greek version of Plato's Dialogues in 1738.

Its greatest period of success was from 1842–1875 under the management of Michael Henry Gill. Its last manager was Liala Allman, who worked at the Press for a number of years before taking over from her father in 1958.

The press was housed at the dedicated Printing House building from its opening in 1734 until 1976 and a linocut of the house forms the logo of the press printed on many of its publications.

In 1976, the press was acquired by the Brunswick Press.

The Press was revived in 2021 following the collapse of the Brunswick press and was reacquired by staff of Trinity College Dublin.
