= Charles Noell =

American businessman and racehorse owner (born 1953)

- Born: Charles Edwards Noell III c. 1953 (age 72–73)
- Education: University of North Carolina at Chapel Hill, BA in History; Harvard Business School, MBA

Charles Noell is an American businessman and racehorse owner.

In 1992, he founded JMI Equity. Noell purchased Ardbraccan House in County Meath in 2013 for €4.9m. Ardbraccan House is the base of Merriebelle Stable, a horse racing stable he co-owns with John Jay Moores. He's a keen fox hunter.

In December 2015, he was reported to be interested in co-purchasing Everton F.C.
