= Ultan of Ardbraccan =

Saint Ultan of Ardbraccan

Bishop and Abbot of Ardbraccan Venerable
- Died: c. 657
- Venerated in: Catholic Church
- Canonized: Pre-Congregation
- Feast: 4 September
- Patronage: children, paediatricians

Ultan of Ardbraccan (died c. 657) also known as Ultan the Scribe, was an Irish monk and Abbot-Bishop of Ardbraccan during the 7th century. He is venerated as a saint in the Catholic Church, with his feast day being celebrated on 4 September.

== Life ==
Tradition has said he was an uncle of Brigid of Kildare; however, this is not chronologically possible. He collected a life of her for his pupil, St. Broccán Clóen of Rostuirc, in Ossory. The Irish Annals describe St. Ultan as of the royal race of O'Connor. Ultan was a disciple and kinsman of St. Declan, who made him bishop of Ardbraccan. He succeeded St. Breccan as Abbot-Bishop of Ardbraccan around 570.

Ultan founded a school, educating and feeding its poor students, and was noted for his work in collecting the writings of St. Brigid and illuminating them. One of his students was Tírechán. He was also known for his beautiful hymns. His Latin hymn, commencing "Christus in nostra insula", is incorporated in the Solesmes Chant books.

In the Félire Óengusso, he is mentioned as "the great sinless prince in whom the little ones are flourishing: the children play greatly round Ultan of Ardbraccan." The annotation explains that the Yellow Plague attacked adults more than children and described the piteous scenes of human suffering witnessed during its continuance. Everywhere through the country numbers of little children, whose mothers and fathers had been carried off, were left helpless and starving. Ultan collected all the orphan babes he could find, and brought them to his monastery. In one of the accounts, we are told that he often had as many as 150. He is said to have invented a method of feeding his young charges by "procuring a number of cows' teats, which he filled with milk".

Having preached the Gospel in Ardbraccan, he went to the Aran Islands after a short stay in County Meath. Ultan died on one of the Aran Islands, where his tomb slab was discovered. He died on 4 September sometime in the 650s. The Annals of Clonmacnoise placed St. Ultan's death in 653.

He may also have been a bishop of the Desi of Meath. Much mention of him is made in the Martyrology of Aengus. He is also connected with Killanny and Louth, both of which are in County Louth.

Ultan's Holy Well was originally within the Celtic Monastery, and later within the Anglo-Norman bishop's grounds.

== Legacy ==
=== Patronage ===
He is now regarded as the patron saint of paediatricians; a well known children's hospital and a special school in Navan being named after him.

=== Namesakes ===
The church at Upper Killinkere takes its name from St. Ultan, patron of children, whose abbey was established at Ardbraccan between Kells and Navan in the 6th century. He is reputed to have travelled to Killinkere and founded the first Christian church in the area.

The establishment of Saint Ultan's Children's Hospital was the result of the activity of a group of female doctors and activists, including Madeleine ffrench-Mullen and Kathleen Lynn, who were deeply concerned at the high level of infant mortality in Dublin, and the rise of infant syphilis in the wake of the First World War. The hospital opened at 37 Charlemont Street on Ascension Thursday, 29 May 1919. St. Ultan's closed in 1984 and merged with the National Children's Hospital.

== Sources ==
- Farmer, D.H. (1979). The Oxford dictionary of saints. Oxford: Clarendon Press.
