= John Pentland Mahaffy =

Irish classicist and polymathic scholar (1839–1919)

Sir John Pentland Mahaffy GBE CVO JP
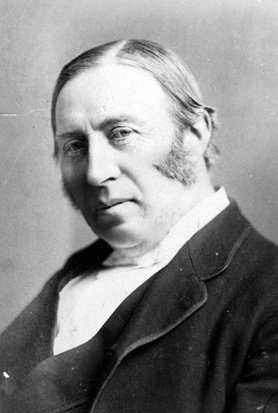

34th Provost of Trinity College Dublin
- In office 17 October 1914 – 30 July 1919
- Preceded by: Anthony Traill
- Succeeded by: John Bernard

Personal details
- Born: John Pentland Mahaffy; 26 February 1839 Vevey, Switzerland
- Died: 30 April 1919 (aged 80) Dublin, Ireland
- Spouse: Frances Letitia MacDougall (m. 1865; died 1908)
- Children: 4
- Education: Trinity College Dublin (B.A., 1859)

Sir John Pentland Mahaffy (26 February 1839 – 30 April 1919) was an Irish classicist and polymathic scholar who served as the 34th Provost of Trinity College Dublin from 1914 to 1919.

== Early life and education ==
He was born near Vevey in Switzerland on 26 February 1839, to Irish parents, Nathaniel Brindley Mahaffy and the former Elizabeth Pentland, receiving his early education privately in Switzerland and Germany, and later and more formally at Trinity College Dublin. As an undergraduate, he became President of the University Philosophical Society. He was elected a scholar in 1857, graduated in classics and philosophy in 1859, and was elected a fellow in 1864.

== Academic career ==
Mahaffy held a chair in Ancient History at Trinity from 1871, and eventually became Provost in 1914, at the age of 75. He was a distinguished classicist and papyrologist as well as a Doctor of Music. He wrote the music for the Grace in chapel. Mahaffy, a man of great versatility, published numerous works across a range of subjects, some of which, especially those dealing with the 'Silver Age' of Greece, became standard authorities.

He was High Sheriff of County Monaghan for 1900 and a Justice of the Peace for county Dublin. He was President of the Royal Irish Academy from 1911 to 1916.

== Famous wit ==
He was regarded as one of Dublin's great curmudgeons and also one of its greatest wits. When aspiring to be Provost of Trinity College, upon hearing that the incumbent was ill, he is said to have remarked, "Nothing trivial, I hope?" In his academic years, perhaps his most notable student was Oscar Wilde, with whom he discussed homosexuality in ancient Greece, and with whom he also collaborated in writing Mahaffy's book Social Life in Greece. Although he later expressed reservations about Mahaffy, Wilde nonetheless described him as "my first and best teacher" and "the scholar who showed me how to love Greek things". When Wilde went on to achieve fame and success, Mahaffy boasted of having created him, only to later describe Wilde as "the only blot on my tutorship". Like his protégés, Wilde and Oliver Gogarty, Mahaffy was a brilliant conversationalist, coming out with such gems as "in Ireland the inevitable never happens and the unexpected constantly occurs." When asked, by an advocate of women's rights, what the difference was between a man and a woman he replied, "I can't conceive." He was apparently opposed to Irish Catholics accessing higher education; Gerald Griffin records Mahaffy as saying "James Joyce is a living argument in defence of my contention that it was a mistake to establish a separate university for the aborigines of this island – for the corner boys who spit into the Liffey."

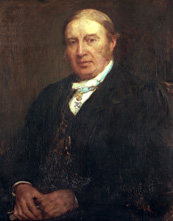
Portrait by Walter Osborne (ca. 1918)

Politically, Mahaffy was a staunch unionist who in 1899 tried to have the Irish language removed from the national Intermediate curriculum on the grounds that there was no literature in the language that was not "religious, immoral or indecent". In 1914, he suppressed the university's Gaelic Society when it proposed to mark the centenary of the birth of Thomas Osborne Davis with a gathering that was to be addressed by Patrick Pearse, who at the time was campaigning against the recruitment of Irish soldiers to serve in the British armed forces during World War I, whereas Mahaffy was vigorously in favour of all possible support for the British war effort. Additionally, Mahaffy was greatly worried by the prospect of the partition of Ireland, and during the Irish Convention of 1917-18, he proposed a federalist Home Rule arrangement in Ireland, based on the Swiss cantons’ model, with parliaments in each of the provinces sending representatives to a central assembly.

Mahaffy also had a reputation as a snob. For instance, he had a great admiration for the nobility and would often prefer the company of dukes and kings. When he moved into Earlscliffe (a house on the Hill of Howth, County Dublin) as his summer residence, a wag at the time suggested that maybe it had better be renamed Dukescliffe.

Curmudgeon and snob, Mahaffy was also capable of great and spontaneous kindness, as is evident from the instance of the schoolboy whom Mahaffy came upon near the Hill of Howth, where the boy was reading Greek. Mahaffy asked him about his studies, later lent him books to assist him, and eventually saw to it that the young man was admitted free of charge to read Classics at Trinity College Dublin.

== Personal life ==
Mahaffy's paternal ancestry could be traced back to the south of County Donegal, where his great-grandfather owned land. His grandfather and father were also Church of Ireland clergymen.

In 1865, Mahaffy married Frances Letitia MacDougall (d. 1908), by whom he had two daughters, Rachel Mary (d. 1944) and Elsie (d. 1926), and two sons, Arthur William (d. 1919) and Robert Pentland (d. 1943). He travelled widely, to destinations such as Egypt, Nubia, Greece and the United States of America. Despite his ordination as a clergyman, he was knighted in 1918, shortly before his death.

His interests were not confined to academia: he shot and played cricket for Ireland, and claimed to know the pedigree of every racehorse in Ulster. He was also an expert fly fisherman. He was also instrumental in setting up The Georgian Society for the appreciation of Irish Georgian architecture; this functioned from 1908 to 1913.

In 1889, with his friend James Edward Rogers Mahaffy published Sketches from a tour through Holland and Germany.

The memory of many of Mahaffy's accomplishments was preserved thanks to the efforts of R. B. McDowell, who together with W. B. Stanford published Mahaffy: A Biography of an Anglo-Irishman (Routledge & Kegan Paul, 1971).

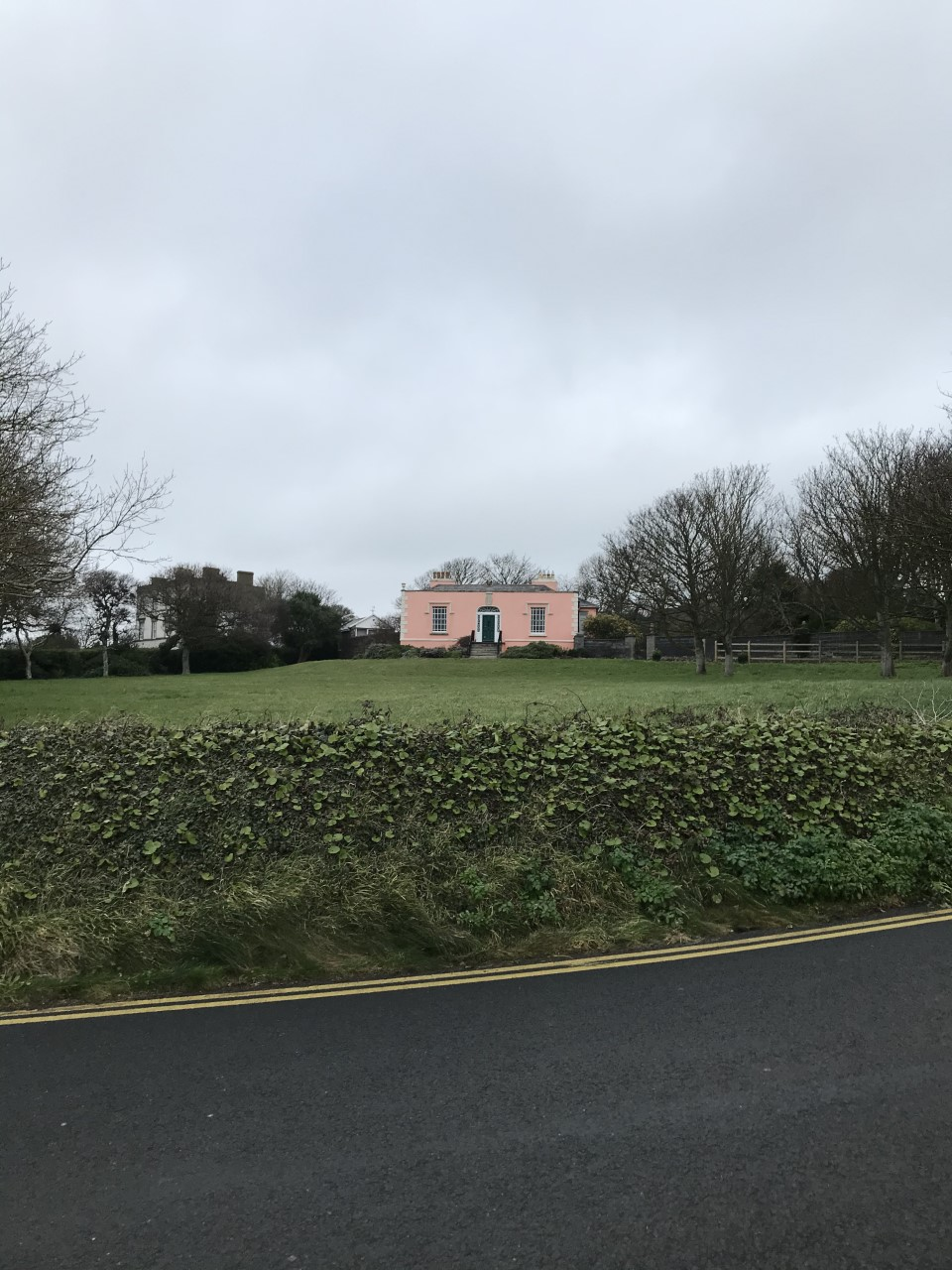
Sealawn House in Sutton, Dublin

Mahaffy had a Dublin townhouse at 38 North Great George's Street and another overlooking Dublin bay at Sealawn in Sutton, Dublin.

== Bibliography ==
Among Mahaffy's most notable works are

- Social Life in Greece from Homer to Menander (1874; 7th edition, 1890);
- Rambles and Studies in Greece (1876);
- History of Classical Greek Literature (1880; 4th edition, 1903);
- Descartes (1880, reprint 1896, online)
- Greek Life and Thought from Alexander to the Roman Conquest (1887; 2nd edition, 1896);
- The Story of Alexander's Empire (1887, online);
- Kant's Critical Philosophy for English Readers (1889, online)
- The Greek World under Roman Sway from Polybius to Plutarch (1890, online);
- The Flinders Petrie Papyri, with Transcriptions, Commentaries and Index, I-II (1891–1893); II-III (1893–1895);
- Problems in Greek History(1892);
- The Empire of the Ptolemies (1895);
- A History of Egypt under the Ptolemaic Dynasty (1899);
- An Epoch in Irish History: Trinity College, Dublin, its Foundation and early Fortunes, 1591–1660 (1903);
- The Particular Book of Trinity College, Dublin (1904);
- The Silver Age of the Greek World (1906);
- The Plate in Trinity College, Dublin. A History and a Catalogue (1918).

His translation of Kuno Fischer's Commentary on Kant (1866) and his own exhaustive analysis, with elucidations, of Kant's critical philosophy are also highly regarded. He also edited the Petrie papyri in the Cunningham Memoirs (vols. VIII (1891), IX (1893), XI (1905)).

== See also ==
- Schema (Kant)
- Oscar Wilde's review of Mahaffy's book "Greek Life and Thought: from the Age of Alexander to the Roman Conquest" in the Pall Mall Gazette, Mr. Mahaffy's New Book, 9 November 1887. In a generally scathing review, Wilde remarks: "in his attempts to treat the Hellenic world as ‘Tipperary writ large,’ to use Alexander the Great as a means of whitewashing Mr. Smith, and to finish the battle of Chæronea on the plains of Mitchelstown, Mr. Mahaffy shows an amount of political bias and literary blindness that is quite extraordinary."

== Sources ==
Academic offices
Preceded by Anthony Traill	Provost of Trinity College Dublin; 1914–1919	Succeeded by John Henry Bernard
