= Walter G. Strickland =

English art historian, bibliographer, and antiquary

- Born: Walter George Strickland; 3 June 1850; Sizergh castle, Kendal, Westmorland, England
- Died: 26 October 1929 (aged 79); Newtown House, Blackrock, County Dublin, Ireland

Walter G. Strickland (3 June 1850 – 26 October 1928) was an English art historian, bibliographer, and antiquary. He wrote A dictionary of Irish artists (1913).

== Early life and family ==
Walter George Strickland was born at Sizergh castle, Kendal, Westmorland, England on 3 June 1850. His father was Thomas Strickland. He attended Ushaw College, Durham, and King's College, London. He spent time living with his uncle, who was an agent for Viscount Dillon, in the west of Ireland. He travelled widely, and while in Australia in 1874, he married Margaret Ryan. She was the daughter of Patrick Ryan, of Sevenhills, South Australia. They had one daughter and one son. The Stricklands lived at 50 Waterloo Road, Dublin, moving to 118 Baggot Street in the 1920s, and finally Newtown House, Blackrock, County Dublin. Strickland died on 26 October 1928 at the family home.

== Career ==
Strickland became the registrar of the National Gallery of Ireland (NGI) in 1894, a post he held until 1914. In this position he made important contributions to the study of historical painting and portraiture, compiling a catalogue of the Gallery's national portraits, utilising his knowledge of Irish biography. He was the appointed to the first editorial subcommittee of the newly formed Georgian Society, and was editor of the Society's first two journal volumes in 1909 and 1910. The Walpole Society published his article on Hugh Douglas Hamilton in 1913. His 20 years of research into Irish art and artists was eventually published in his 1913 A Dictionary of Irish artists. As well as presenting biographies of artists active in Ireland, it also covered engravers, sculptors, art societies and institutions. The book remains a reference work for the study of art and artists in Ireland. He excluded architects with the intention of covering them in another volume.

After the death of Hugh Lane in May 1915, Strickland was appointed director of the NGI. He oversaw a new arrangement of the Gallery before he retired in June 1916. Two articles by him were published in the Irish Monthly on Pictures in the National Gallery in 1916, and A Descriptive Catalogue of the Pictures, Busts, and Statues in Trinity College Dublin, and in the Provost's House, also in 1916. In 1917, Strickland was elected a member of the Royal Irish Academy (RIA), and served on its council twice, from 1919 to 1922 and 1924 to 1927, while serving as the vice-president for times between 1920 and 1927. The Academy requested that he examine its portraits with a view to their preservation in 1919. In 1921 he delivered a lecture to the RIA entitled The ancient system of municipal government in Dublin, its origin and development.

In a collaboration with Francis Elrington Ball, he worked on corrections and marginal notes for Dublin street names by Christopher Teeling McCready (1892), presenting the Royal Society of Antiquaries of Ireland (RSAI) with their copy in 1917. He had a particular interest in mezzotint engraving which led him to research the history of Dublin city, lecturing the Bibliographical Society of Ireland in 1919 on early Dublin book illustrations. He delivered another paper to the Society in 1920 on type-founding in Dublin, which was later published as a monograph in 1921. In 1925, he served as the Society's president. In 1919, he delivered a short paper on a 1750 Dublin edition of the Book of Common Prayer recently presented to the society to the RSAI, which questioned the commonly held assumption that it had belonged to the Irish House of Commons. From 1920 to 1927 he served as honorary general secretary of the RSAI, resigning due to declining health.
