= Ardbraccan House =

Palladian house in County Meath, Ireland

- Ard Breacáin
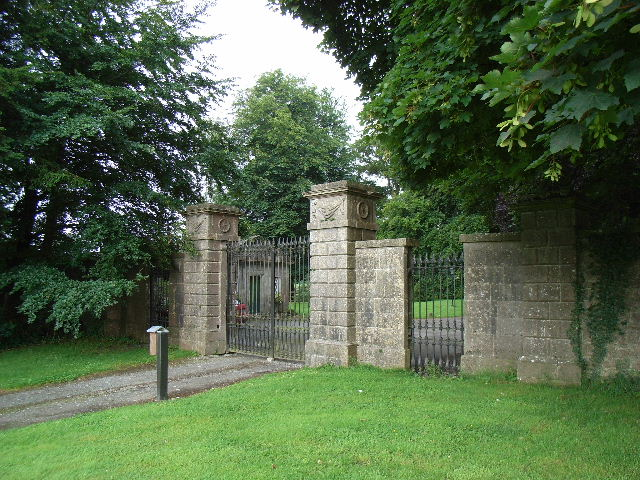
- Original Georgian entrance gates to the Ardbraccan Estate completed circa 1770.

- Location within Ireland
- Former names: Ardbraccan Palace
- Alternative names: Bishop's Palace

General information
- Type: House
- Architectural style: Palladian
- Location: Ardbraccan, County Meath, Ireland
- Coordinates: 53.6609352°N 6.7502167°W
- Elevation: 61 m (200 ft)
- Estimated completion: 1735 (wings), 1776 (central block)
- Owner: Charles Noell (2013)

Height
- Height: 21 m (69 ft)

Technical details
- Material: Ardbraccan limestone
- Floor count: 3
- Grounds: 49 ha (120 acres)

Design and construction
- Architects: Richard Castle (wings) (1734); Thomas Cooley, James Wyatt and Daniel Augustus Beaufort (central block) (1772-76)
- Developer: Arthur Price (bishop) (1734); Henry Maxwell (bishop) (1770s)

Ardbraccan House (known sometimes historically as Ardbraccan Palace) (Irish: Ard Breacáin - high place of Saint Brecan) is a large Palladian country house in the townland of Ardbraccan, County Meath, Ireland. The historic house served from the 1770s to 1885 as the residence of the Church of Ireland Lord Bishop of Meath.

== History ==
Ardbraccan itself had been the location of the residence of a Catholic bishop for over one thousand years, first of the Bishop of Ardbraccan and, later, following the merger of many small dioceses into the Diocese of Meath, as the residence of the Bishop of Meath. By the Middle Ages a large Tudor house, containing its own church, known as St. Mary's, stood on the site.

=== Current structure ===
In 1734, Bishop Arthur Price (1678-1752) decided to replace the decaying mansion with a fashionable new Georgian Palladian residence. Initially the two wings of the house were built to the design of the 18th-century German architect Richard Castle but work later ceased when Price was raised to the Archbishopric of Cashel.

The main four-bay two-storey block of the house was later completed in the 1770s by Bishop Maxwell to the design of James Wyatt but later altered and executed by Thomas Cooley and Daniel Augustus Beaufort.

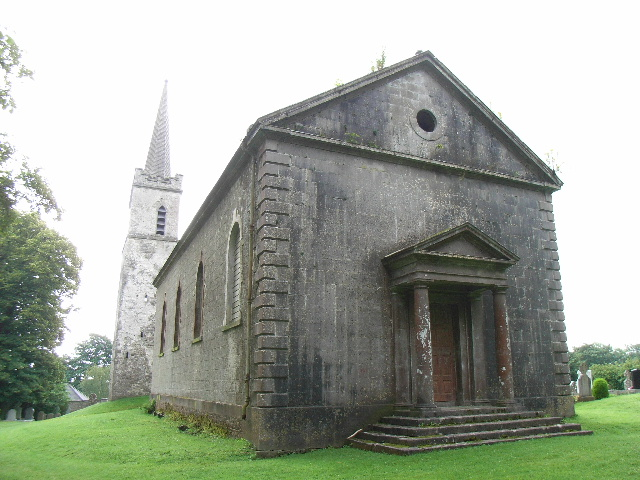
St. Ultan's parish church built around 1770 to the design of Daniel Augustus Beaufort.

The local Church of Ireland parish church St Ultan's, was also built around the same time and is also attributed to Daniel Augustus Beaufort and named for Ultan of Ardbraccan.

Maxwell's successor, Thomas O'Beirne later developed many of the outbuildings and improved the estate in line with the initial plans of Beaufort including building a linking tunnel from the house to the stable block and outbuildings.

=== 1885 sale ===
The new bishop's palace became famous for its architecture. Funded by government grants and locally paid tithes, the Church of Ireland bishop held court from the mansion, which was the centre of a large agricultural demesne. However the disestablishment of the Church of Ireland in 1871 as the state church, following the previous scrapping of Roman Catholic-paid tithes, fatally weakened the economic survival of the bishop's estate, which was left totally reliant on a small local Church of Ireland community, and in 1885 the bishop sold the estate and house, moving to a smaller mansion nearby named Bishopscourt.

Ardbraccan House was then bought by the eldest son of Hugh Law, a former Lord Chancellor of Ireland, and remained in the ownership of his descendants until sold by Colonel Owen Foster in 1985 to Tara Mines, who used it as a guest residence for visiting businessmen.

=== 1990s restoration ===
In the late 1990s, the house was bought by David Maher who completely restored the house. In 2002 the restoration of Ardbraccan House won An Taisce's Best Restoration of a Private Building award, and it was opened to the public.

=== M3 motorway ===
In the early 2000s, the (Meath) planning authority approved controversial plans to build a major new motorway linking Clonee and Kells through part of the house's historic demesne. The Irish Georgian Society and environmentalists criticised the proposal. The M3 motorway eventually opened in 2010.

=== Recent ownership ===
In 2013 the property was sold to Charles Noell for €4.9m who had previously been the underbidder on nearby Dowth Hall. In 2025 the property was put on the market again by Charles Noell with an asking price of €10.15m.

=== Controversy ===
Legend suggested that gravestones from a neighbouring Catholic cemetery at Markiestown, some miles away, were removed and used as the steps into the servants' quarters in the residence. Whether that was an urban myth based on the intense rivalry between the state-established Church of Ireland and the local, predominantly Catholic, population in Bohermeen (who were subject to the discriminatory Penal Laws and forced to pay tithes to the Church of Ireland) or had some basis in fact, is unclear. It is possible that the house utilised stone from the derelict pre-Reformation church at the cemetery, though it was notable that from the mid to late eighteenth century the cemetery was denuded of all gravestones.

== See also ==
- Bellinter House
