= Bohermeen =

Roman Catholic church parish in Ireland

Bohermeen is a Roman Catholic parish in the Diocese of Meath in Ireland. Its English name is a corruption of an ancient Irish language name, An Bóthar Mín, meaning "the smooth road". Originally one of the five famed ancient roadways that led from the mediaeval capital of Ireland, Tara, approximately 10 miles away cut through the area. The quality of the roadway, in an era of dirt-roads, earned for it the nickname of the smooth road, An Bóthar Mín.

== History ==
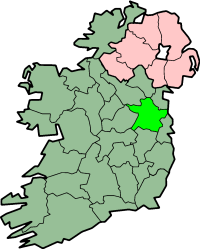
Bohermeen is located in County Meath (light green on map).

For nearly fourteen hundred years the local area went by the name of Ardbraccan or Ard Braccan, meaning "height of Braccan", the hill on which St. Braccan located his mediaeval monastery and which in the 9th century became a diocese with its own bishop. Even when the diocese of Ardbraccan joined with other small dioceses such as Fore and Kells to form the Diocese of Meath, Braccan's hill became the location of the palace of the Bishop of Meath.

Following the establishment of the (Anglican) Church of Ireland Ardbraccan became the seat of the Protestant Lord Bishop of Meath. Anglican bishops continued to live in the area until 1958. When in the nineteenth century the Roman Catholic Church re-established a local parish in the area, it was decided to use a different name to the local Church of Ireland parish of Ardbraccan. 'Bohermeen' became the chosen name. A curate in the parish of Navan, the large town nearby, Dean Cogan, who himself had once served as a curate in Bohermeen, and who wrote the acclaimed History of the Diocese of Meath (2 volumes) in the 1860s bemoaned the choice of the secular Bohermeen (or Bohermien as he wrote it) as the parish name ahead of the more religious Ardbraccan name.

== Population and landholdings ==
The area known as Bohermeen has had a predominantly Roman Catholic population according to every census done. It did, however, have a sizeable Church of Ireland population, though that dwindled significantly in the 19th and 20th centuries. The population was hit to a minor extent by the Great Famine in the mid-19th century. Local folklorists record the disappearance of entire pre-famine settlements in, for example, the townland of Greetiagh within the parish. Though the records of the period are scant, folklore recorded anonymous deaths of parishioners in some of the ancient mediaeval graveyards, notably at Markiestown, where the last burials in the ancient (now destroyed) cemetery were believed to have occurred in the famine era.

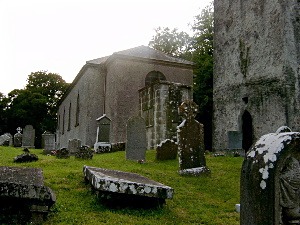
The now deconsecrated Anglican St Ultan's Church

The landholdings of the era were recorded as part of Griffith's Valuation, a major land survey carried out in Ireland between 1848 and 1864. The major land reform of the late 19th century changed the landownership pattern. The breakup of the large estates of the gentry saw most parishioners move from being tenant farmers to small landowners in their own right.

As late as the 1930s, a project carried out by the Irish Folklore Commission, in which school children were asked to write down their description of their areas, recorded that most houses in the area were thatched cottages. However almost all the traditional thatched houses were knocked down in succeeding decades.

== Environment ==
The parish of Bohermeen contains within its boundaries Faughan Hill, a relatively high hill on the flat plains of Meath, where it was claimed the ancient Irish king Niall of the Nine Hostages was buried. It also contains a Palladian country houses. This house, Ardbraccan House, was the residence of the Church of Ireland Bishop of Meath until 1885. The area also contains an ancient tower house known as Durhamstown Castle, which was once owned by the Earl of Essex.

== St Ultan's Church ==
The main parish church, St. Ultan's, was first built in the pre-Catholic Emancipation era, in 1817. It was built in cruciform form. The cultural and class divisions of 19th-century Ireland were reflected in the usage of the building. In the aftermath of the Roman Catholic revival of the 1850s, Catholic social and gender mores were reflected in the usage of the building, with different sides of the aisle described by the community as "men's" and "women's".

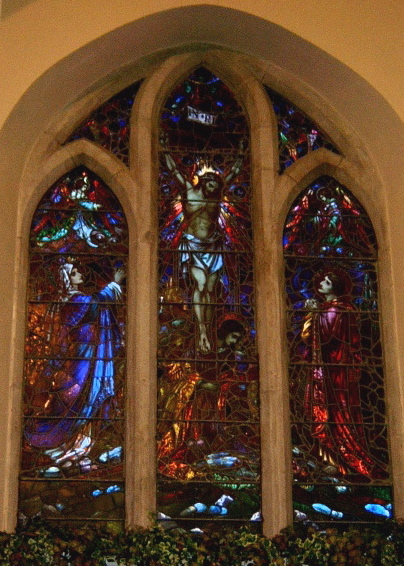
Stained glass window in St Ultan's Church

The building underwent periodic renovations. A new roof was added in 1897 while the wooden altar was replaced by a new set of marble altar, altar rails and reredos. A set of new stained glass windows were installed, including a window of the crucifixion over the reredos and main altar.

The church was re-ordered in the aftermath of Vatican II. In the mid-1980s, a complete rebuild of the church was undertaken. It was squared instead of remaining cruciform, with its high stained glass windows relocated. The reredos and altar rails were removed, while the tabernacle was re-located.

== Organisation of the parish ==
Bohermeen parish itself consists of three sub-parishes; Bohermeen itself, Boyerstown and Cortown, each with their own church, St. Ultan's (formerly called St. Cuthbert's), St. Cuthbert's and Christ the King respectively. It covers an area once served by a large number of mediaeval parishes, including Moyaher, Killenagolach (later called Grange) and Markiestown (also called Durhamstown - which over the centuries was spelt variously as 'Dormstown', 'Durmstown' and 'Dorreanstown'). None of these have surviving churches, as all were destroyed during the Reformation and the Penal period. Some old graveyards do survive, notably at Moyaher, which contains rare surviving examples of pre-Irish Great Famine gravestones and their unique carvings. The remains of cemetery at Markiestown, (a large mound in the centre of a very large field) having survived the reformation and the famine, was controversially bulldozed in the 1970s to create land for tillage.

== Decline in the Church of Ireland community ==
=== Disestablishment and land reform ===
The Ardbraccan/Bohermeen area contained a thriving Protestant community until the early twentieth century. However a series of unrelated economic, social and religious changes led to the large-scale disappearance of the Church of Ireland community.

These changes included the disestablishment of the Church of Ireland in 1869 which undermined the financial viability of the Church of Ireland Bishop of Meath's landed estate and led to the laying off of his mainly Protestant staff and the land reforms of the 1880s to the early 1900s, which saw the breakup of the large Protestant estates such as the Waller estate at Allenstown House, and their sale to their Catholic tenantry, again costing many local Protestants their jobs running the estates.

=== The Great War and Ne Temere ===
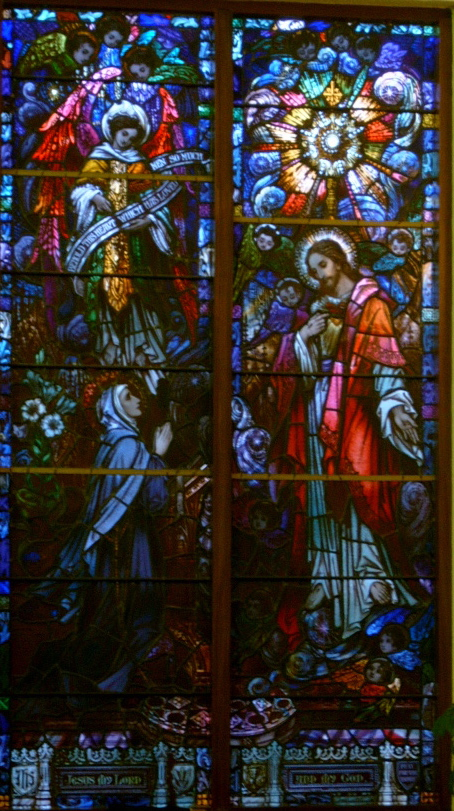
An early 20th century window in Bohermen RC Church which shows Christ the King.

The impact of the First World War, when many Irish Protestant families lost some or all of their sons at Ypres and the Somme left large numbers of families without heirs and Protestant daughters without Protestant potential husbands, had a devastating impact, an impact augmented separately by Pope Pius X's Ne Temere decree, which demanded that all children of Catholic-Protestant marriages be brought up as Catholic (previously, the tradition had been that the boys would be brought up in the religion of their father, the girls in the religion of their mothers). This resulted in a situation where a marriage of a Protestant to a Catholic meant the end of the Protestant line in the family.

In addition, The Troubles during the Irish War of Independence lead many Protestants, who had identified with the ancien regime of British rule in Dublin Castle to move to the United Kingdom. A combination of changing economic structures, changing class structures, changing religious structures, changing political structures, changing marriage patterns and the First World War produced a terminal decline in the numbers of Protestants in the area. Whereas once the Protestant community counted among its number one bishop, two churches, all the landed gentry, many of their staff and a local rector, as well as a local Protestant primary school, all have gone, with the ancient St. Ultan's Church of Ireland in Ardbraccan ceasing to be used for Divine Service in 1981. One of the last members of the Church of Ireland in the locality, the former owner of Durhamstown Castle, Samuel McClelland, died in 2002. Members of his family still reside in Durhamstown to this day.

=== 1980s ===
An early 20th century window in Bohermen RC Church showing the coronation of the Blessed Virgin Mary.

In the mid-1980s, the former owner of Ardbraccan House, Colonel Foster, decided to repair the dangerously decayed roof on the thousand-year-old church spire at the deconsecrated Anglican Church, local timber merchants supplied timber for the work free of charge, along with staff to do the reroofing. When Colonel and Mrs Foster, who had moved into the old schoolhouse at the entrance to the Anglican Church grounds, decided to take on the task of restoring the derelict cemetery, in which both Anglican and Catholic people from the area were buried, the local Catholic parish joined the efforts, offering resources and manpower. The communities sought and received state assistance so that the historic burial ground could be fully restored and preserved.

=== 21st century developments ===
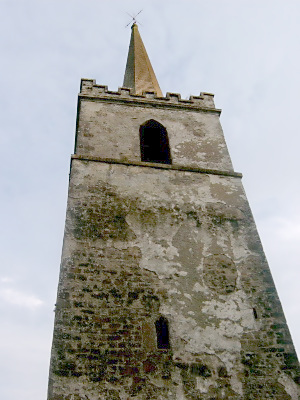
The 1000-year-old tower at St Ultan's (deconsecrated) Anglican Church was reroofed in the mid-1980s.

Just as its nearest town, Navan, has become a 'dormitory town' to Dublin 30 miles away, so it has become a collection of dormitory townlands to Navan. Whereas most of its employment was once farm-based, over 40% now would in urban centres, Trim, Kells, Navan and Dublin, commuting long distances.

The M3 motorway, completed in 2010 to link the towns of Cavan and Kells with Dublin, cut through farmland within sight of Ardbraccan House and the ancient monastery site in Ardbraccan. It also passed near the archaeologically sensitive site at the Hill of Tara.

== Sport ==
St. Ultans Ladies Football Club have won the Meath Senior Championship on three occasions. The most recent of these wins came in September 2015 after a replayed final in Carlonstown against Oldcastle Ladies. This game, watched by an estimated 1500 people, was the largest ever attendance of a ladies club match in County Meath.
