= Ardbraccan =

Ancient place of worship in County Meath, Ireland

Coordinates: 53.65373°N 6.74835°W

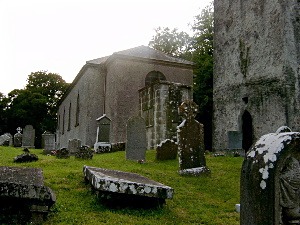
St. Ultan's Church of Ireland, built in the 18th century, was deconsecrated in 1981 by the Church of Ireland

Ardbraccan (Irish: Ard Breacáin) is a civil parish and townland in County Meath, Ireland. Ardbraccan is the location of the former residence of the Catholic, then, after the Reformation, the Church of Ireland Bishop of Meath. It was also a place of prominence in pre-Christian Pagan history. Ardbraccan is approximately 52 km (32 miles) from Dublin and 4 km (2.5 miles) from Navan.

== Name ==
The original name for Ardbraccan is said to have been Magh Tortain named after the Uí Tuirtri people of the Oirghalla. The area is said to have maintained strong druidic traditions until St. Brecan converted the local Uí Borthim tribe in the 6th century. It was home to 2 of Ireland's sacred Celtic trees - Bile Tortain and the Mullyfaughan tree. There are many local druid wells in the area, 2 of which were dedicated to St. Ultan of Ardbraccan and St. Brigid after the introduction of Christianity.

The current name of Ardbraccan originates from the Irish placename Ard Breacáin, meaning the heights or hill of Breacán. St. Breacán (anglacised as Brecan or Braccan) was the founder of a Christian monastery in the locality. He is thought to have established a monastery on a high mound in the sixth or early seventh century. On this high point, a monastery and a succession of churches were built, each larger than the last to accommodate the growing number of religious worshippers. This included a large circular church known Daimhliag ("stone house").

Ardbraccan is mentioned in Cogad Gaedel re Gallaib as the site of a victory of the Uí Néill over the Vikings sometime in the mid-9th century. However the accuracy of this medieval text is questionable and has been cited as propaganda.

== History ==
=== Early medieval raids ===
The settlements and churches at Ardbraccan were raided and destroyed many times from at least 866. Known raids include:

- 886, 940, 949, 992 The area was attacked and plundered by the Danes.
- 1031 The Abbey was raided and burned down by the Danes of Dublin led by Sitric. It is said that 200 people were sheltering from the raid in the Daimhliag, and perished when the raisers set it alight. A further 200 people were taken into captivity The attack is referenced in The Annals of Tigernach.
- 1035 Ardbraccan was again attacked by the Danes, which led to Conchobar Ua Máelshechlainn plundering and burning Swords in retaliation.
- 1069 attacked by an army led by Murchad. He is said to have burned down many buildings before receiving being mortally wounded.
- 1109 attacked by the Uí Briain's of Munster. The Annals of Tigernach note the churches were destroyed and "humans were burned alive and captives taken out of it".
- 1115 attacked by the Munster men and the Damliag was destroyed once again.
- 1133
- 1136 attacked by Dermot MacMurrough and the Danes, including the stealing of cattle.

=== Visit by King John ===
On 29 June 1210, King John of England, Lord of Ireland and his forces met with Cathal Crobhderg, King of Connacht and his men in Ardbraccan before proceeding north to attack the forces of Hugh de Lacy, 1st Earl of Ulster.

=== Diocese of Ardbraccan ===
The early Irish church possessed many bishoprics or dioceses and, for a period, Ardbraccan was a diocese, with a large urban centre attached. Under the Synod of Kells in 1152, Ardbraccan was united with the Sees of Clonard, Trim, Dunshaughlin, Slane and Fore, forming with other small dioceses the Diocese of Meath. The bishop of the newly merged diocese lived in Ardbraccan.

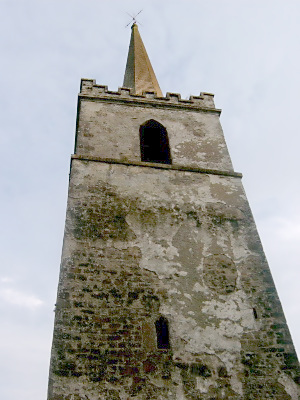
The church tower at Ardbraccan predates the church on the site by over 700 years. It was scheduled for demolition when the new church was built in the 1700s, but the plans fell through and the medieval tower avoided demolition.

When the Irish church was ordered to formally break its link with the Roman Catholic Church to become the Church of Ireland in the 16th century, the Anglican (Church of Ireland) Bishop of Meath continued to live in Ardbraccan in an estate attached to the main church. In this period, Ardbraccan possessed two churches: St. Mary's (which was located in the Bishop's residence) and St. Ultan's, which was named after a local saint who had lived in St. Braccan's day.

In 1777, a new Church of Ireland church was erected on the site of the earlier church of St. Ultan's. This church, built to a design by Rev. Dr. Daniel Augustus Beaufort, remained in use until 1981 when it was deconsecrated due to the dwindling size of the Church of Ireland community in Ardbraccan. While, in 1868, the Ecclesiastical Commissioners of Ireland recorded that there were 267 members of the Church of Ireland living in Ardbraccan parish, by 1968, their number had dwindled to 10 and it ceased to be used for general worship in 1970. The church was finally offered for sale in 2002. Its cemetery is used for burials by both the local Church of Ireland and Roman Catholic parishes.

The Church of Ireland Bishop of Meath moved out of the 18th century bishop's palace, at Ardbraccan House, in 1885. He moved to live in a smaller mansion nearby, at Bishopscourt. In 1958, the Church of Ireland bishop moved away from Ardbraccan altogether, with Bishopscourt being bought by a Catholic religious order, the Holy Ghost Fathers, who renamed it An Tobar (Irish for "the well", linking it to an ancient well at Ardbraccan associated with St. Ultan). When the old church was subject to some vandalism, its stained glass windows were removed by the Church of Ireland and donated to An Tobar.

While the Church of Ireland community used the name 'Ardbraccan' to refer to its parish, the nearby Roman Catholic parish in the 19th century opted to use a different name, "Bohermeen", from the Irish an bóthar mín, meaning 'the smooth road'.

=== Schools ===
In 1747, the first Irish Charter School was opened in Ardbraccan. The Charter Schools admitted only Catholics, under the condition that they be educated as Protestants. These schools were intended, in the words of their programme, "to rescue the souls of thousands of poor children from the dangers of Popish superstition and idolatry, and their bodies from the miseries of idleness and beggary." The Ardbraccan school, like the others, focused on training girls for domestic service in the houses of the gentry and aristocracy, while training boys in agriculture and gardening. As with the other schools, the charter school in Ardbraccan failed and eventually closed down.

== Quarrying ==
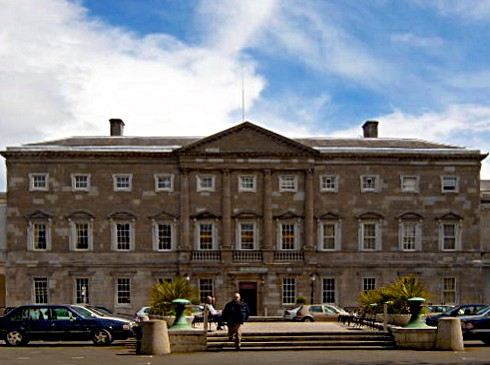
The Irish parliament building is built from Ardbraccan stone.

Ardbraccan is also known for its quarries. These supplied cut stone for a number Irish and British buildings. These include Leinster House, once the Dublin residence of the Duke of Leinster and which is now the seat of the Irish parliament, Oireachtas Éireann. Ardbraccan limestone was also used on the restoration of the Custom House, Dublin after it was burned by the IRA in 1921.

== Notable people ==
- St. Brecan, founded a monastery here.
- St. Ultan, founded a school and succeeded St. Brecan as the local abbott.
- Alexander de Balscot, Bishop of Meath, died here 1400.
- Edmund Oldhall, Bishop of Meath, died here 1459.
- George Montgomery, Bishop of Meath, buried here 1621.
- Richard Pococke, English prelate and anthropologist, and briefly Bishop of Meath - buried here 1765.
- John Cowley, actor, died here 1998.
- Contested: St. Cuthbert. A Durham Cathedral tradition names Ardbraccan as the potential birthplace of St. Cuthbert (under the name "Hardbrecins"). However this is contested as being the result of confusion St. Colomba of nearby Kells.

== See also ==
- Allenstown House, a Georgian mansion, controversially demolished in 1938
- Durhamstown Castle
- Saint Ultan of Ardbraccan
