= Peter Bellew =

Irish businessman

Peter Brendan Bellew
- Born: Bettystown, County Meath, Ireland
- Education: Trinity College Dublin
- Predecessor: Michael Hickey

Peter Brendan Bellew is an Irish businessman who joined low-cost carrier Ryanair as chief operating officer (COO) since 2017. He has been in the tourism and aviation industry over 30 years. In July 2019, Bellew announced that he would be leaving Ryanair at the end of the year, joining rival airline, easyJet. He also served as Chief Operating Officer of Malaysia Airlines from 2015 to 2017.

== Early life ==
Originally from Bettystown, Ireland, he was schooled at CBS St Marys Drogheda before attending C.B.C. Monkstown in Dublin. Bellew graduated with a Bachelor of Business Studies and MA in Economics from Trinity College Dublin in 1987. While at Trinity, he wrote for The Piranha, the college's satirical magazine.

== Early career ==
In 1987, he joined CIE Tours, an Irish coach tour operator, as a manager in charge of its London operations. He subsequently founded Drive Ireland in 1989, Irish Cottage Club in 1998, and also ventured into online travel management with Vbnets / Wapprofit in 2001.

== Aviation career ==
=== Ireland (1993–2015) ===
Bellew's first venture into the aviation industry in a management capacity was in 1993 with Kerry Airport, Killarney, Ireland. Under his tenure as director and general manager, he was credited with being able to substantially increase passenger volume from 6,000 to more than 400,000.

In 2006, Bellew joined Irish low-cost airline Ryanair as deputy director of flight operations, and held various capacities throughout his career there, including head of sales and marketing, director of flight operations, as well as director of training and recruitment.

=== Malaysia Airlines (2015–2017) ===
On 1 September 2015, Bellew joined Malaysian flag carrier Malaysia Airlines from Ryanair as chief operations officer, as part of the airline's ongoing restructuring program amid huge financial losses, compounded by the twin major aviation disasters of Malaysia Airlines Flight 370 and Malaysia Airlines Flight 17 in 2014. Under his tenure, he oversaw parts of the restructuring program led by former Aer Lingus chief Christoph Mueller that saw a 6,000-job cut by the airline.

On 1 July 2016, Bellew officially took over as chief executive officer from Mueller, who resigned from the company less than a year into his contract, citing changing personal circumstances. While it is said that Bellew's appointment ensured continuity to Mueller's unfinished work, it stirred further controversy within Malaysia, as some parties were uncomfortable with the appointment of another foreigner to head the national flag carrier. He was the third CEO of the airline in two years, and only the second ever foreign CEO after Mueller.

=== Ryanair (2017–2019) ===
On 17 October 2017, it was announced that Bellew would return to Ryanair as chief operations officer, replacing Michael Hickey, who resigned following a rostering mishap. Bellew's decision to return to his old role was described as a form of "national service" for "Ireland's greatest company" by Bellew, with him being tasked chiefly with resolving the pilot's dispute. It had been speculated in Ireland and internationally that his return to Ryanair made him the next in line to succeed Michael O'Leary when he retires. After helping to guide the low-cost carrier through crucial pay talks with trade unions, Bellew announced in July 2019 that he would leave the airline at the end of the year.

=== EasyJet (2019–2022) ===
In July 2019 it was reported that Bellew would leave Ryanair to join EasyJet by the end of 2019.

On 6 August 2019 Ryanair responded to this announcement by filing an ultimately unsuccessful lawsuit against Bellew. Ryanair had argued that, on leaving Ryanair Mr. Bellew was in possession of information of competitive value and that he was bound by covenant restraining him from working for another European airline for 12 months. Bellew in this matter fully admits that he freely signed the covenant and at the time of signing he fully understood its meaning and purpose.

On 21 March 2020 easyJet apologised to its staff following the release of a "staff motivation" video by Bellew during the COVID-19 pandemic. Bellew had plagiarised a speech made by Irish Taoiseach, Leo Varadkar. An easyJet pilot was quoted as stating "pilots at easyJet were already appalled at Peter’s conduct this week, "I think this clearly plagiarised speech cements his reputation as being completely untrustworthy". Bellew apologised to the staff and the Taoiseach and stated he would write all of his own speeches in future.

In July 2020, the British Airline Pilots' Association (BALPA) launched a vote of no confidence against Mr Bellew, citing his poor handling of the coronavirus pandemic, bypassing pilot unions and attempting to make 727 UK pilot redundancies with no business justification as reasons for the vote, which is due on Friday 17 July. The result came back with an astonishing 99.9% "no confidence", with over 2000 of the members having responded.

On 4 July 2022 after recent flight cancellations and disruptions it was confirmed by the easyJet CEO that Bellew had resigned as COO "to pursue other business opportunities".

=== Riyadh Air (2023-2025) ===
On 14 March 2023, it was announced that Bellew was appointed Chief Operations Officer at Riyadh Air, a Saudi Arabian carrier.

In May 2025 it was announced that Peter Bellew, the chief operations officer of Riyadh Air, is leaving the start-up Saudi carrier.

== See also ==
- Trinity College Dublin people
