= School of Pharmacy and Pharmaceutical Sciences (Trinity College Dublin) =

Coordinates: 53.342643°N 6.250907°W

- Type: Pharmacy school
- Established: 1977
- Head of School: Professor John Gilmer
- Location: Dublin, Ireland
- Campus: Trinity College Dublin
- Website: http://www.pharmacy.tcd.ie/

The School of Pharmacy and Pharmaceutical Sciences established in 1977, is the pharmacy school of Trinity College Dublin located in Dublin,. It is one of three centres in the Ireland that provides education in Pharmacy. It was based at Woodside House on Shrewsbury Road in Ballsbridge. Since 2006 it is currently housed in the Panoz Institute adjacent to the Hamilton Building at the east end of Trinity College Dublin. The Head of School is Professor John Gilmer.
