= The Piranha =

Satirical newspaper of Trinity College Dublin

- A Political, Literary and General News-Paper
- Type: satirical student newspaper
- Format: Berliner
- School: Trinity College Dublin
- Editor: Tom Cantillon and Manus Dennison
- Founded: 1978
- Headquarters: House 6 Trinity College; Dublin 2, Ireland
- City: Dublin
- Country: Ireland
- Circulation: 6,000

The Piranha is the official satirical newspaper of Trinity College Dublin. Formerly known as Piranha! magazine, it was rebranded in 2009. It is a member of Trinity Publications and is written entirely by students of the university. The first edition claimed that it was established in 1843, and the newspaper's official webpage claims it was first published in 1682, but official college records state that the publication was founded in 1978.

== Production ==
Since 2010, The Piranha has been printed in Berliner format. It was previously a magazine. The newspaper is produced solely by students of the university under the direction of a student editor. The publication typically releases five issues each year including an "Election Special" where they parody candidates in Student Union Elections. Free copies of each edition are distributed around campus. Similar to other student publications in Trinity College, The Piranha is funded by a grant from the Trinity Publications Committee and supplements this with advertising revenue.

== Controversy ==
In February 2006, Trinity College seized almost all copies of Piranha. The controversy was caused by a satirical piece, deemed to be racist. Neither the college nor the DU Publications Committee agreed with the content and offensive language contained in the article. The editor at the time, Paddy Cosgrave, was referred to as "off books", although was registered as a student and was expected to return and complete their studies. Around 1,500 copies were distributed on Thursday 23 February containing an article titled "Stinking sand n*****s outraged by Danish slight on their towel-headed religion", but the following day all remaining copies had been withdrawn from circulation by security staff on the orders of the college authorities. The remaining copies of the magazine were destroyed.

== Notable editors ==
Notable former editors of the publication include Antony Sellers (founding editor 1978–79), Alan Gilsenan (1981–82), Quentin Letts (1984–85), Michael O'Doherty (1985–86), Nick Webb (1990-91), and Paddy Cosgrave (2005–06). Other former writers include comedians Pauline McLynn, Mario Rosenstock, and David O'Doherty as well as airline executive Peter Bellew.

== Awards ==
In 2010, The Piranha was nominated for the People's Choice Award in the National Student Media Awards.
