= Trinity College Dublin =

Sole college of the University of Dublin in Ireland

Coordinates: 53.3444°N 6.2577°W

- Collegium Sanctae et Individuae Trinitatis Reginae Elizabethae juxta Dublin
- University of Dublin
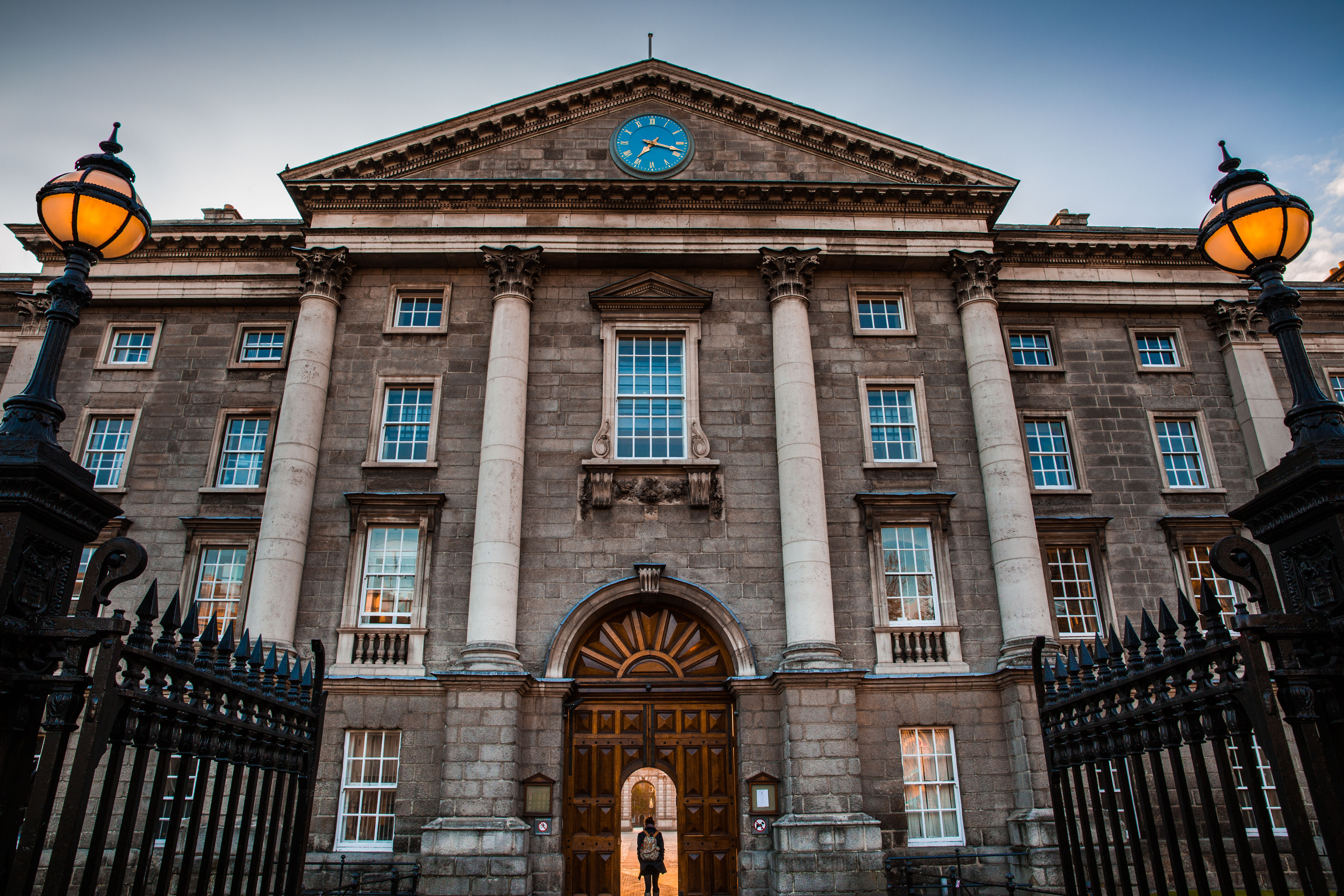
- Entrance gateway on College Green

- Arms: Azure, a Bible closed, clasps to the dexter, a lion passant guardant, on the sinister a harp both of the last, and in base a castle with two towers domed, each surmounted by a flag flotant to the sides of the shield argent.
- Full name: The Provost, Fellows, Foundation Scholars and the other members of Board of the College of the Holy and Undivided Trinity of Queen Elizabeth near Dublin; Irish: Coláiste Thríonóid Naofa Neamhroinnte na Banríona Eilís gar do Bhaile Átha Cliath
- Latin name: Collegium Sanctae et Individuae Trinitatis Reginae Elizabethae juxta Dublin
- Motto: Latin: Perpetuis futuris temporibus duraturam
- Motto in English: It will last into endless future times
- Founder: Queen Elizabeth I
- Established: 3 March 1592; 434 years ago (via royal charter)
- Named for: The Holy Trinity (via Trinity College, Cambridge)
- Architectural style: Neoclassical architecture (majority); Georgian architecture (oldest buildings); Ruskinian Gothic architecture (minority)
- Status: Research university Ancient university
- Colours: Trinity Blue; Spindle; Dark Abbey; Iron
- Sister colleges: Oriel College, Oxford; St John's College, Cambridge
- Freshman dorm: Trinity Hall, Dublin
- President: Linda Doyle (as Provost ex officio)
- Provost: Linda Doyle
- Undergraduates: 14,085 (2023/24)
- Postgraduates: 6,405 (2023/24)
- Newspaper: Trinity News, The Piranha, The University Times, Icarus
- Endowment: €302.9 million (2024)
- Affiliations: CLUSTER; Coimbra Group; LERU; UNITECH; EUA; IUA; AMBA; EUF
- Website: www.tcd.ie

The College of the Holy and Undivided Trinity of Queen Elizabeth near Dublin, branded by the board as Trinity College, the University of Dublin, and officially incorporated as Trinity College Dublin (TCD; Irish: Coláiste na Tríonóide, Baile Átha Cliath), is the sole constituent college of the University of Dublin in Ireland. Founded in 1592 by Queen Elizabeth I through a royal charter, it is one of the seven ancient universities of Great Britain and Ireland. As Ireland's oldest university, Trinity contributed to Irish literature during the Victorian and Georgian eras and played a notable role in the recognition of Dublin as a UNESCO City of Literature.

Trinity was established to consolidate the rule of the Tudor monarchy in Ireland, with Provost Adam Loftus christening it after Trinity College, Cambridge. Built on the site of the former Priory of All Hallows demolished by King Henry VIII, it was the Protestant university of the Ascendancy ruling elite for over two centuries, and was therefore associated with social elitism for most of its history. Trinity has three faculties comprising 25 schools, and affiliated institutions include the Royal Irish Academy of Music, the Lir Academy, and the Irish School of Ecumenics. It is a member of LERU and the Coimbra Group. Trinity College Dublin is one of the two sister colleges of both Oriel College, Oxford, and St John's College, Cambridge, and through mutual incorporation, the three universities have retained an academic partnership since 1636.

The college contains several landmarks such as the Campanile, the Graduates Memorial Building, and The Rubrics. The 16th century Trinity library is a legal deposit library that serves both Ireland and the United Kingdom, and has housed the Book of Kells since 1661, the Trinity College harp since 1782, and a copy of the Proclamation of the Irish Republic since 1916. A major destination in Ireland's tourism, the college grounds receive over two million visitors annually, and has been used as a location in movies and novels. Trinity is also home to the world's oldest chairs in French, German, Irish, and English literature, as well as the world's oldest student society, The Hist, which was founded in 1770.

Notable alumni of Trinity include literary figures Oscar Wilde, Jonathan Swift, Samuel Beckett, Bram Stoker, Sheridan Le Fanu, Oliver Goldsmith, Thomas Moore, J. M. Synge, and William Congreve; authors Eoin Colfer, John Boyne, and J. P. Donleavy; writers David Benioff and Sally Rooney; statesman Éamon de Valera; philosophers George Berkeley and Edmund Burke; and recipients of the Nobel Prize, the Pulitzer Prize, and the Booker Prize. (Note: Best-selling novelists of all time: Eoin Colfer, John Boyne, and J. P. Donleavy) (Note: Nobel Prize: Samuel Beckett, Ernest Walton, William C. Campbell, Mairead Maguire; Pulitzer Prize: Mary Jordan; Booker Prize: Anne Enright; Windham-Campbell Prize: Deirdre Madden, Sonya Kelly, Anne Enright; Tang Prize: Mary Robinson) Trinity alumni also invented the binaural stethoscope, steam turbine, graphophone, and hypodermic needle; pioneered seismology, leprosy cure, radiotherapy, and linear algebra; performed the first artificial nuclear transmutation; and coined the term electron. (Note: The binaural stethoscope was invented by Arthur Leared in 1851.; The hypodermic needle was invented by Francis Rynd in 1844.; The steam turbine was invented by Sir Charles Algernon Parsons in 1884.; Linear algebra was developed from the invention of quaternions by Sir William Rowan Hamilton in 1843, and he is credited as one of its co-founders.; Seismology was coined by Robert Mallet in 1857, and he is regarded as the founding father.; Clofazimine was discovered by Vincent Barry in 1954, and it significantly improved leprosy treatment.; Avermectin was discovered by William C. Campbell in 1973.; Nuclear transmutation and nuclear reaction were both artificially co-produced by Ernest Walton in 1932.; Electron terminology was coined by George Johnstone Stoney in 1891.; Graphophone was co-invented by Chichester Bell in 1886.; Harvard University sixth President Increase Mather.; University of Oxford first female Vice-Chancellor Louise Richardson.; John Joly pioneered the "Dublin method" of radiotherapy in 1914.) Additionally, the university has produced two prime ministers, four presidents, and fourteen chief justices of Ireland. (Note: Presidents: Douglas Hyde, Éamon de Valera, Mary Robinson, Mary McAleese; Prime Ministers: Éamon de Valera, Leo Varadkar)

== History ==
=== First 50 years ===
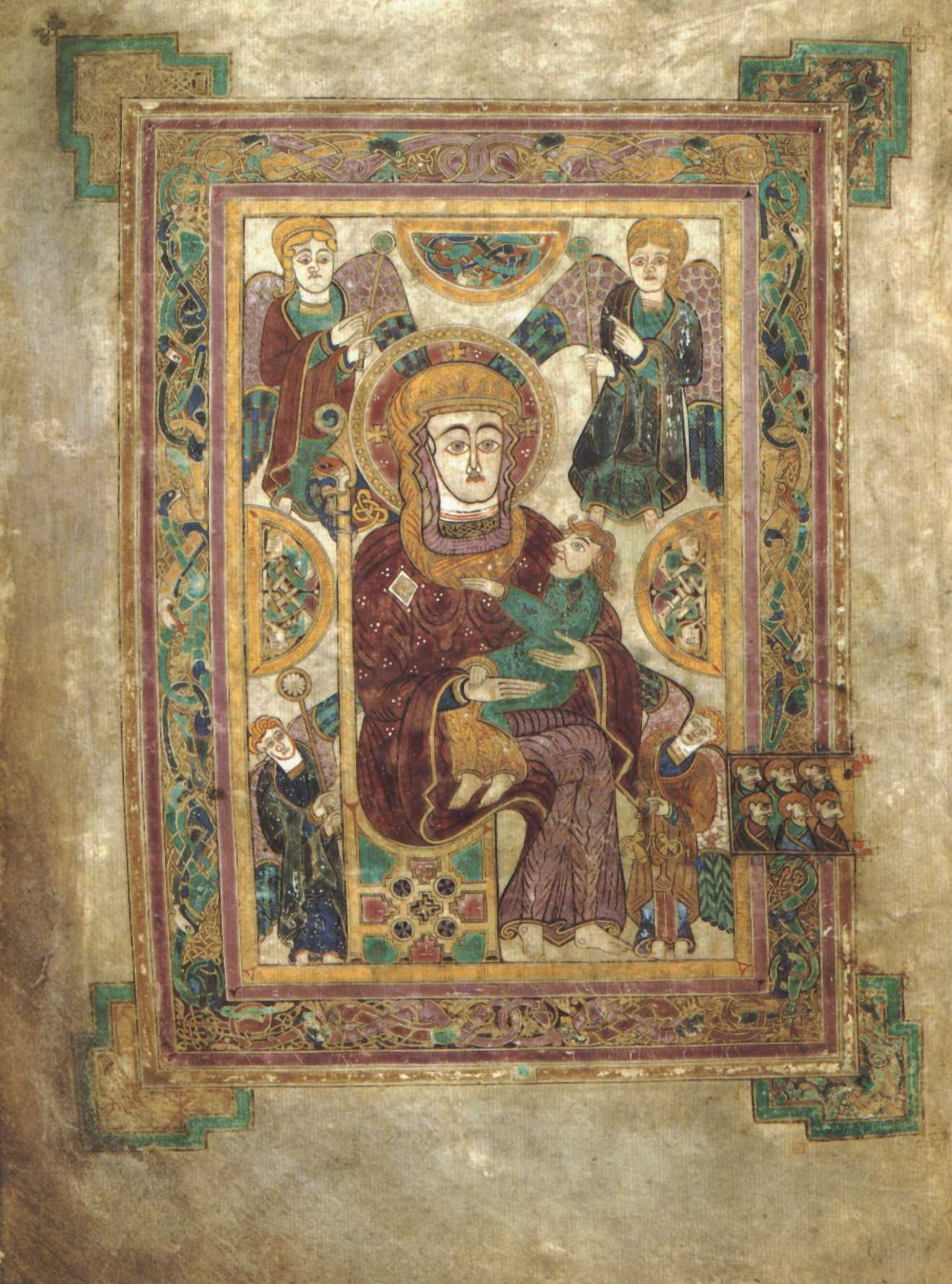
The Book of Kells is the most famous of the volumes in the Trinity College Library. Shown here are the Madonna and Child from Kells (folio 7v).

A medieval University of Dublin was founded in 1320 under a papal brief issued by Pope Clement V in 1311, and the university maintained an intermittent existence at St. Patrick's Cathedral over the following centuries, but it did not flourish and finally came to an end during the Reformation period. After that, and some debate about a new university at St. Patrick's Cathedral, in 1592 a small group of Dublin citizens obtained a charter by way of letters patent from Queen Elizabeth I, (Note: Extracts from Letters Patent ("First or Foundation Charter") of Elizabeth I, 1592: "...we...found and establish a College, mother of a (the) University, near the town of Dublin for the better education, training and instruction of Anglo-Protestant scholars and students in our realm...and also that provision should be made...for the relief and support of a provost and some fellows and scholars...it shall be called THE COLLEGE OF THE HOLY AND UNDIVIDED TRINITY NEAR DUBLIN FOUNDED BY THE MOST SERENE QUEEN ELIZABETH.") incorporating Trinity College at the former site of the disbanded Augustinian Priory of All Hallows, immediately southeast of the city walls, provided by the Corporation of Dublin.

The college's first provost was the Archbishop of Dublin, Adam Loftus (after whose former college at Cambridge the institution was named), and he was provided with two initial Fellows, James Hamilton and James Fullerton. Two years after the foundation, a few Fellows and students began to work in the new college, which then lay around one small square.

During the initial 50 years following the foundation, the community increased the endowments, considerable landed estates were secured, and new fellowships and academic chairs were established. The books which formed the foundation of the great library were acquired, either by private purchase or donations, a curriculum was devised, and statutes were framed. Trinity College Dublin is one of the two sister colleges of both Oriel College, Oxford, and St John's College, Cambridge, and through mutual incorporation, the three universities have retained an academic partnership since 1636.

=== 18th and 19th centuries ===
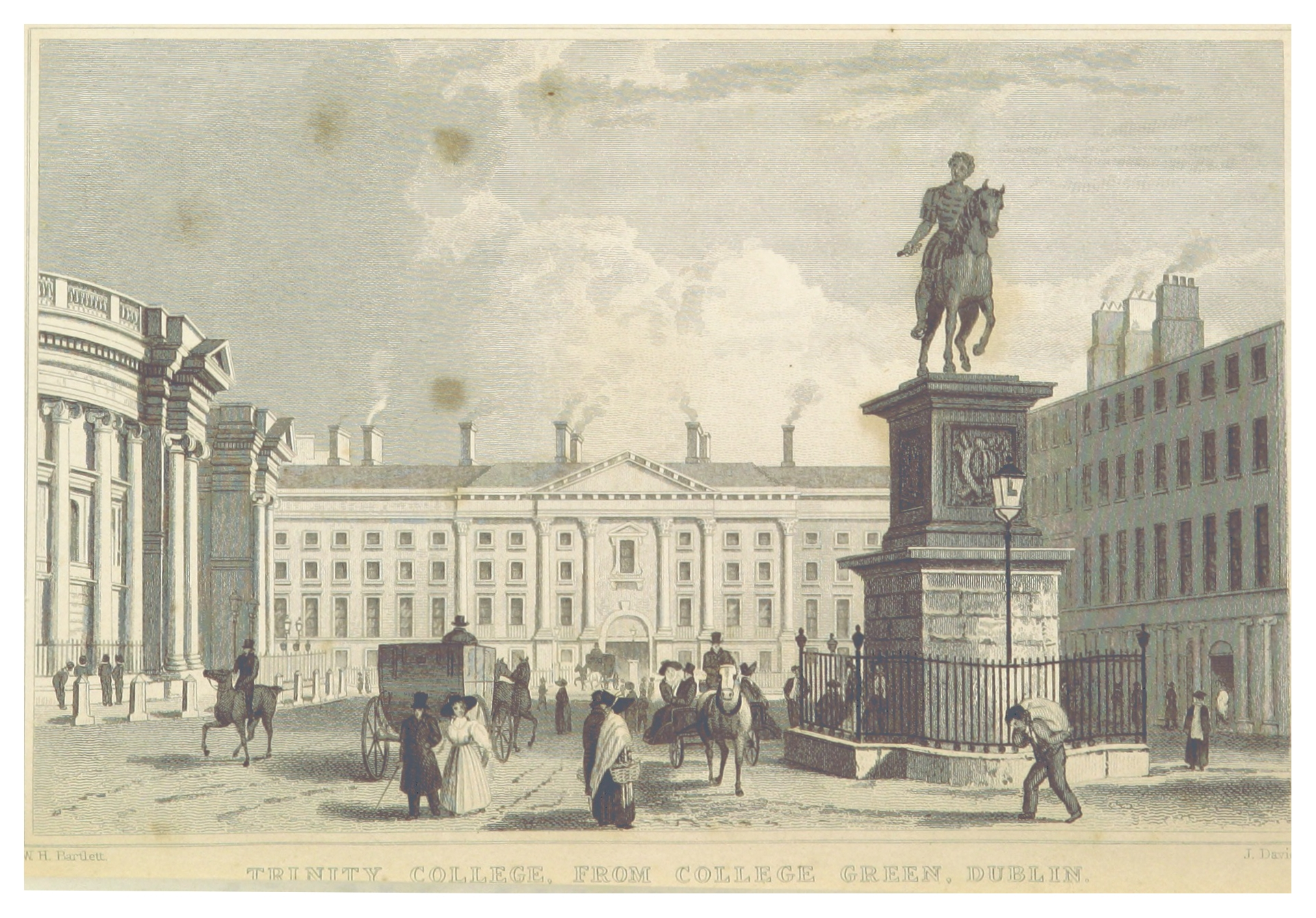
Main entrance (1837)

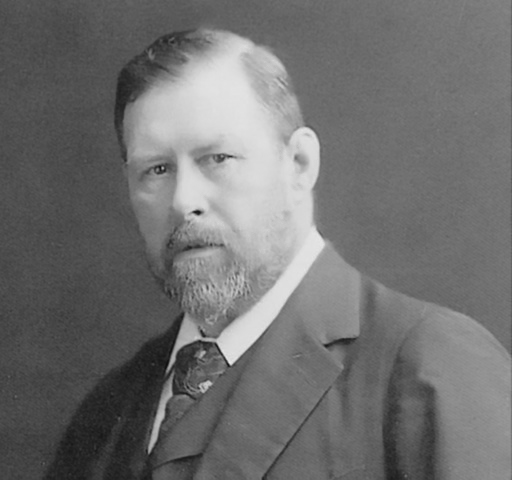
Bram Stoker, Trinity graduate and author of Dracula

During the 18th century, Trinity College was seen as the university of the Protestant Ascendancy. The Parliament of Ireland, meeting on the other side of College Green, made generous grants for building the College's 18th-century neoclassical Parliament square. The first building of this period was the Old Library, begun in 1712, followed by The Printing House and the Dining Hall. During the second half of the century, the Parliament Square slowly emerged. The great building drive was mostly completed by the early 19th century with the inauguration of the Botany Bay, the square which derives its name in part from the herb garden it once contained. Today, the square contains Trinity College's own Botanic Gardens. Between the 18th and 19th centuries, Trinity became home to the world's oldest chairs in French (1776), German (1776), Irish (1840), and English literature (1867).

The 19th century was also marked by important developments in the professional schools. The law school was reorganized after the middle of the century. Medical studies had been taught in the college since 1711, but it was only after the establishment of the school on a firm basis by legislation in 1800, and under the inspiration of one Macartney, that it was in a position to play its full part, with such teachers as Graves and Stokes, in the great age of Dublin medicine. The Engineering School was established in 1842, and was among the first of its kind in Ireland and Britain.

From 1592 until 1845, in which year the Queen's Colleges were established in Belfast, Galway and Cork under royal assent through "An Act to enable Her Majesty to endow new Colleges for the Advancement of Learning in Ireland", the University of Dublin (Trinity College) was Ireland's sole university. St Patrick's College Maynooth had been founded in 1795, but only for the education of priests. The government intended that the Queen's Colleges were to be non-denominational, and were originally known as the 'godless' universities.

==== Access and religion ====
Trinity was originally the university of the Protestant Ascendancy ruling elite for much of its history, given the conditions for its establishment. While Catholics were admitted from the college's foundation, for a period graduation required the taking of an oath that was objectionable to them. This requirement was removed under the Roman Catholic Relief Act 1793, before the equivalent change at the University of Cambridge and the University of Oxford, but certain restrictions on membership of the college remained; professorships, fellowships and scholarships remained reserved only for Protestants. In December 1845, Denis Caulfield Heron was the subject of a hearing at Trinity College. He had previously been examined and, on merit, been declared a Scholar of the college, but had not been allowed to take up his place due to his Catholic religion. Heron appealed to the Irish courts, which issued a writ of mandamus requiring the case to be adjudicated by the Archbishop of Dublin and the Primate of Ireland. The decision of Richard Whately and John George de la Poer Beresford was that Heron would remain excluded from Scholarship. This decision confirmed that students who were not Anglicans (Presbyterians were also affected) could not be elected as Scholars, Fellows, or be made a professor. Within three decades of this, however, all disabilities and restrictions imposed on Catholics were repealed. In 1873, all religious tests, except for those relating to entry to the Divinity school, were abolished by an Act of Parliament.

In 1871, just prior to the full repeal of all limitations on Catholic students, Irish Catholic bishops, responding to the increased ease with which Catholics could attend an institution which the bishops saw as thoroughly Protestant in ethos, and in light of the establishment of the Catholic University of Ireland, implemented a general ban on Catholics entering Trinity College, with few exceptions. "The ban", despite its longevity, is associated in the popular mind with the Archbishop of Dublin John Charles McQuaid, as he was made responsible for enforcing it from 1956 until the Catholic Bishops of Ireland rescinded it in 1970, shortly before McQuaid's retirement. Until 1956, it was the responsibility of each local bishop.

=== 20th century ===
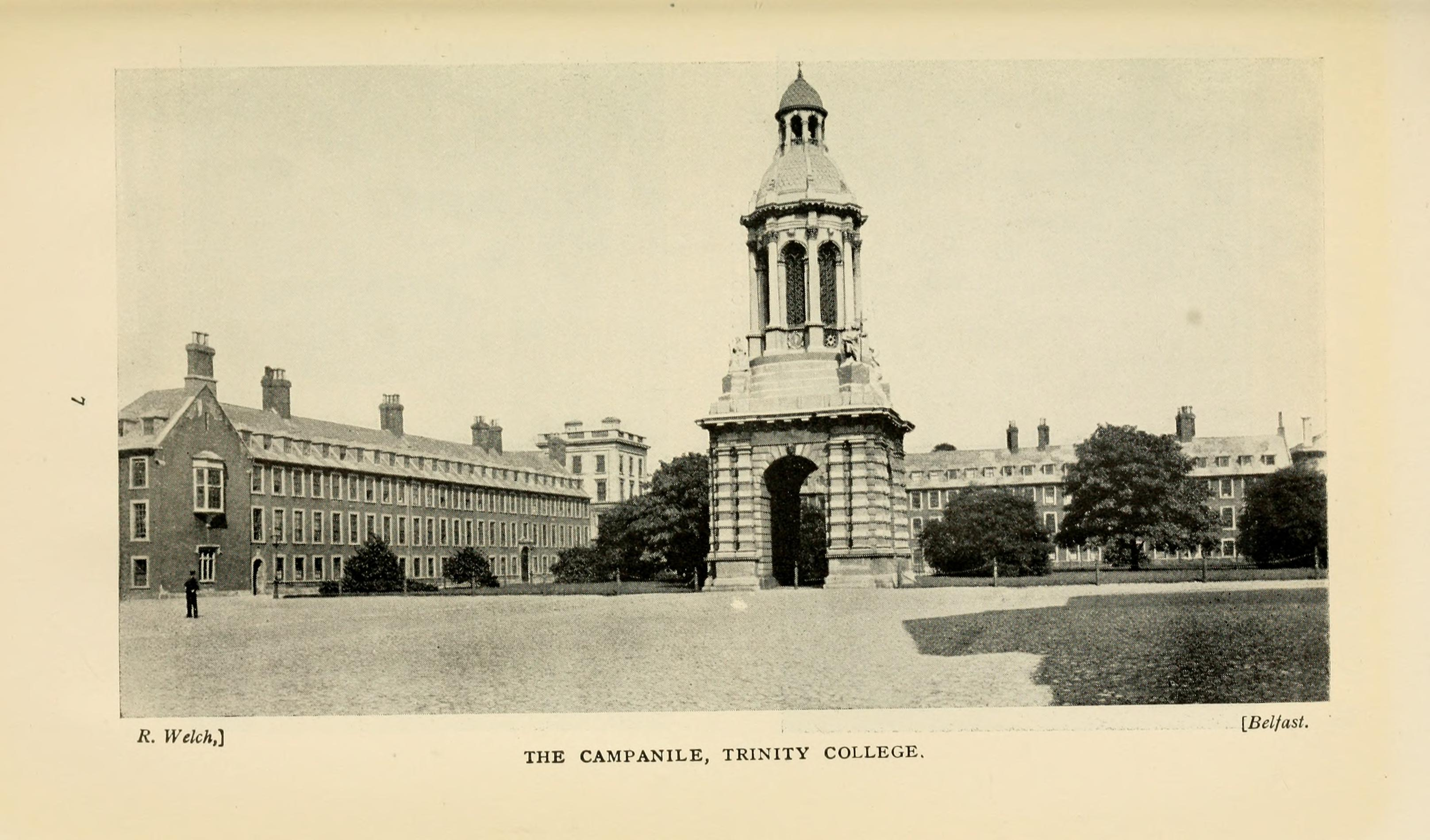
Campanile (pre-1899)

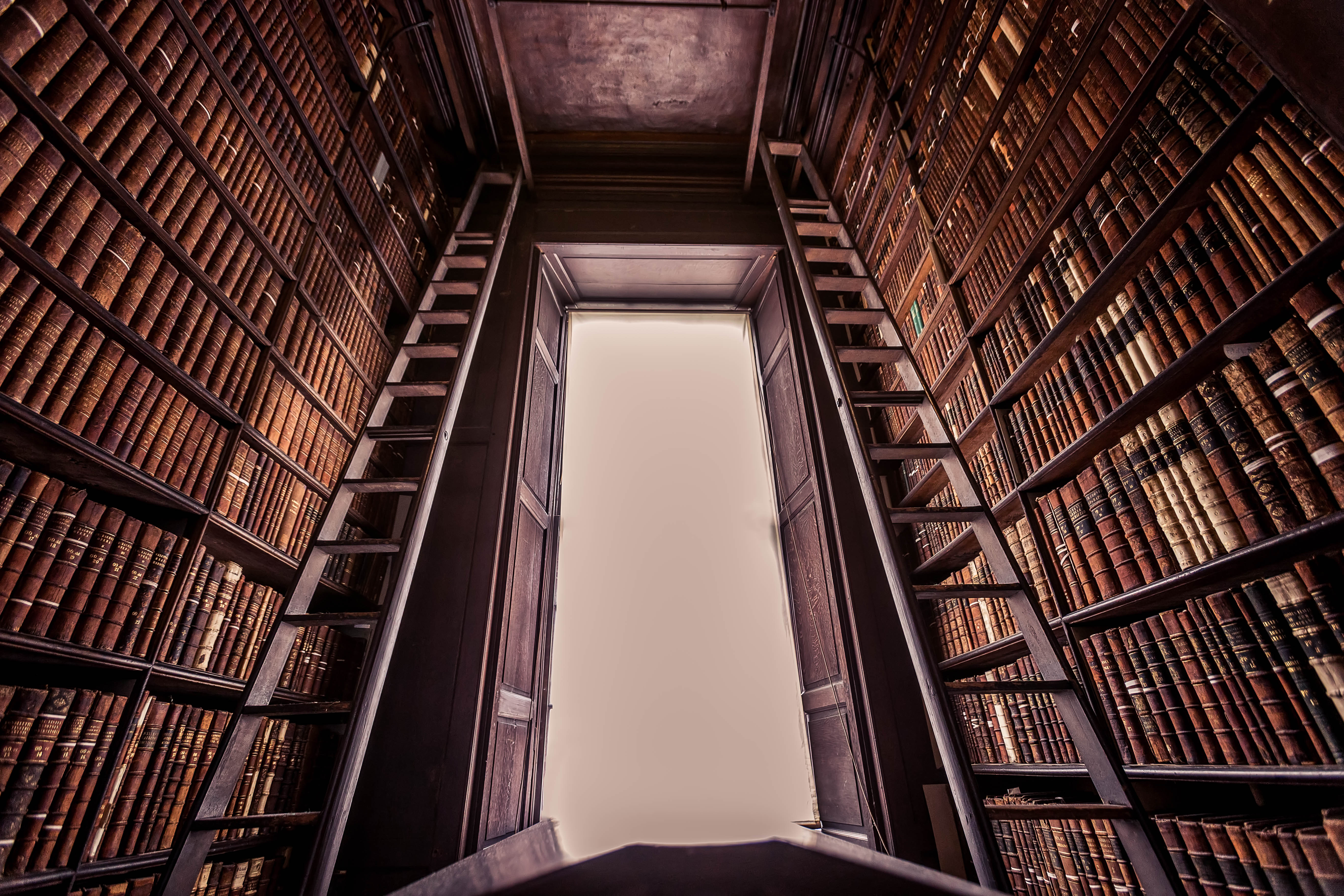
Interior of the Old Library

In April 1900, Queen Victoria visited College Green in Dublin. Women were admitted to Trinity College as full members for the first time in 1904. From 1904 to 1907, women from Oxford and Cambridge, who were admitted but not granted degrees, came to Trinity College to receive their ad eundem degree; they were known as Steamboat ladies and the fees they paid helped to fund Trinity Hall.

In 1907, the Chief Secretary for Ireland proposed the reconstitution of the University of Dublin. Under which the Queen's Colleges at Belfast, Cork and Galway and a new college for Roman Catholics were also to be included. A "Dublin University Defence Committee" was created and successfully campaigned against any change to the status quo. The Irish Catholic bishops also declined to give support to the proposal as Catholic students would be attracted into an atmosphere inimical to their religious faith. Ultimately this episode led to the creation of the National University of Ireland.

From 1910 to 1922, Trinity operated the Dublin University Officers' Training Corps to train cadets for the British Army. During the 1916 Easter Rising, rebels targeted Trinity, which was successfully defended by over 100 cadets led by Captain Ernest Alton and fourteen Dominion troops who were on leave until British reinforcements arrived on Wednesday. Following the Rising, the Dublin University MP, Sir Edward Carson, offered a silver cup to the Dublin UOTC in thanks, which the university holds in trust. Local businessmen formed a commemorative committee and raised £700 for two large silver cups and smaller replicas for all members of the UOTC who participated in the defence of the university.

From July 1917 to March 1918, the Irish Convention met in the college in an attempt to address the political aftermath of the Easter Rising. Subsequently, following the failure of the convention to reach "substantial agreement", the Irish Free State was set up in 1922. In the post-independence period, Trinity College suffered from a cool relationship with the new state. On 3 May 1955, the provost, A.J. McConnell, wrote in the Irish Times that certain state-funded County Council scholarships excluded Trinity College from the list of approved institutions. This, he suggested, amounted to religious discrimination, which was forbidden by the Constitution.

During the early 20th century, the students and faculty of the university also participated in the First World War, in particular during the Gallipoli campaign.

It has also been said of the period before Ireland left the Commonwealth that, "The overwhelming majority of the undergraduates were ex-unionists or, if from Northern Ireland, unionists. Loyalty to the Crown was instinctive and they were proud to be British subjects and Commonwealth citizens", and that "The College still clung, so far as circumstances permitted, to its pre-Treaty loyalties, symbolized by the flying of the Union Jack on suitable occasions and a universal wearing of poppies on Armistice Day, the chapel being packed for the two minutes' silence followed by a lusty rendering of 'God Save the King...". "But by the close of the 1960s... Trinity, with the overwhelming majority of its undergraduate population coming from the Republic, to a great extent conformed to local patterns".

The School of Commerce was established in 1925, and the School of Social Studies in 1934. Also in 1934, the first female professor was appointed.

Young men may loot, perjure and shoot
And even have carnal knowledge.
But however depraved, their souls will be saved
If they don't go to Trinity College.

— verse popular in the 1950s, at the height of Archbishop McQuaid's efforts

In 1944, the Archbishop of Dublin John Charles McQuaid required Catholics in the Dublin archdiocese to obtain a special dispensation before entering the university, under threat of automatic excommunication. The ban was extended nationally at the Plenary Synod of Maynooth in August 1956. Despite this sectarianism, 1958 saw the first Catholic reach the Board of Trinity as a Senior fellow.

In 1962 the School of Commerce and the School of Social Studies amalgamated to form the School of Business and Social Studies. In 1969 several schools and departments were grouped into Faculties as follows: Arts (Humanities and Letters); Business, Economic and Social Studies; Engineering and Systems Sciences; Health Sciences (since October 1977 all undergraduate teaching in dental science in the Dublin area has been in Trinity College); and Science.

In the late 1960s, there was a proposal for University College Dublin, of the National University of Ireland, to become a constituent college of a newly reconstituted University of Dublin. This plan, suggested by Brian Lenihan and Donogh O'Malley, was dropped after officials of both universities opposed it.

In 1970 the Catholic Church lifted its ban on Catholics attending the college without special dispensation. At the same time, Trinity College authorities invited the appointment of a Catholic chaplain to be based in the college. There are now two such Catholic chaplains.

From 1975, the Colleges of Technology that later formed the Dublin Institute of Technology had their degrees conferred by the University of Dublin. This arrangement was discontinued in 1998 when the DIT obtained degree-granting powers of its own.

The School of Pharmacy was established in 1977, and around the same time, the Faculty of Veterinary Medicine was transferred to University College Dublin in exchange for its Dental School. Student numbers increased sharply during the 1980s and 1990s, with total enrollment more than doubling, leading to pressure on resources and a subsequent investment programme. In 1991, Thomas Noel Mitchell became the first Roman Catholic elected Provost of Trinity College.

=== 21st century ===
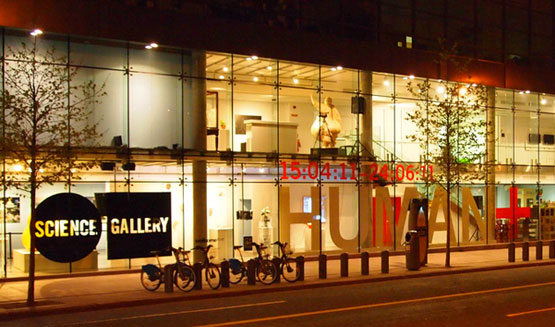
Science Gallery, opened in 2008

At the beginning of the new century, it embarked on a radical overhaul of academic structures to reallocate funds and reduce administration costs, resulting in, for instance, the reduction from six to five to eventually three faculties under a subsequent restructuring. The ten-year strategic plan prioritises four research themes with which the college seeks to compete for funding at the global level. Comparative funding statistics reviewing the difference in departmental unit costs and overall costs before and after this restructuring are not apparent.

The Hamilton Mathematics Institute in Trinity College, named in honour of William Rowan Hamilton, was launched in 2005 and aims to improve the international profile of Irish mathematics, to raise public awareness of mathematics and to support local mathematical research through workshops, conferences and a visitor programme.

In 2021, Linda Doyle was elected the first woman Provost, succeeding Patrick Prendergast.

In 2024, students set up an encampment outside the Book of Kells Museum regarding the university's ties to Israel. After five nights of protests, the administration declared that it would not renew its business relationships with Israeli companies, and the last contract expired in March 2025. In June 2025, Trinity College Dublin severed all ties with Israeli universities and companies, becoming the first Irish university to fully divest. This includes ending investments, commercial relations, academic collaborations, and Erasmus+ exchanges. The move followed recommendations from a taskforce setup in response to the encampment. The university had investments in 13 Israeli companies, some linked to illegal settlements. The decision was praised by student leaders and politicians, who called it a model for other institutions to follow.

== Buildings and grounds ==
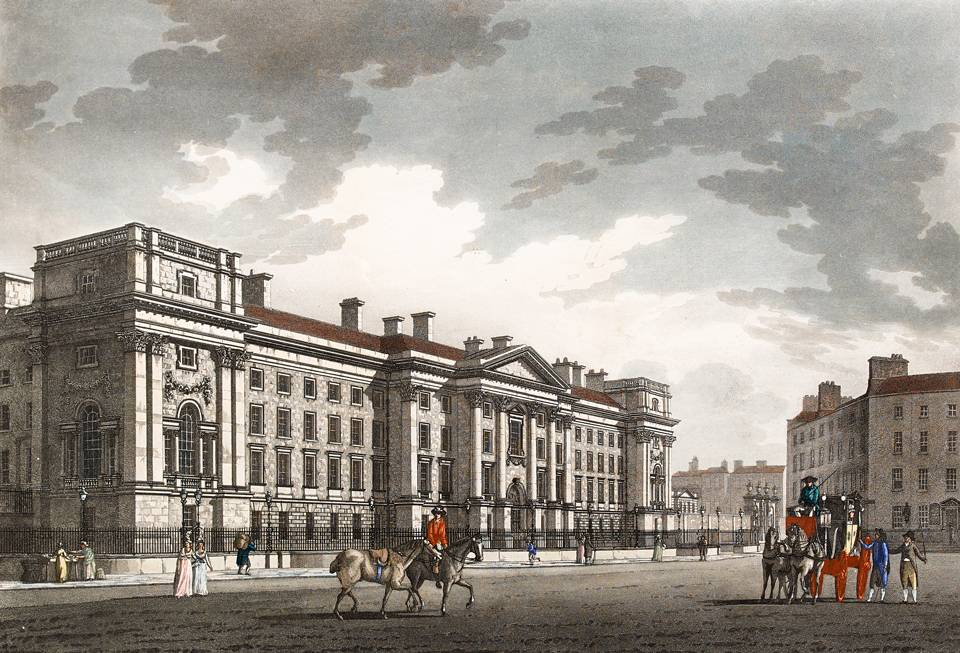
The façade of the main building

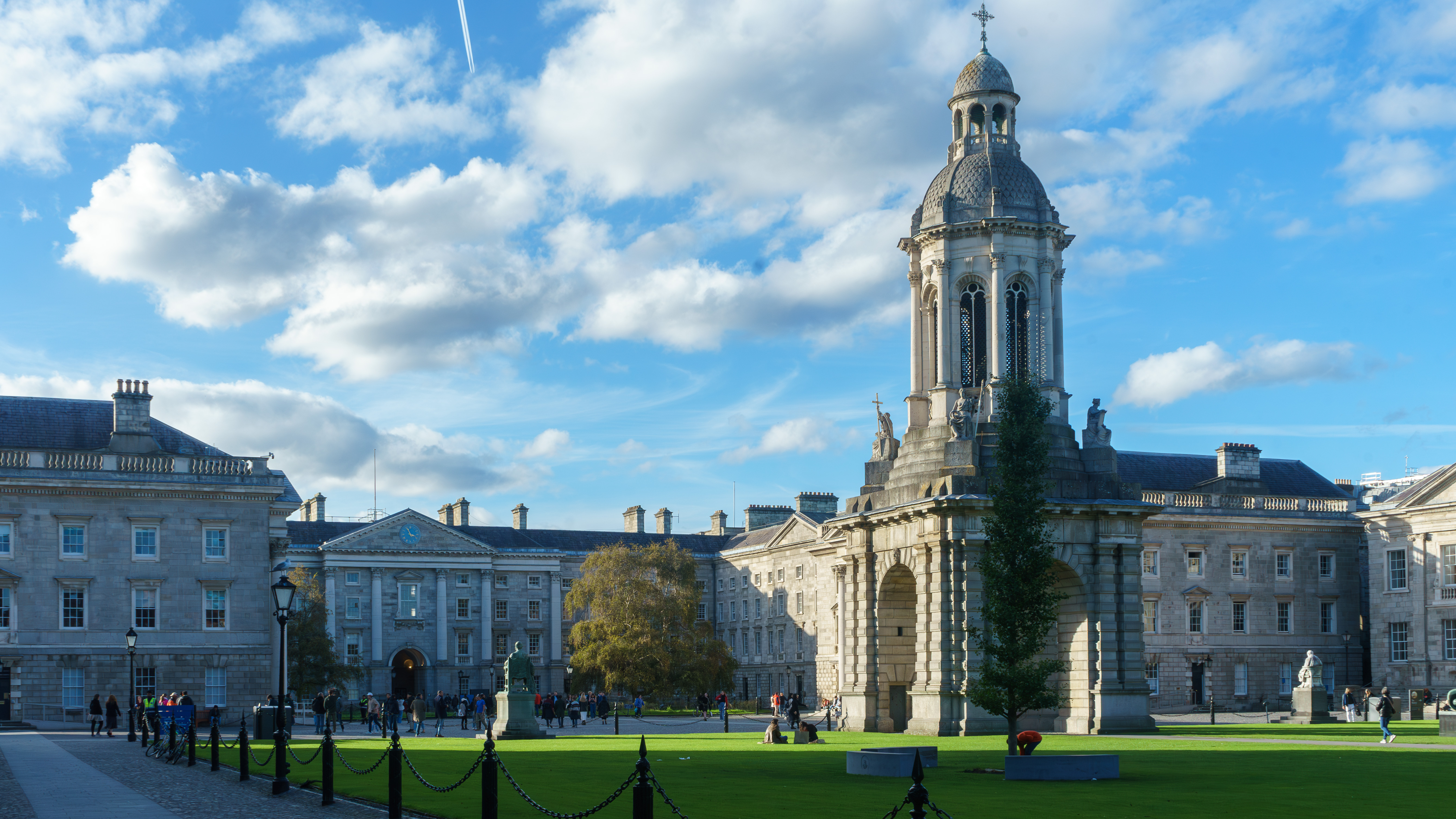
The Parliament Square

The main site of Trinity College has been described as retaining a tranquil collegiate atmosphere despite its location in the centre of a capital city, and despite it being one of Dublin's, and Ireland's, most prominent tourist attractions, with more than 2 million visitors annually. This is, in large part, due to the enclosed and compact design of the college, with the main buildings looking inwards, largely arranged in quadrangles (called squares), and the existence of only a few public entrances. In addition to the main site of the college, Trinity owns a number of buildings nearby in central Dublin, as well as an enterprise centre near Ringsend and a botanic garden in Dartry. The college has been used as a location in numerous movies and novels.

Patrick Wyse Jackson, curator of the Geological Museum at Trinity, assessed the architectural merits of the entrance and entry buildings in 1993:

"The imposing entrance to Trinity College, consisting of a central area flanked by two square pavilions, was built in the 1750s of Leinster Granite from Golden Hill, Co Wicklow, and Portland Stone was used for the architraves, swags, and Corinthian pilasters and half-columns... The masonry cost £27,000. Between 1990 and 1992 the central portion of the building was cleaned. Passing through the gateway one walks over a wooden floor of interlocking hexagonal setts (similar in pattern to the basaltic Giant's Causeway), and into Parliament Square, which is dominated by the identical Corinthian fronts, in Leinster Granite and Portland Stone, of the Chapel on the left and the Examination Hall on the right. Further into the square on the left-hand side is the Dining Hall, restored after a fire in 1984. For reasons unknown, until 1870 the clock in the portico was set fifteen minutes after Dublin time."

The hexagonal setts are made of oak, chosen for its noise absorption qualities, and was a common form of paving in the forecourts of hospitals.

=== Main site ===
The main college grounds are approximately 190,000 m^{2} (47 acres), including the Trinity College Enterprise Centre some distance away, and buildings provide around 200,000 m^{2} of floor space, ranging from works of older architecture to more modern buildings. The college's main entrance is on College Green, and its grounds are bounded by Nassau and Pearse Streets. The college is bisected by College Park, which has both a cricket and a rugby pitch.

The college's western side is older, featuring the Campanile, as well as many fine buildings, including the Chapel and Examination Hall (designed by Sir William Chambers), Graduates Memorial Building, Museum Building, and The Rubrics (the sole surviving section of the original 17th-century quadrangle), all spread across the college's five squares. An organ case held within the Examination Hall was noted by Dublin Tourism to be the oldest existing Irish made organ case, reputed to have been built in 1684 by Lancelot Pearse. The gilt oak chandelier which hangs in the Examination Hall was taken from the old Irish House of Commons in nearby College Green.

The Provost's House sits a little way up from the College Front Gate such that the House is actually on Grafton Street, one of the two principal shopping streets in the city, while its garden faces into the college. The Douglas Hyde Gallery, a contemporary art gallery, is in the college, as is the Samuel Beckett Theatre. It hosts national and international performances and is used by the Dublin International Theatre Festival, the Dublin Dance Festival, and The Fringe Festival, among others. During the academic term, it is predominantly used as a teaching and performance space for drama students and staff.

The college's eastern side is occupied by science buildings, most of which are modern developments, arranged in three rows instead of quadrangles. In 2010, Forbes ranked it one of the 15 most beautiful college grounds in the world.

==== Chapel ====
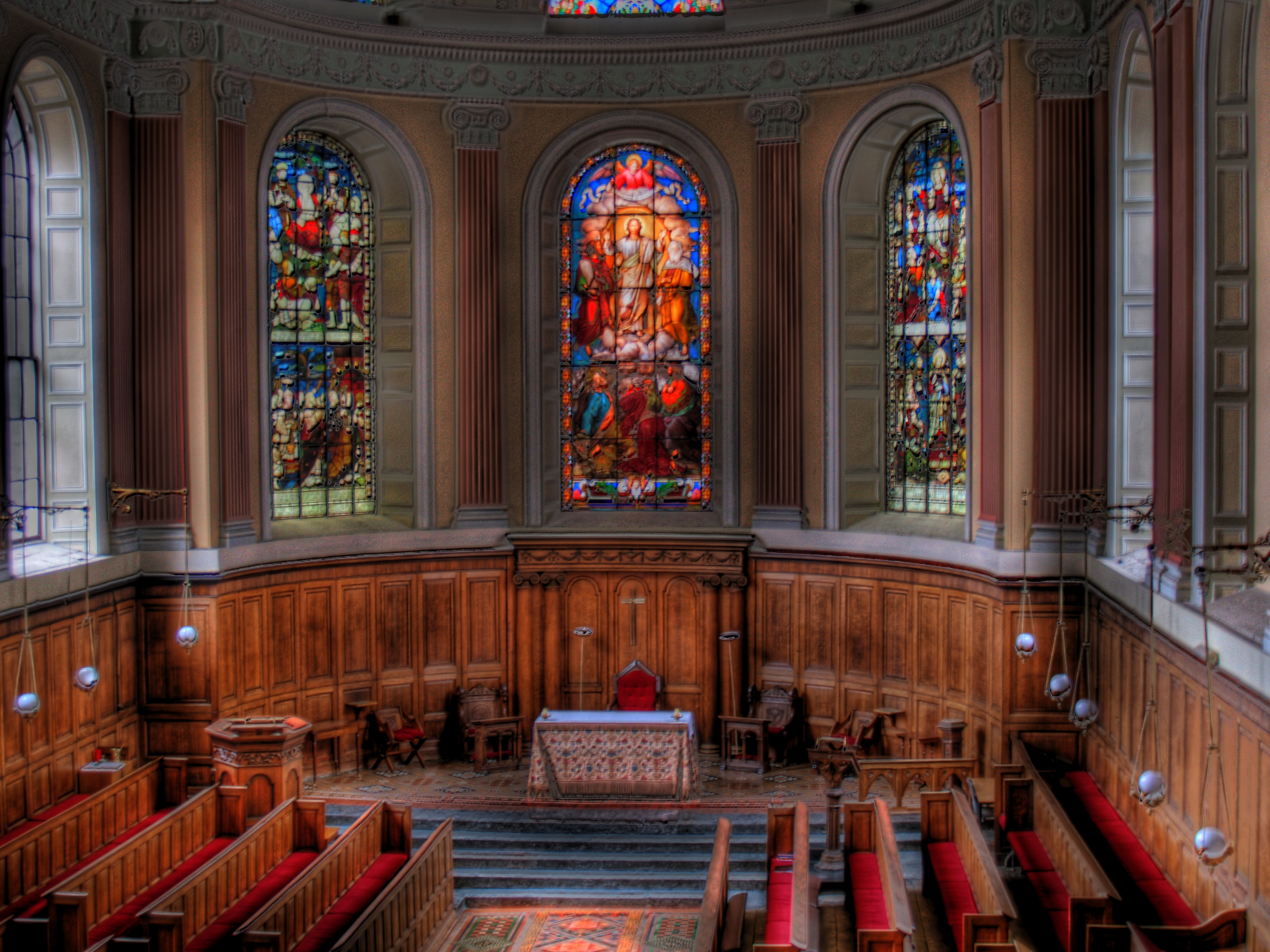
Interior of Trinity College Chapel

The current chapel was completed in 1798, and was designed by George III's architect, Sir William Chambers, who also designed the public theatre opposite the chapel on Parliament Square. Reflecting the college's Anglican heritage, there are daily services of Morning prayer, weekly services of Evensong, and Holy Communion is celebrated on Tuesdays and Sundays. It is no longer compulsory for students to attend these.

The chapel has been ecumenical since 1970, and is now also used daily in the celebration of Mass for the college's Roman Catholic members. According to a Dublin Tourism brochure in the late 1990s, it was the "only chapel in the country which is shared by all the Christian denominations". In addition to the Anglican chaplain, who is known as the Dean of Residence, there are two Roman Catholic chaplains and one Methodist chaplain. Ecumenical events are often held in the chapel, such as the annual carol service and the service of thanksgiving on Trinity Monday.

Behind the chapel is a small cemetery named Challenor's Corner, which is reserved for the burial of Provosts of the college. The space is named after Luke Challenor, who was buried there in 1613.

==== Library ====
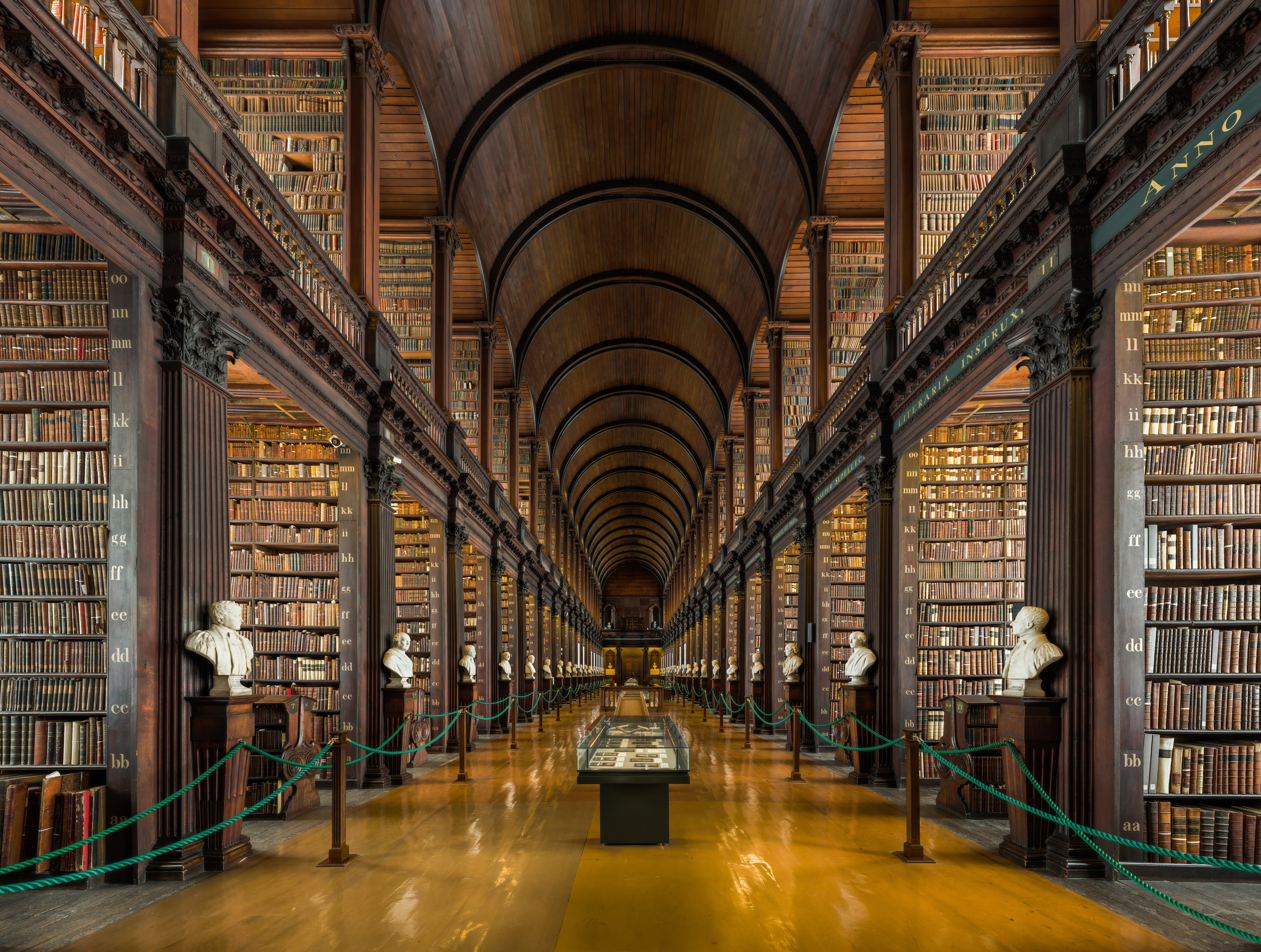
The Long Room of the Old Library

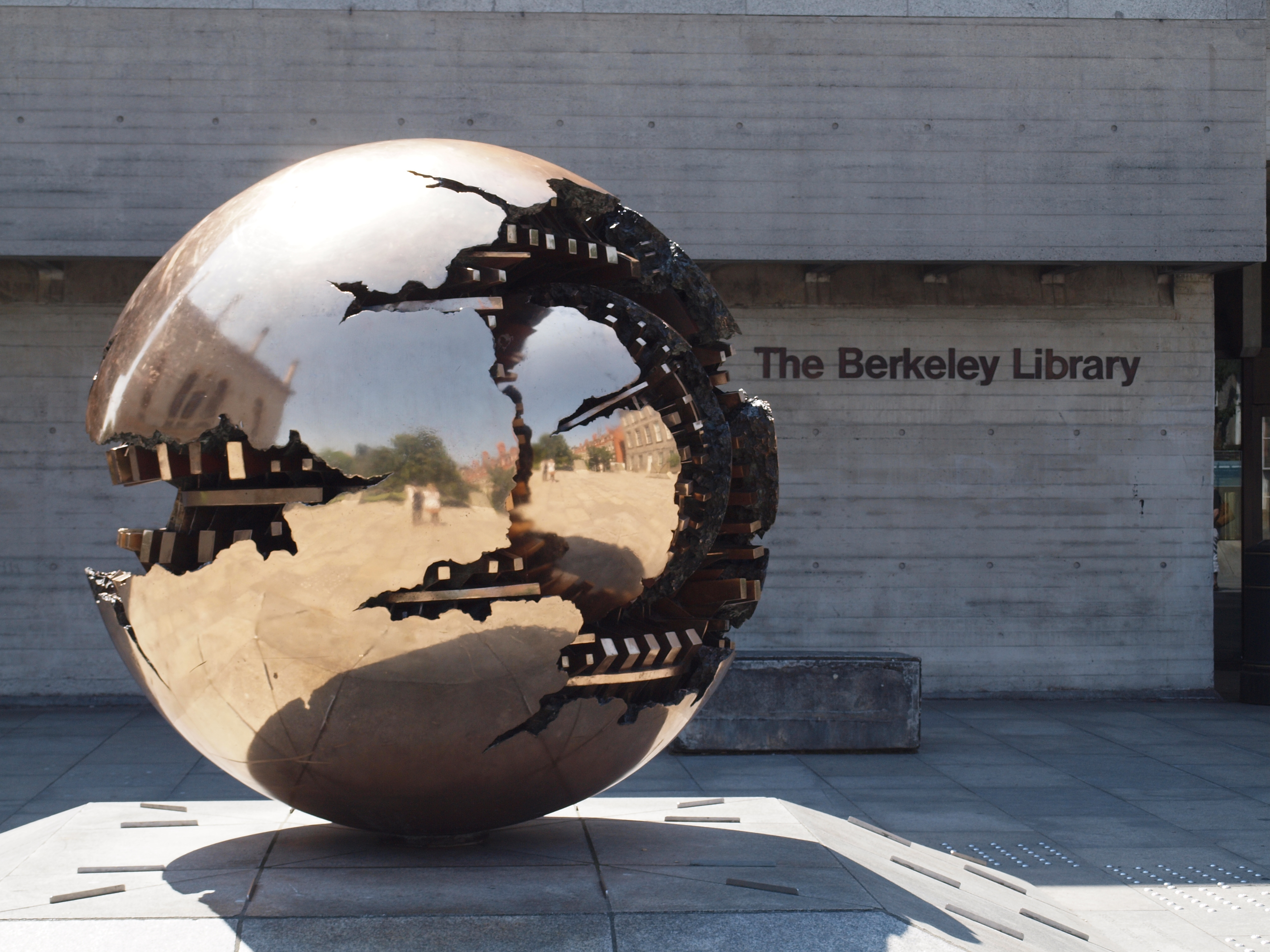
Arnaldo Pomodoro's Sphere Within Sphere sculpture stands outside the Eavan Boland Library.

The Library of Trinity College is Ireland's largest research library. As a result of its historic standing, Trinity College Library Dublin is a legal deposit library, now under the Copyright and Related Rights Act 2000 in Irish law and the Legal Deposit Libraries Act 2003 in UK law. The college is therefore legally entitled to a copy of every book published in Great Britain and Ireland, and consequently receives over 100,000 new items every year. The library contains about five million books, including 30,000 current serials and significant collections of manuscripts, maps, and printed music. Three million books are held in the book depository, known as the "Stacks", in Santry, from which requests are retrieved twice daily.

The Library proper comprises several buildings in the college. The original (Old) Library is Thomas Burgh's masterpiece. A huge building, it originally towered over the university and the city after its completion. Even today, surrounded by similarly scaled buildings, it is imposing and dominates the view of the university from Nassau Street. It was founded with the college and first endowed by James Ussher (1625–56), Archbishop of Armagh, who endowed his own valuable library, comprising several thousand printed books and manuscripts, to the college. The Book of Kells is by far the Library's most famous book and is in the Old Library, along with the Book of Durrow, the Book of Howth and other ancient texts. Also incorporating the Long Room, the Old Library receives over 900,000 visitors per year, making it Dublin's second-most visited tourist destination. In the 18th century, the college received the Trinity College or "Brian Boru" harp, one of the three surviving medieval Gaelic harps, and a national symbol of Ireland, now housed in the library.

The buildings known as the college's BLU (Boland Lecky Ussher) Arts library complex consist of the Eavan Boland Library (named for the Irish poet Eavan Boland) in Fellow's square, built in 1956 as the Berkeley Library; the Lecky Library (named for the historian William Edward Hartpole Lecky), attached to the Arts building; and the Ussher Library (named for the theologian James Ussher), opened in 2003, overlooking College Park and housing the Glucksman Map Library. The Glucksman Library contains half a million printed maps, the largest collection of cartographic materials in Ireland. This includes the first Ordnance Surveys of Ireland, conducted in the early 19th century.

The Berkeley Library, named for the philosopher George Berkeley, was renamed after attention was brought to Berkeley's history as a slave trader, leading to a petition for renaming from the Students Union. In August 2022, incoming Student Union President Gabi Fullam announced that the Students Union would refer to the library as the "X Library" in all official communications pending renaming. In April 2023, Trinity College announced that it would dename the Berkeley Library, and in October 2024 it was renamed the Eavan Boland Library after the poet Eavan Boland. This makes it the first building named after any woman on Trinity’s city centre site. Previous to the renaming, Trinity asked members of the public to vote on a figure for the library to named in honour of. Wolfe Tone won the poll with 31% of the vote, while Boland netted 7%. Trinity subsequently chose to ignore the vote.

The Library also includes the William Hamilton Science and Engineering Library and the John Stearne Medical Library, housed at St James's Hospital.

==== Business school ====
The Trinity College Business School's building is in an €80 million construction project and was inaugurated on 23 May 2019 by the Taoiseach, Leo Varadkar, an alumnus of Trinity College School of Medicine. The six-storey building, adjoining the Naughton Institute on the college's Pearse Street side, includes an Innovation and Entrepreneurial hub, a 600-seat auditorium, "smart classrooms" with digital technology, and an "executive education centre". The near-zero energy building provides a link between the city and the main University grounds.

=== Other facilities ===
Trinity also incorporates a number of buildings and facilities spread throughout the city, from the politics and sociology departments on Dame Street to the Faculty of Health Sciences buildings, located at St. James's Hospital and Tallaght University Hospital. The Trinity Centre at St James's Hospital incorporates additional teaching rooms, as well as the Institute of Molecular Medicine and John Durkan Leukaemia Institute.

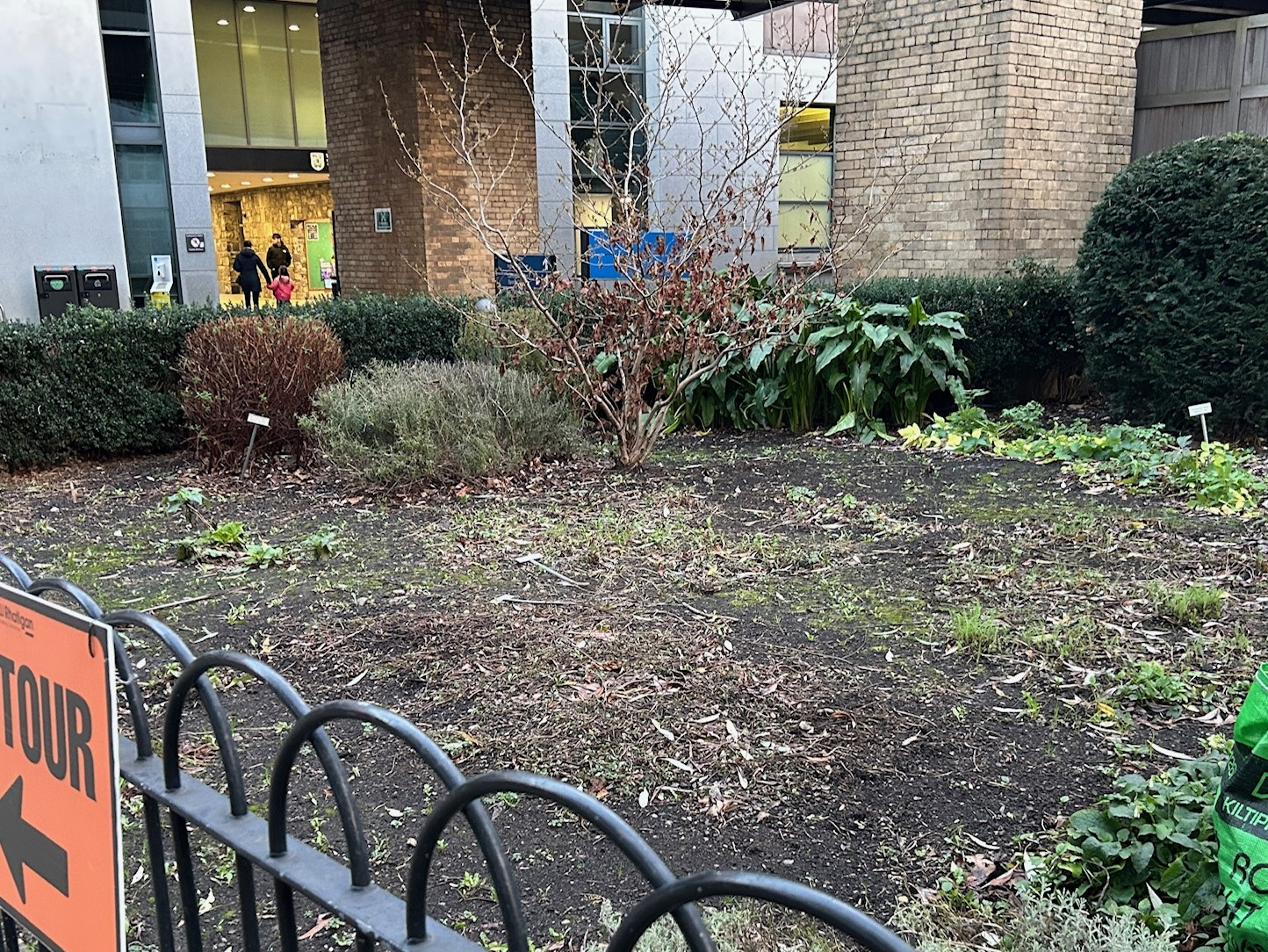
The modern Herb or Physic Garden of TCD, off Pearse St., made in 2011

The college's botanic garden, which developed from a herb garden on the main site, is located in Dartry, around four kilometres south of the main site, and it also owns a large set of residences on the Dartry Road, in Rathmines, called Trinity Hall. (Note: Trinity Hall, which houses 1,100 students, of whom the majority are first years.) A new physic or herb garden was opened in 2011, and there are also small gardens in the space known as Botany Bay and at the rear of the Provost's House.

In November 2018, Trinity announced plans, estimated at €230 million, to develop university research facilities on a site in Grand Canal Dock as part of an "Innovation District" for the area. These plans were later scaled back.

In addition to College Park, Botany Bay and other on-site facilities, the college also owns sports grounds in Santry and Crumlin, and a boathouse in Islandbridge.

== Charter ==
Trinity is governed in accordance with amended versions of the Letters Patent of Elizabeth I, as well as various other statutes. On several occasions, the founding Letters Patent were amended by later monarchs, such as James I in 1613, and most notably Charles I in 1637 – the latter increased the number of fellows from seven to 16, established the Board – initially consisting of the Provost and the seven senior Fellows – and reduced the panel of Visitors in size. Further major changes were made in the reign of Queen Victoria, and more again by the Oireachtas, including in 2000.

== Organisation ==
The college, officially incorporated as The Provost, Fellows and Scholars of the College of the Holy and Undivided Trinity of Queen Elizabeth near Dublin, is headed by the Provost. Linda Doyle has been Provost since August 2021.

The terms "University of Dublin" and "Trinity College" are generally considered synonymous for all practical purposes. Trinity was originally founded using the models of the University of Oxford and University of Cambridge in England, both of which are collegiate universities that each comprise several quasi-independent colleges. In one sense, the University of Dublin exists only as a degree-granting institution, with the college providing the education and research; Trinity College was the only college to ever be established within the university.

=== Governance ===
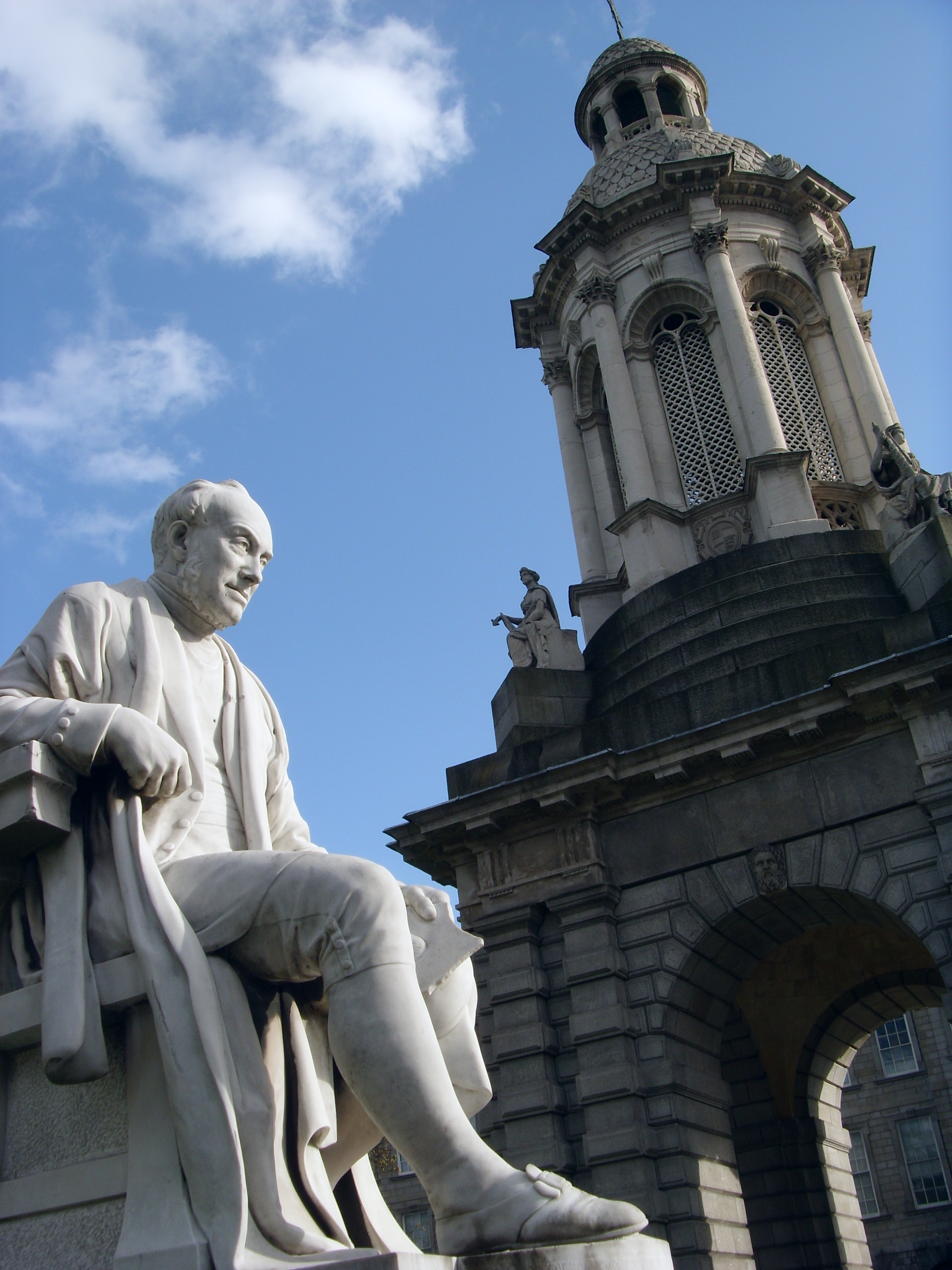
Statue of former Provost George Salmon (by John Hughes) and the Campanile, both in Parliament Square

The body corporate of the college consists of the provost, fellows and scholars. The college is governed according to its statutes, which are, in effect, the College Constitution. Statutes are of two kinds, those which originally could only be amended by Royal Charter or Royal Letters Patent, and which now can only be changed by an Act of the Oireachtas, and those which can be changed by the board but only with the Fellows' consent.

When a change requires parliamentary legislation, the customary procedure is that the Board requests the change by applying for a Private Bill. For this, the whole Body Corporate's consent is needed, with Scholars voting alongside Fellows. An example of a change that requires parliamentary legislation is an alteration to the composition of the Board. This last happened when the governance of the college and university was revised and restated by an Act of the Oireachtas in 2000.

==== Provost ====
The Provost serves a ten-year term and is elected by a body of electors consisting essentially of all full-time academic staff and a very small number of students. Originally the Provost was appointed for life. While the Provost was elected by the Fellows at the start, the appointment soon became a Crown one, reflecting the growing importance of the college and of the office of provost, which became both prestigious and well-paid. But as time passed, it became customary that the appointments were only made after taking soundings of college opinion, which meant mostly the views of the Board.

With the establishment of the Free State in 1922, the power of appointment were passed to the Irish Government. It was agreed that when a vacancy occurred the college would provide a list of three candidates to the Government, from which the choice would be made. The college was allowed to rank the candidates in order of preference, and in practice, the most preferred candidate was always appointed. Now the Provost, while still formally appointed by the Government, is elected by staff plus student representatives, who gather in an electoral meeting and vote by exhaustive ballot until a candidate obtains an absolute majority; the process takes a day.

The Provost takes precedence over everyone else in the college, acts as the chief executive and accounting officer and chairs the board and council. The Provost also enjoys a special status in the University of Dublin.

==== Fellows and Scholars ====
Fellows and Scholars are elected by the board. Fellows were once elected for life on the basis of a competitive examination. The number of Fellows was fixed and a competition to fill a vacancy would occur on the death or resignation of a Fellow. Originally all the teaching was carried out by the Fellows. Fellows are now elected from among current college academics and serve until reaching retirement age, and there is no formal limit on their number.

Only a minority of academic staff are Fellows. Election to Fellowship is recognition for staff that they have excelled in their field and amounts to a promotion for those receiving it. Any person appointed to a professorship who is not already a Fellow is elected a Fellow at the next opportunity.

Scholars continue to be selected by competitive examination from the Undergraduate body. The Scholarship examinations are now set separately for different undergraduate courses (so there is a Scholarship examination in history, or in mathematics, engineering, and so forth). The Scholarship examination is taken in the second year of a four-year degree course (though, in special circumstances, such as illness, bereavement, or studying abroad during the second year, permission may be given to sit the examination in the third year).

In theory, students can sit the examination in any subject, not just the one they are studying. They hold their Scholarship until they are of "MA standing" – that is, three years after obtaining the BA degree. Most are thus Scholars for five years.

Fellows are entitled to residence in the college free of charge; most do not exercise this right in practice, with the legal requirement to provide accommodation to them fulfilled by providing an office. Scholars are also entitled to residence in the college free of charge; they also receive an allowance and have the fees paid for courses they take within the college.

Due to the pressure on college accommodation, Scholars are no longer entitled, as they once were, to free rooms for the full duration of their Scholarship should they cease to be students. Fellows and Scholars are also entitled to one free meal a day, usually in the evening ("Commons"). Scholars also retain the right to free meals for the full duration of their Scholarship even after graduation, and ceasing to be students, should they choose to exercise it.

==== Board ====
Aside from the Provost, Fellows and Scholars, Trinity College has a Board (dating from 1637), which carries out general governance. Originally the Board consisted of the Provost and Senior Fellows only. There were seven Senior Fellows, defined as those seven fellows that had served longest, Fellowship at that time being for life, unless resigned.

Over the years, a representational element was added, for example by having elected representatives of the Junior Fellows and of those professors who were not Fellows, with the last revision before Irish Independence being made by Royal Letters Patent in 1911. At that time there were, as well as the Senior Fellows, two elected representatives of those professors who were not Fellows and elected representatives of the Junior Fellows. Over the years, while formal revision did not take place, partly due to the complexity of the process, a number of additional representatives were added to the Board but as "observers" and not full voting members. These included representatives of academic staff who were not Fellows, and representatives of students.

In practice, all attending the Board meetings were treated as equals, with votes, while not common, were taken by a show of hands. But it remained the case that legally only the full members of the Board could have their votes recorded and it was mere convention that they always ratified the decision taken by the show of hands.

The governance of Trinity College was next formally changed in 2000, by the Oireachtas, in The Trinity College, Dublin (Charters and Letters Patent Amendment) Act 2000, legislation proposed by the Board of the college and approved by the Body Corporate. This was introduced separately from the Universities Act 1997.

It states that the Board shall comprise

- The Provost, Vice-Provost/Chief Academic Officer, Senior Lecturer, Registrar and Bursar;
- Six Fellows;
- Five members of the academic staff who are not Fellows, at least three of whom must be of a rank not higher than senior lecturer;
- Two members of the academic staff of the rank of professor;
- Three members of the non-academic staff;
- Four students of the college, at least one of whom shall be a post-graduate student;
- One member, not an employee or student of the college, chosen by a Board committee from nominations made by organisations "representative of such business or professional interest as the Board considers appropriate";
- One member nominated by the Minister for Education following consultation with the Provost.

==== Council ====
A Council, dating from 1874, oversees academic matters. All decisions of the Council require the approval of the Board, but if the decision in question does not require a new expenditure, the approval is normally formal, without debate.

The council had a significant number of elected representatives from the start, and was also larger than the Board, which at that time continued to consist of the provost and seven Senior Fellows only. The council is the formal body which makes academic staff appointments, always, in practice on the recommendation of appointments panels which have themselves been appointed by the council.

An illustration of the relationship between the Board and the council is a decision to create a new professorial chair. As this involves paying a salary, the initial decision to create the chair is made by the council, but the decision to make provision for the salary is made by the Board; consequently, the Board might overrule or defer a Council decision on grounds of cost.

==== Senate ====
Arms of the University of Dublin

The University of Dublin was modelled on University of Oxford and University of Cambridge in the form of a collegiate university, Trinity College being the name given by the Queen as the mater universitatis ("mother of the university").

As no other college was ever established, the college is the university's sole constituent college, and so "Trinity College" and the "University of Dublin" are for most purposes synonymous. Still, the statutes of the university and the college grant the university separate corporate legal rights to own property and borrow money and employ staff.

Moreover, while the Board of the college has the sole power to propose amendments to the statutes of the university and college, amendments to the university statutes require the consent of the Senate of the university. Consequently, in theory, the Senate can overrule the Board, but only in very limited and particular circumstances. However, it is also the case that the university cannot act independently of the initiative of the Board of Trinity College. The most common example of when the two bodies must collaborate is when a decision is made to establish a new degree.

All matters relating to syllabus, examination and teaching are for the college to determine, but actual clearance for the award of the degree is a matter for the university. In the same way, when an individual is awarded an Honorary Degree, the proposal for the award is made by the Board of Trinity College, but this is subject to agreement by a vote of the Senate of Dublin University. All graduates of the university who have at least a master's degree are eligible to be members of the Senate, but in practice, only a few hundred are, with a large proportion being current members of the staff of Trinity College.

==== Visitors ====
The college also has an oversight structure of two Visitors: the Chancellor of the university, who is elected by the Senate, and the judicial Visitor, who is appointed by the Irish Government from a list of two names submitted by the Senate of the university. The current judicial Visitor is Maureen Harding Clark. In the event of a disagreement between the two Visitors, the opinion of the Chancellor prevails.

The Visitors act as a final "court of appeal" within the college, with their modes of appointment giving them the needed independence from the college administration.

=== Academic associations ===
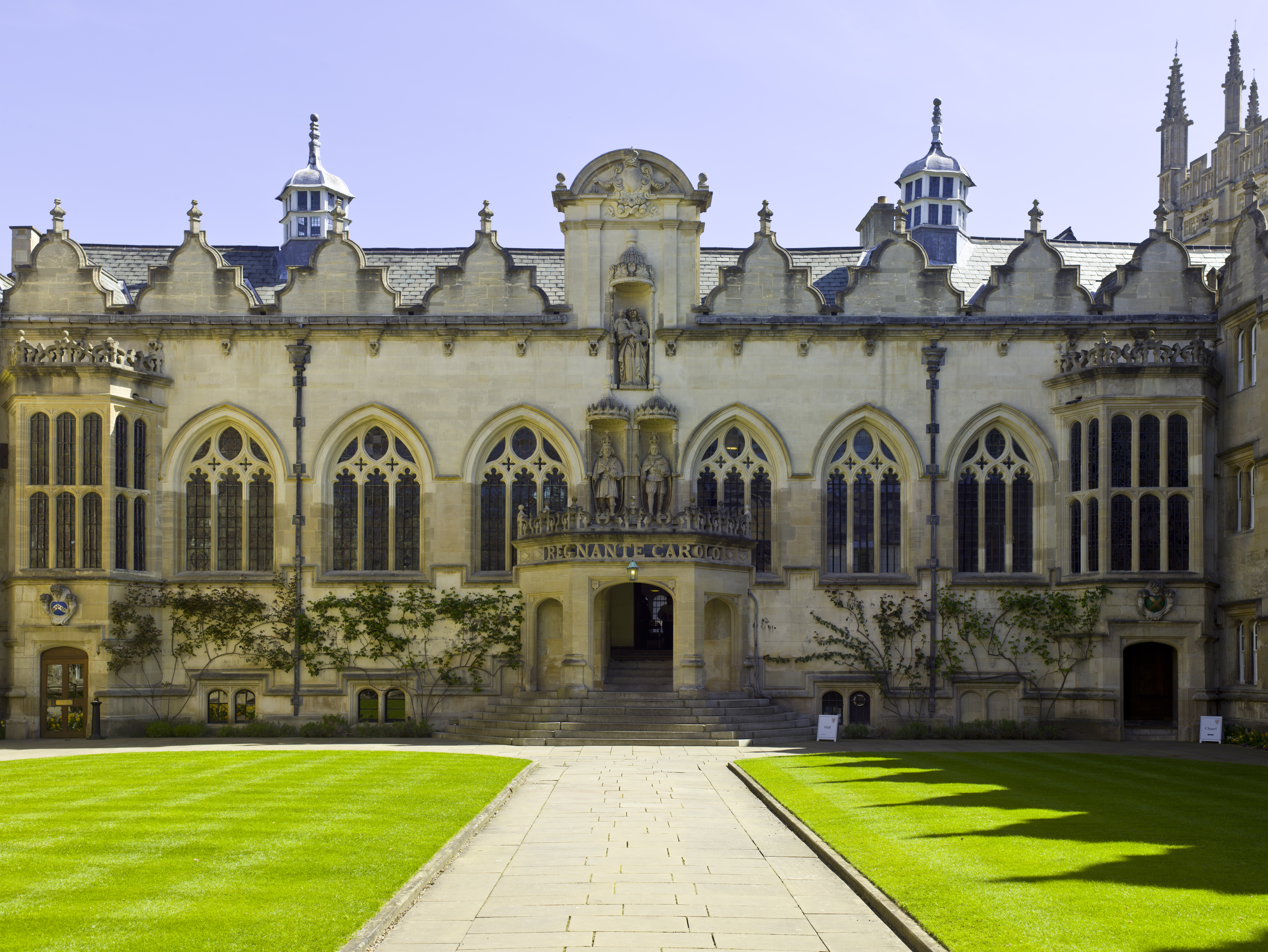
Oriel College, Oxford

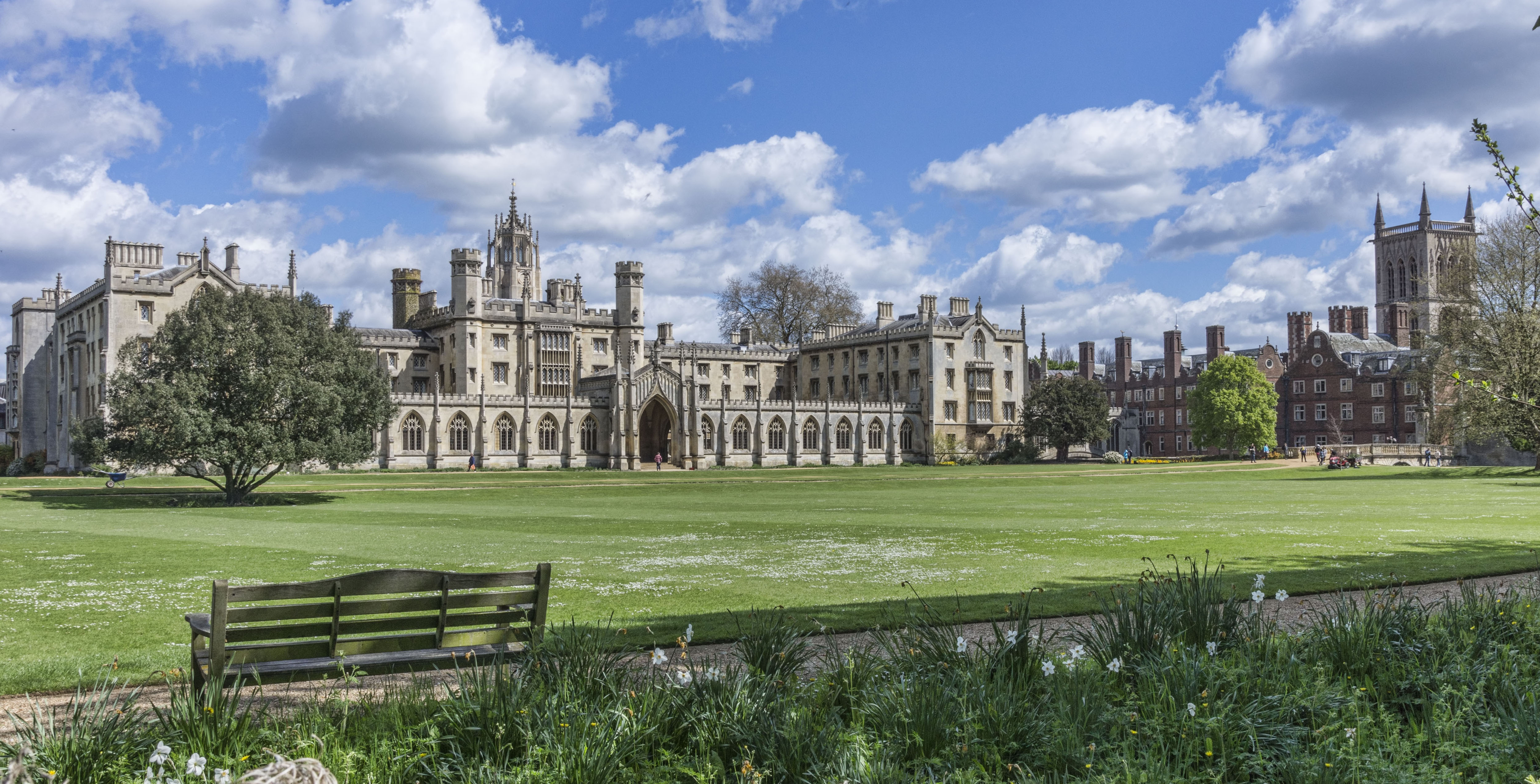
St John's College, Cambridge

Trinity College is a sister college to Oriel College of the University of Oxford and St John's College of the University of Cambridge. In accordance with the formula of ad eundem gradum, a form of recognition that exists among the University of Oxford, the University of Cambridge and the University of Dublin, a graduate of Oxford, Cambridge, or Dublin can be conferred with the equivalent degree at either of the other two universities without further examination, a process referred to as Incorporation.

==== Teaching and affiliated hospitals ====
As of 2021, the teaching and associated hospitals are:

- Tallaght University Hospital
- St. James's Hospital
- St Patrick's University Hospital
- Dublin Dental University Hospital
- Naas General Hospital
- Coombe Women & Infants University Hospital
- Rotunda Hospital
- Royal Victoria Eye and Ear Hospital
- Children's Health Ireland at Crumlin
- Peamount Hospital
- National Rehabilitation Hospital

==== Associated Institutions ====
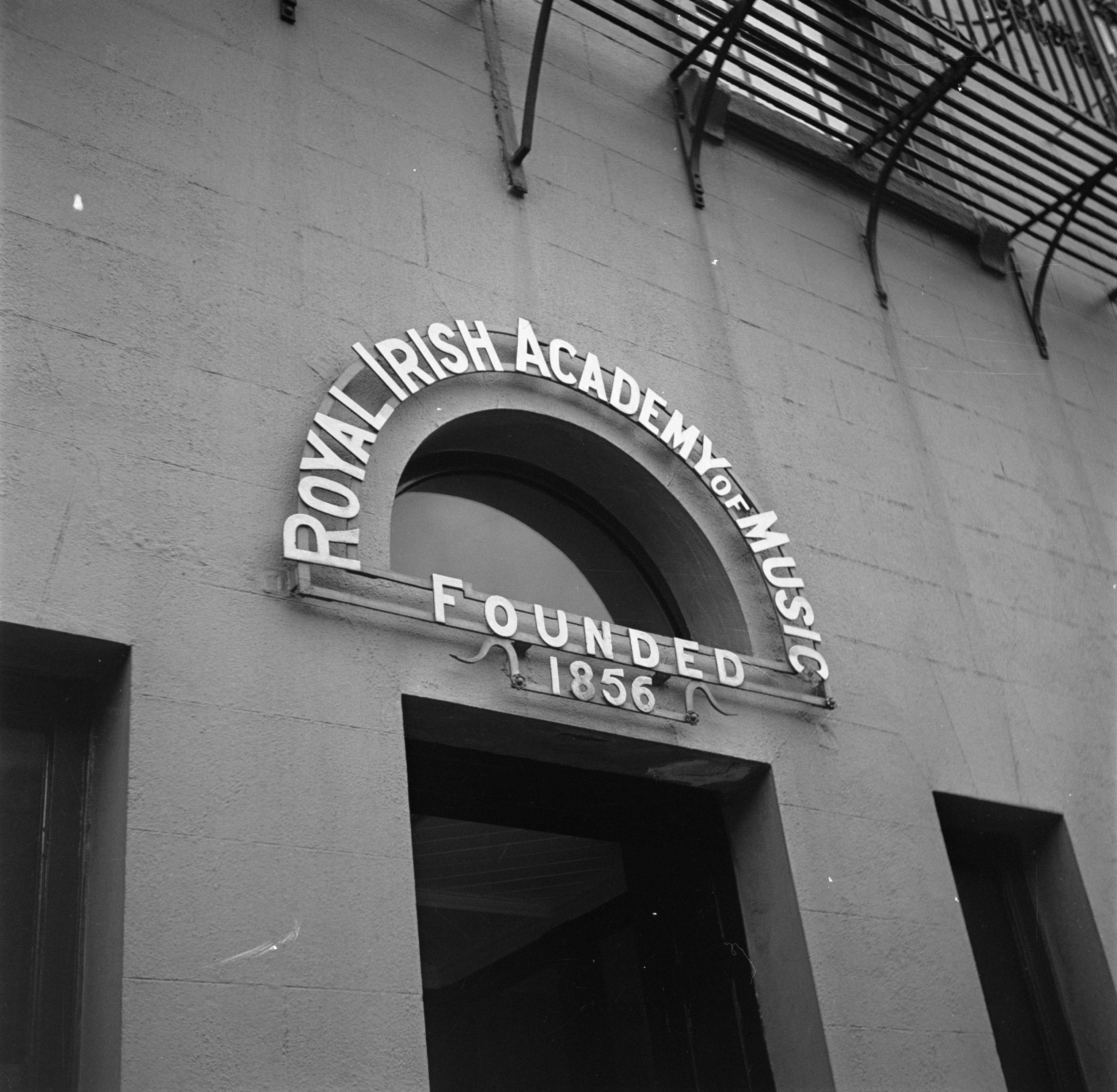
Royal Irish Academy of Music

- Royal Irish Academy of Music
- Marino Institute of Education
- Church of Ireland Theological Institute
- The Lir Academy

The School of Business in association with the Irish Management Institute forms the Trinity-IMI Graduate School of Management, incorporating the faculties of both organisations. Trinity College has also formerly been associated with several other teaching institutions, such as St Catherine's College of Education for Home Economics (now closed), Magee College and Royal Irish Academy of Music, a music conservatoire, and The Lir National Academy of Dramatic Art, the national conservatoire for theatre training actors, technicians, playwrights and designers to a professional and industry standard. The Lir is also advised by the Royal Academy of Dramatic Art in the UK.

=== Parliamentary representation ===
The university has been linked to parliamentary representation since 1613, when James I granted it the right to elect two members of parliament (MPs) to the Irish House of Commons. The franchise was originally restricted to the Provost, Fellows and Scholars of Trinity College. This was expanded in 1832 to include those who had received an MA, and in 1918 all those who had received a degree from the university. This right was extended to elect MPs to the Westminster parliament after the Acts of Union 1800; representatives at Westminster included Edward Gibson, W. E. H. Lecky and Edward Carson.

Since the new Constitution of Ireland in 1937, the university has formed a constituency which elects three senators to Seanad Éireann. Notable representatives have included Noel Browne, Conor Cruise O'Brien and Mary Robinson.

== Academic profile ==
Since considerable academic restructuring in 2008, the college has three academic faculties:

- Arts, Humanities and Social Sciences
- Science, Technology, Engineering, and Mathematics
- Health Sciences

Each faculty is headed by a dean (there is also a Dean of Postgraduate Studies), and faculties are divided into schools, of which there were 24 as of 2021.

=== Academic year ===
The academic year is divided into three terms:

- Michaelmas term lasts from October to December
- Hilary term from January to March
- Trinity term from April to June

Each term is separated by a vacation, and whilst teaching takes place across all three terms in postgraduate courses, for undergraduate programmes, teaching is condensed within the first two terms since 2009, with each term consisting of a 12-week period of teaching known as the Teaching Term. These are followed by three revision weeks and a four-week exam period during the Trinity Term.

Internally at least, the weeks in the term are often referred to by the time elapsed since the start of the teaching Term: thus the first week is called "1st week" or "week 1" and the last is "Week 12" or "12th week".

The first week of Trinity Term (which marks the conclusion of lecturing for that year) is known as Trinity Week; normally preceded by a string of balls, it consists of a week of sporting and academic events. This includes the Trinity Ball and the Trinity Regatta (a premier social event on the Irish rowing calendar held since 1898), the election of Scholars and Fellows, and a college banquet.

=== Second-level programmes ===
Since 2014, Trinity College's science department has established and operated a scheme for second-level students to study science, technology, engineering, and mathematics.

The system, similar to DCU's CTYI programme, encourages academically gifted secondary students with a high aptitude for the STEM subjects, and was named the Walton Club in honour of Ernest Walton, Ireland's first and only Nobel laureate in Physics. The programme was centred upon a pedagogic principle of "developing capacity for learning autonomy".

The educators in the programme are PhD students in the college, who impart an advanced, undergraduate-level curriculum to the students. The club was set up with a specific ethos around the mentoring of STEM subjects, and not as a grinds school. The scheme has been immensely successful and undergone growth in scope and scale year on year. It has also diversified beyond its traditional weekly club structure, running camps during school holidays to offer an opportunity to study STEM to those unable to join the club.

It has also represented the college in many activities, meeting Chris Hadfield and attending the Young Scientist and Technology Exhibition and the Web Summit. Students, or alphas as they are dubbed in honour of the eponymous physicist, develop projects in the club, with innovations pioneered there including a health-focused electroencephalogram. The club was founded by Professors Igor Shvets and Arlene O'Neill of the School of Physics in Trinity College.

=== Undergraduate ===
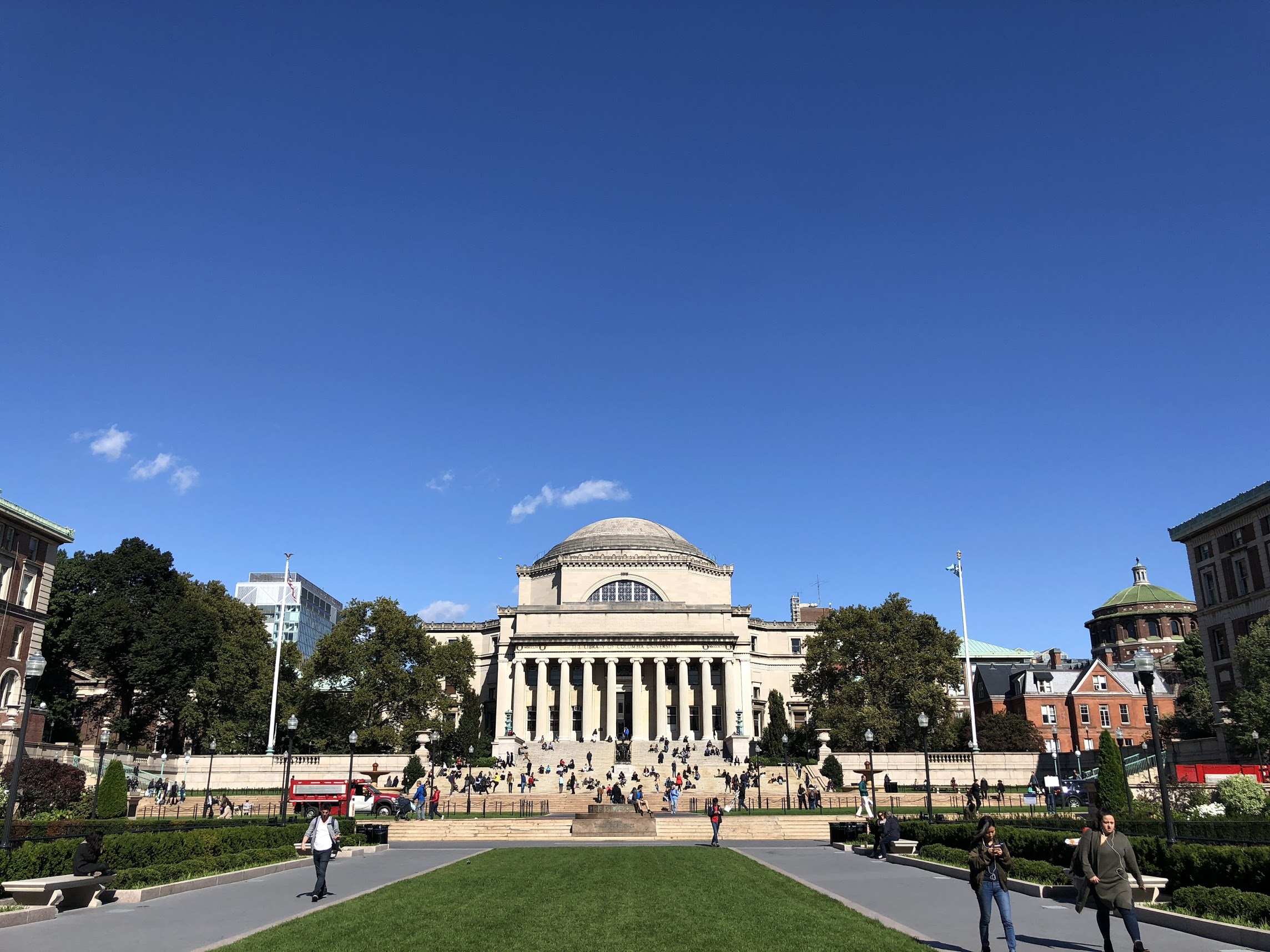
Columbia University, which offers a dual BA

Most undergraduate courses require four years of study. First-year students at the undergraduate level are called Junior Freshmen; second-years, Senior Freshmen; third-years, Junior Sophisters; and fourth-years, Senior Sophisters. Trinity's undergraduate admissions are competitive, with an average acceptance rate of 17%.

After a 2017 proposal by the SU Equality Committee, the Trinity College Board approved a three-year process changing the titles of first and second years to Junior and Senior Fresh.

Students must take the exams during Michaelmas term and during Trinity term of each year, and those who pass the exams can enter the next year. Students who score at least 70% on the exams will receive a first-class honours degree, 60–69% an upper second-class honours degree, 50–59% a lower second-class honours degree, and 40–49% a third-class honours degree.

Most non-professional courses take a Bachelor of Arts (BA) degree. As a matter of tradition, bachelor's degree graduates are eligible, after seven years from matriculation and without additional study, to purchase for a fee an upgrade of their bachelor's degree to a Master of Arts.

Degree titles vary according to the subject of study. The Law School awards the LL.B., the LL.B. (ling. franc.) and the LL.B. (ling. germ.). Other degrees include the BAI (engineering) and BBS (business studies). The BSc degree is not in wide use although it is awarded by the School of Nursing and Midwifery; most science and computer science students are awarded a BA.

Since 2018, Trinity has offered a dual BA programme with Columbia University in New York City. Students of history, English, European studies, or Middle Eastern and European languages and culture may spend their first two years at Trinity and their last two years at Columbia.

=== Postgraduate ===
At postgraduate level, Trinity offers a range of taught and research degrees in all faculties. About 29% of students are post-graduate level, with 1,440 reading for a research degree and an additional 3,260 on taught courses (see Research and Innovation).

Trinity College's Strategic Plan sets "the objective of doubling the number of PhDs across all disciplines by 2013 in order to move towards a knowledge society. In order to achieve this, the college has received some of the largest allocations of Irish Government funding which have become competitively available to date."

In addition to academic degrees, the college offers Postgraduate Diploma (non-degree) qualifications, either directly or through associated institutions.

=== Research ===
The university operates an on-site Innovation Centre that promotes academic innovation and advising, provides patent counselling and in-depth research information, and also facilitates the creation and operation of industrial labs and campus businesses.

In 1999, the university purchased an enterprise centre on Pearse Street, a seven-minute walk from the on-site "Innovation Center." The site has over 19,000 square metres of built space and includes a protected building, the Tower, which houses a Craft Centre. The Trinity Enterprise Centre is home to companies from Dublin's university research sector.

=== Admissions ===
Undergraduate applications from Irish, British and European Union applicants are submitted and processed through the Central Applications Office (CAO) system. Trinity College instructs the CAO to administer all applications by standardised criteria before offering places to successful candidates. The college therefore has full control of admissions while ensuring anonymity and academic equality throughout the process.

Admission to the university is highly competitive and based exclusively on academic merit. To be considered for admission, applicants must first reach the university's minimum matriculation requirements, which typically involves holding sufficient recognised qualifications in English, mathematics and a second language; the mathematics requirement can be waived if Latin is presented as a second language.

Applicants for certain courses may be required to achieve more specific qualifications than those prescribed for minimum matriculation requirements.

Eligible applicants must then compete for places based on the results of their school leaving examinations, but can additionally take matriculation examinations which are held in the university in April, in which each subject is considered equivalent to that of the Irish Leaving Certificate. Applications for restricted courses require further assessment considered in the admissions process, such as the Health Professions Admissions Test (HPAT) for medicine or entrance tests for music and drama courses.

As applications for most courses far exceed available places, admission is highly selective, demanding excellent grades in the aforementioned examinations. Through the CAO, candidates may list several courses at Trinity College and at other third-level institutions in Ireland in order of preference. The CAO awards places in mid-August every year after matching the number of places available to the applicants' academic attainments. Qualifications are measured as "points", with specific scales for the Leaving Certificate, UK GCE A-level, the International Baccalaureate and all other European Union school-leaving examinations.

In 2016, there were 3,220 new entrants out of 18,469 CAO applicants, indicating a competitive acceptance rate of 17.4%.

For applicants who are not citizens or residents of the European Union, different procedures apply. Disadvantaged, disabled, or mature students can also be admitted through a program that is separate from the CAO, the Trinity Access Programme, which aims to facilitate the entry of sectors of society which would otherwise be under-represented.

Students from non-European countries, such as the United States, may be admitted directly if they have passed the International Baccalaureate or EU/EFTA exams and meet the minimum admission requirements. Admission is not guaranteed and places will be filled in order of merit by the applicants with the highest score.

For those who have not taken the above exams, there is the one-year Foundation Program. This includes essays, discussions, question and answer sessions and training in study to prepare students for admission to Trinity College. Students must demonstrate proficiency in English to be admitted to the Foundation Program and must have a minimum score on the IELTS, TOEFL or Duolingo English Test (DET). Requirements also vary depending on the program. In addition to English language proficiency, students must meet the high school score.

Admission to graduate study is handled directly by Trinity College.

=== Awards ===
==== Entrance Exhibition and sizarship ====
Students who enter with exceptional Leaving Certificate or other public examination results are awarded an Entrance Exhibition. This entails a prize in the form of book tokens to the value of €150.00. Exhibitioners who are of limited means are made Sizars, entitled to Commons (evening meal) free of charge.

==== Foundation Scholarship ====
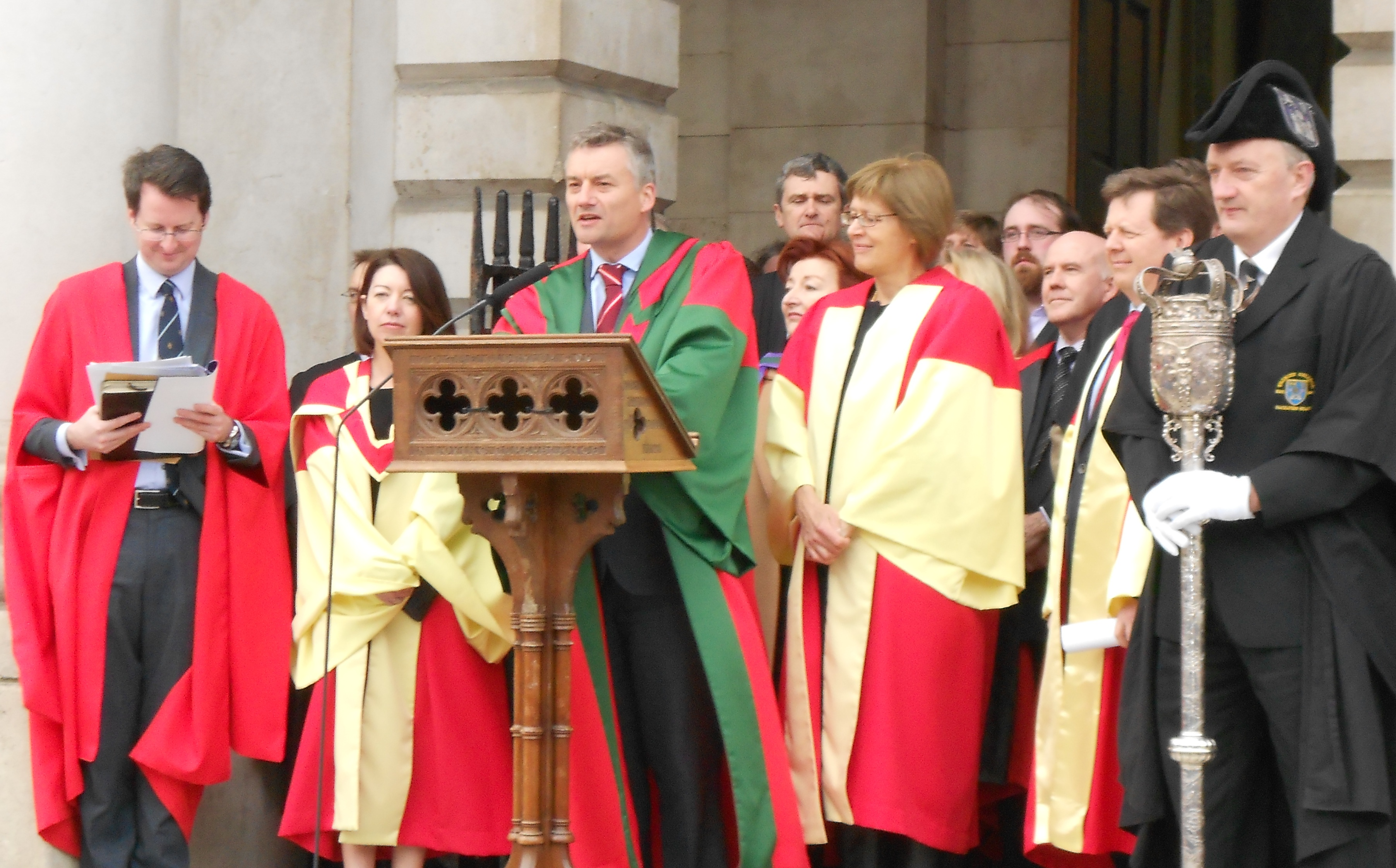
Announcement of Fellow and Scholars at Trinity College Dublin on Trinity Monday 2013

Undergraduate students of Senior Freshmen standing may elect to sit the Foundation Scholarship examination, which takes place in the Christmas Vacation, on the last week before Hilary term.

On Trinity Monday (the first day of Trinity Term), the Board of the college sits and elects to the Scholarship all those who achieve First in the examination. Election to become a scholar of Trinity Dublin is widely regarded as "the most prestigious undergraduate award in the country". Those from EU member countries are entitled to free rooms and Commons (the college's Formal Hall), an annual stipend and exemption from fees for the duration of their scholarship, which lasts 15 terms. Scholars from non-EU member countries have their fees reduced by the current value of EU member fees. Scholars may add the suffix "Sch." to their names, have the note "discip. schol." appended to their name at Commencements and are entitled to wear Bachelor's Robes and a velvet mortarboard.

Competition for Scholarship involves a searching examination and successful candidates must be of exceptional ability. The concept of scholarship is a valued tradition of the college, and many of the college's most distinguished members were elected scholars (including Samuel Beckett and Ernest Walton). The Scholars' dinner, to which 'Scholars of the decade' (those elected in the current year, and every year multiple of a decade previous to it, e.g., 2013, 2003,..) are invited, forms one of the major events in Trinity's calendar. One of the main objectives is the pursuit of excellence, and one of the most tangible manifestations of this objective is the institution of the scholarship.

Under the Foundation Charter (of 1592), Scholars were part of the body corporate (three Scholars were named in the charter "in the name of many"). Until 1609, there were about 51 Scholars at any one time. A figure of 70 was permanently fixed in the revising Letters Patent of Charles I in 1637. Trinity Monday was appointed as the day when all future elections to Fellowship and Scholarship would be announced (at this time Trinity Monday was always celebrated on the Monday after the feast of the Holy Trinity). Up to this point, all undergraduates were Scholars, but soon after 1637 the practice of admitting students other than Scholars commenced.

Until 1856, only the classical subjects were examined. The questions concerned all the classical authors prescribed for the entrance examination and for the undergraduate course up to the middle of the Junior Sophister year. The candidates had no new material to read, 'but they had to submit to a very searching examination on the fairly lengthy list of classical texts which they were supposed by this time to have mastered'. The close link with the undergraduate syllabus is underlined by the refusal until 1856 to admit Scholars to the Library (a request for admission was rejected by the Board in 1842, on the grounds that Scholars should stick to their prescribed books and not indulge in 'those desultory habits' that admission to an extensive library would encourage). During the second half of the 19th century, the content of the examination gradually came to include other disciplines.

Around the turn of the 20th century, "Non-Foundation" Scholarships were introduced. This initially was a device to permit women to be, in effect, elected Scholars, despite the then commonly accepted legal view that the statute revision of 1637 permitted only males to be elected Foundation Scholars. Clearly, when women were not permitted in the college, this had not caused any difficulties, but with the admission of women as full members of the college, an anomaly was created.

The Non-Foundation Scholarship granted to the women elected to it all the rights of men, with the exception of voting rights at a meeting of the Body Corporate, a very rare event in any case. As women are now admitted to Foundation Scholarship on exactly the same basis as men, Non-Foundation Scholarships are retained as a device to allow for more than 70 persons to be Scholars at any one time provided they meet the qualifying standards. Foundation Scholarships are given to those whose performance is considered particularly exceptional, with the remaining qualifying persons that year being elected as Non-Foundation Scholars. While the number of Foundation Scholars remains fixed at 70, there is, in theory, no limit on the number of Non-Foundation Scholars.

Non-Foundation and Foundation Scholars receive the same benefits and therefore the two groups are regarded in equal esteem and usually refer to themselves collectively as the Scholars of Trinity College Dublin.

=== Rankings ===
Trinity is ranked 75th in the world, 26th in Europe and 1st in Ireland in the QS World University Rankings (QS) 2025, one of the world's leading indicators of university evaluation. The highest ranking in the former combined QS-THE system was in 2009, when it was ranked 43rd in the world. Trinity is also ranked 173rd in the world and 1st in Ireland by the Times Higher Education World University Rankings (THE) in 2026.

In response to a long-term decline in rankings (from 43rd according to the last combined THE/QS ranking in 2009 to 88th in QS and 117th in THE for 2018), in 2014 Trinity announced a plan to reverse the trend, aiming to reenter the top 50. The dentistry program offered by the Dublin Dental University Hospital is ranked 51–75 in the world, while the programmes in English literature offered by the university was ranked 21st in the world in 2025.

University rankings

Global – Overall
- ARWU World: 201–300 (2025)
- QS World: 75 (2026)
- THE World: 173 (2026)
- USNWR Global: =206 (2025)

World University Rankings
Year	QS (Change)	THE (Change)
2004	87	N/A
2005	111 (▼24)	N/A
2006	78 (▲33)	N/A
2007	53 (▲25)	N/A
2008	49 (▲4)	N/A
2009	43 (▲6)	N/A
2010	52 (▼9)	N/A
2011	65 (▼13)	76
2012	67 (▲2)	117 (▼41)
2013	N/A	110 (▲7)
2014	61 (▲6)	129 (▼19)
2015	71 (▼10)	138 (▼9)
2016	78 (▼7)	101 (▲37)
2017	98 (▼20)	131 (▼30)
2018	88 (▲10)	117 (▲14)
2019	104 (▼16)	120 (▼3)
2020	108 (▼4)	164 (▼44)
2021	101 (▲7)	155 (▲9)
2022	101 ( 0)	146 (▲9)
2023	98 (▲3)	161 (▼15)
2024	81 (▲17)	134 (▲27)
2025	87 (▼6)	139 (▼5)
2026	75 (▲12)	173 (▼34)

== Student life ==
=== Societies ===
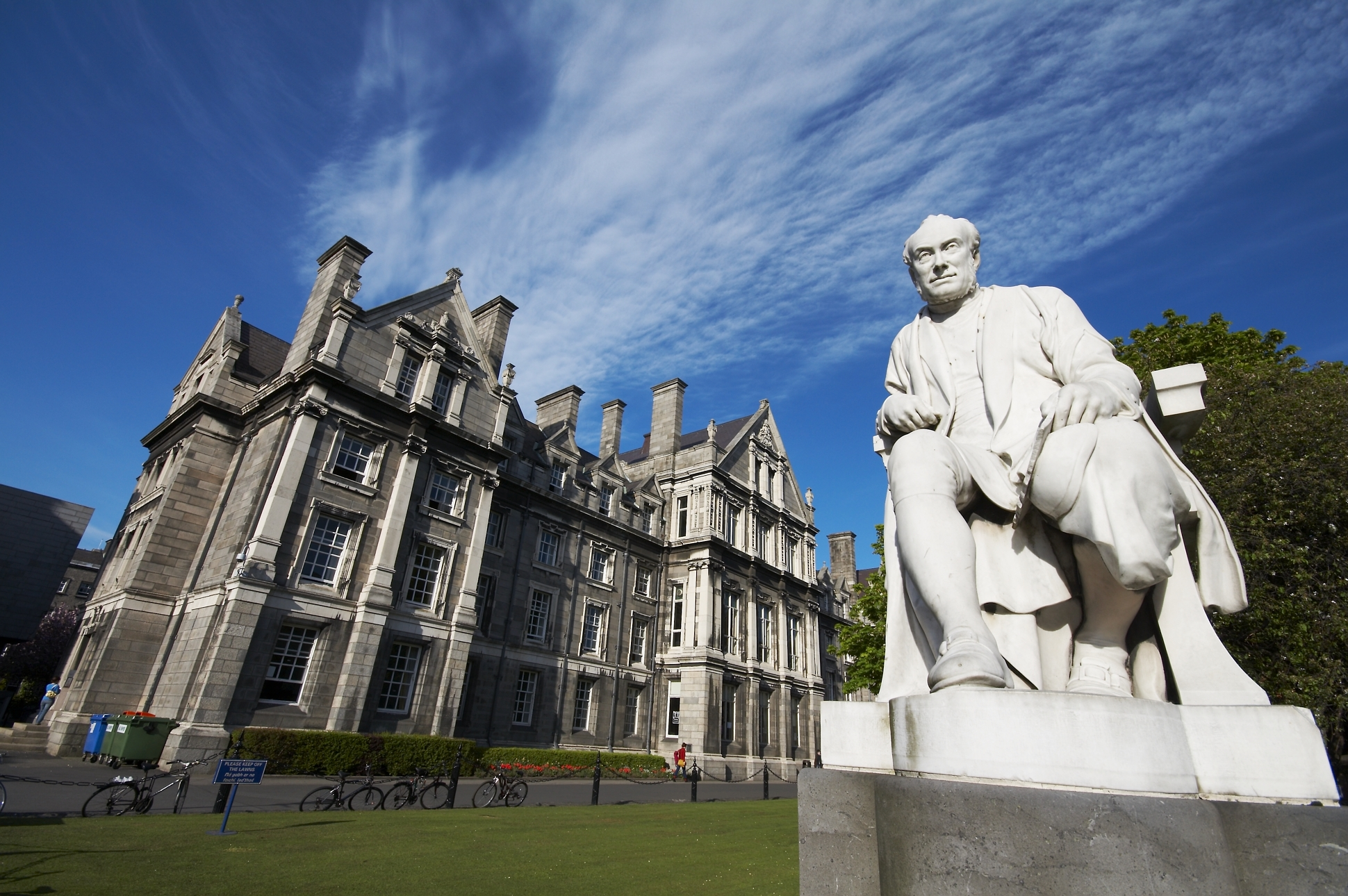
The University Philosophical Society, the College Historical Society and the College Theological Society hold debates and discussions in the Graduates Memorial Building.

As of 2020, Trinity College has 120+ societies. Student societies operate under the aegis of the Dublin University Central Societies Committee (CSC).

Situated in the Graduates Memorial Building (GMB) are the three oldest societies: University Philosophical Society (the Phil), the College Historical Society (the Hist) and the College Theological Society (the Theo). The Phil meets each Thursday evening in the chamber of the GMB, the Hist meets each Wednesday evening and the Theo meets each Monday evening. Both the Phil and the Hist claim to be the oldest such student society: the Phil claims to have been founded in 1683, although university records list its foundation as having occurred in 1853, while the Hist was founded in 1770, making it the college's oldest society according to the Calendar.

Records of Trinity's Chapel Choir date from 1762; as it was not yet an official university society, it is now not considered the oldest. Among the Phil's Honorary Patrons are multiple Nobel Prize laureates, heads of state, notable actors, entertainers and well-known intellectuals, such as Al Pacino, Desmond Tutu, Sir Christopher Lee, Stephen Fry, and John Mearsheimer. The Hist has been addressed by many notable orators, including Winston Churchill and Ted Kennedy, and counts among its former members many prominent men and women in Ireland's history.

Other societies include Vincent de Paul Society (VDP), which organises a large number of charitable activities in the local community; DU Players, theatre and drama societies which hosts more than 50 shows and events a year in the Players Theatre;

The DU Film Society, founded in 1987, which organises filmmakers and cinephiles in college through workshops, screenings, production funding, etc.; Trinity FM, which broadcasts six weeks a year on FM 97.3 with various student productions; and the Q Soc – Trinity LGBT society, which is Ireland's oldest LGBT society and celebrated its 25th anniversary in the 2007/08 year.

The Card and Bridge Society holds weekly poker and bridge tournaments and was the starting point for many notable alumni, including Andy Black, Padraig Parkinson and Donnacha O'Dea; the Dublin University Comedy Society, known as DU Comedy, hosts comedy events for its members and has hosted gigs in college by comedians such as Andrew Maxwell, David O'Doherty, Neil Delamere and Colin Murphy;

The Dance Society, known as "DU Dance", provides classes in Latin and ballroom dancing, as well as running events around other styles, such as swing dancing.

In 2011, the Laurentian Society was revived. It had played a key role as a society for the few Catholic students who studied at Trinity while "the Ban" was still in force. The Trinity Fashion Society was established in 2009, and holds an annual charity fashion show and an international trip to London Fashion Week.

=== Clubs ===
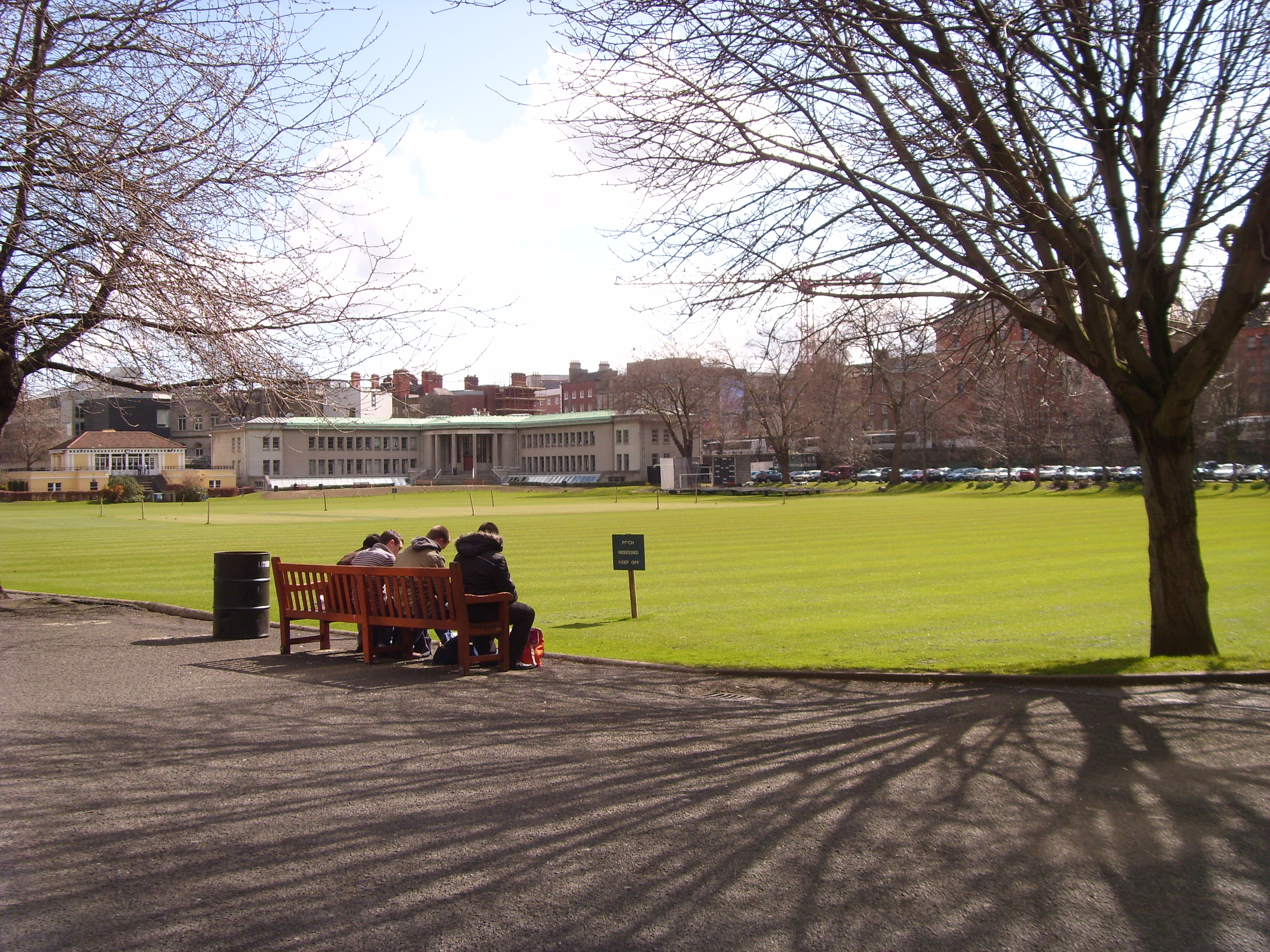
College Park, Trinity College

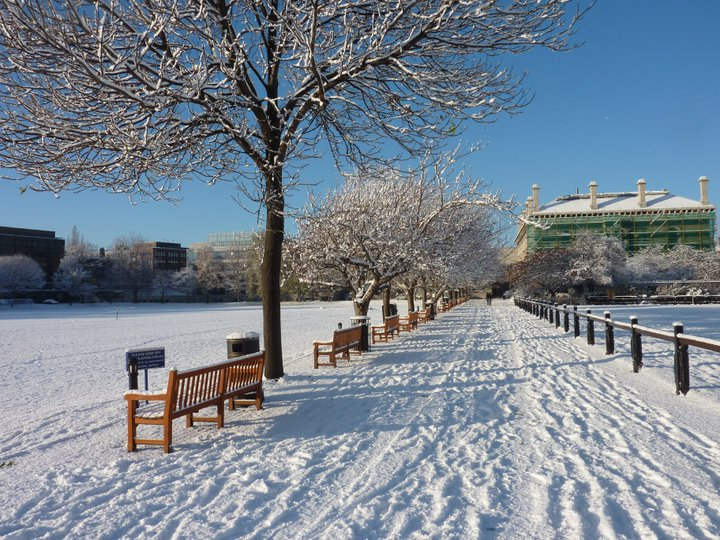
A winter scene in College Park

Trinity has a sporting tradition, and the college has 47 sports clubs affiliated to the Dublin University Central Athletic Club (DUCAC).

The Central Athletic Club is made up of five committees that oversee the development of sport in the college: the executive committee, which is responsible overall for all activities; the Captains' Committee, which represents the 47 club captains and awards University Colours (Pinks); the Pavilion Bar Committee, which runs the private members' bar; the Pavilion Members' Committee.

The oldest clubs include the Dublin University Cricket Club (1835), the Dublin University Boat Club (1836) and Dublin University Fencing Club (1774). Dublin University Football Club, founded in 1854, plays rugby union and is the world's oldest documented "football club". Dublin University A.F.C., founded in 1883, is the oldest surviving association football club in the Republic of Ireland. The Dublin University Hockey Club was founded in 1893, and the Dublin University Harriers and Athletic Club in 1885.

The newest club in the university is the American football team, who were accepted into the Irish American Football League (IAFL) in 2008. The Dublin University Fencing Club has won a total of 43 titles in 66 years. While the modern DU Fencing Club was founded in 1936, its origins can be dated to the 1700s when a 'Gentleman's Club of the Sword' existed, primarily for duelling practice.

=== Publications ===
Trinity College has a tradition of student publications, ranging from the serious to the satirical. Most student publications are administered by Trinity Publications, previously called the Dublin University Publications Committee (often known as 'Pubs'), which maintains and administers the Publications office (located in No 6) and all the associated equipment needed to publish newspapers and magazines.

From 1869 to 1893, the literary magazine Kottabos was published, edited by Robert Yelverton Tyrrell. It has been called 'perhaps the cream of Irish academic wit and scholarship'.

There are two student newspapers: The University Times and Trinity News. The University Times is funded by the Students' Union and has won national and international awards since its inception in 2009, including the award for best non-daily student newspaper in the world from the US-based Society of Professional Journalists. Trinity News is Ireland's oldest student newspaper, launched in 1953. It publishes both an online edition and a print edition every three weeks during the academic year. For the last 10 years, the paper has been edited by a full-time student editor, who takes a sabbatical year from their studies, supported by a voluntary part-time staff of 30 student section editors and writers.

Student magazines currently in publication include the satirical newspaper The Piranha (formerly Piranha! magazine but rebranded in 2009), the generalist T.C.D. Miscellany (founded in 1895; one of Ireland's oldest magazines), the film journal Trinity Film Review (TFR) and the literary Icarus.

Other publications include the Student Economic Review and the Trinity College Law Review, produced independently by students of economics and law respectively; the Trinity College Journal of Postgraduate Research, produced by the Graduate Students Union; the Social and Political Review (SPR); the Trinity Student Medical Journal; and The Attic, student writing produced by the Dublin University Literary Society. More recent publications include Trinity Business Review (TBR) and The Burkean Journal, a politically and culturally conservative magazine named after one of Trinity's most notable alumni, Edmund Burke.

=== Ball ===
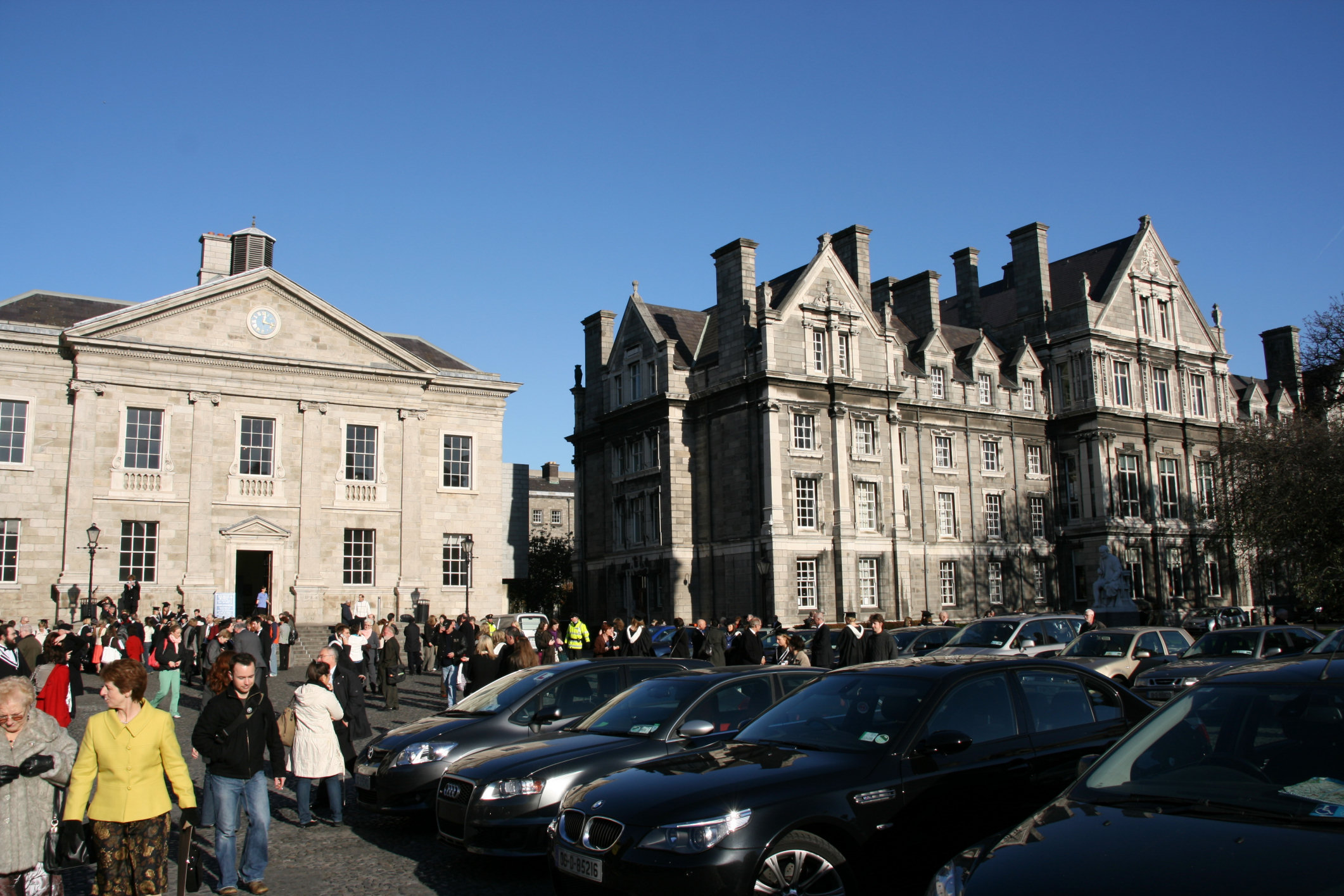
Trinity College Commencements

The Trinity Ball is an annual black-tie music and social event held at Trinity College Dublin. It has been described as "Europe's biggest private party", and marked its 50th anniversary in 2009, when 8,000 tickets sold out. By 2010, the ball was held in Front Square and in marquees around the campus, with concert promoters MCD involved in its organisation. The Ball has been associated with Trinity Ents, Trinity College Dublin Students' Union and Trinity's Central Societies Committee. In 2023, the TCDSU Ents Officer worked with MCD and the Trinity Ball Committee to stage the event.

=== Students' Union ===
Trinity College Dublin Students' Union is recognised by the college as a representative organisation for students and acts as a channel between students and college authorities. Its structures include elected sabbatical officers, class representatives, school and faculty convenors, Union Forum and Students' Union Council. All capitated students are members of the union and may vote in sabbatical officer elections. Three student union members sit on the College Board.

== Traditions and culture ==
=== Commons ===
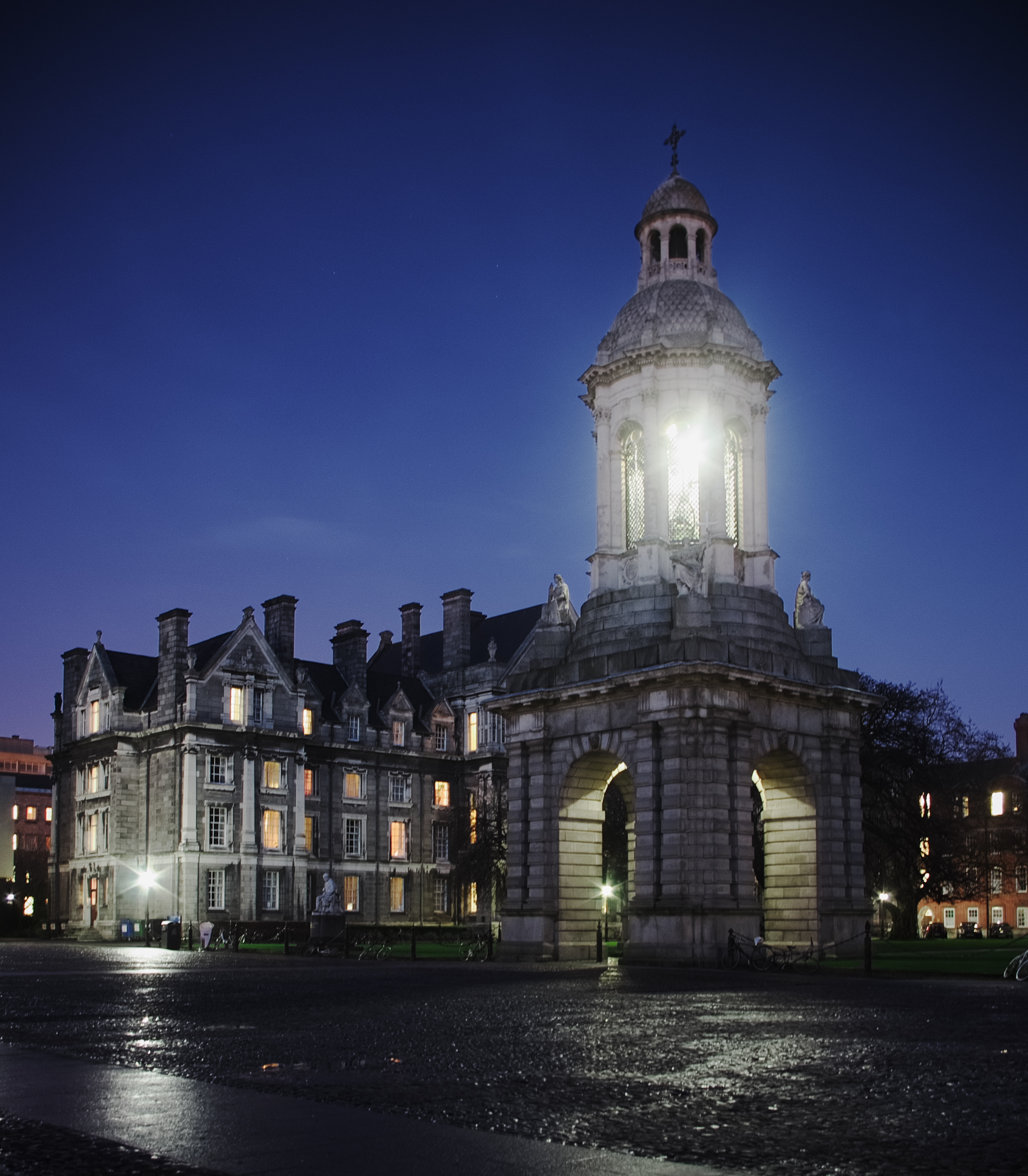
The TCD Campanile

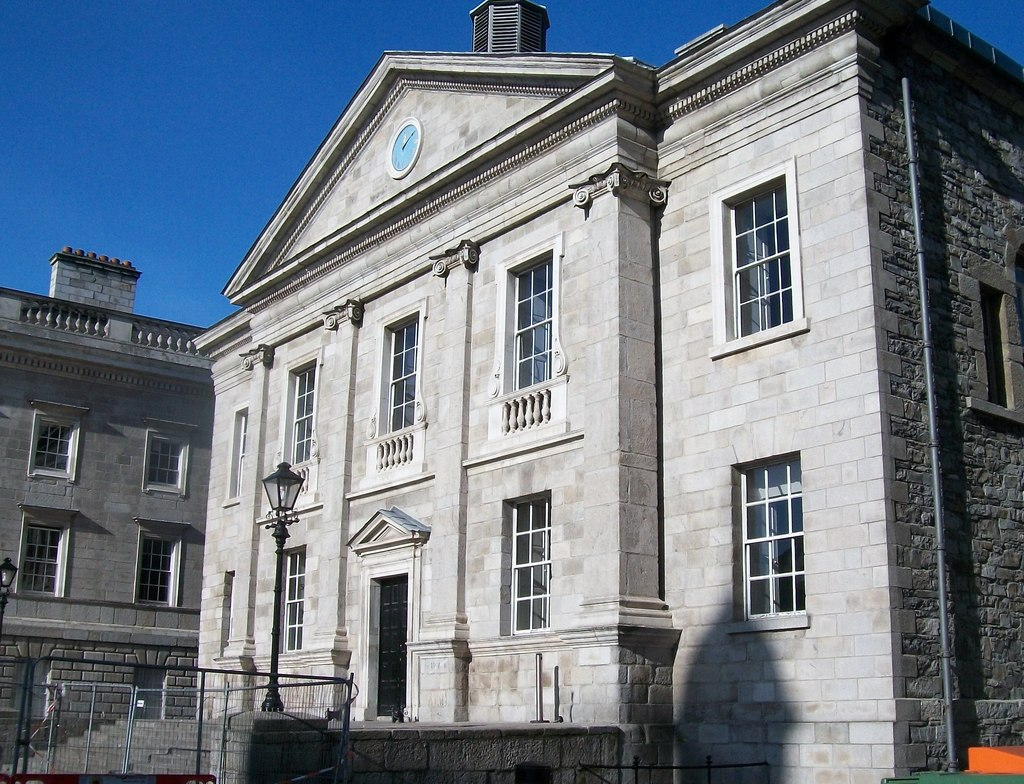
The Old Dining Hall, designed by Richard Cassels in 1743

Commons is a three-course meal served in the College Dining Hall Monday to Friday, attended by Scholars, Fellows and Sizars of the college, as well as other members of the college community and their guests. Commons starts at 18:15 during the week, and its start is signalled by a dramatic slamming of the Dining Hall doors. A Latin grace prayer is said "before and after dinner", read by one of the scholars. During Advent, members of the Chapel Choir, the oldest choir in the university, sing Christmas carols to accompany the meals.

=== Trinity Week ===
Trinity Week begins each year on Trinity Monday in mid-April. The start of this week is marked by the election of Fellows and Scholars to the College on Trinity Monday. The board of the college, having chosen the new Scholars (those who achieved a First in the Foundation Scholarship) and Fellows, announce in front square those appointed, before an ecumenical service is held in the College Chapel, with music sung by the Chapel Choir.

=== Other traditions ===
Trinity has a longstanding friendly rivalry with nearby University College Dublin. Every year, "colours" events are contested between the sporting clubs and debating societies of the respective colleges.

== In popular culture ==
The literary works of Trinity graduates, especially Wilde, Swift, Beckett, Goldsmith, Synge, and Stoker contributed to Irish literature, and played a major role in Dublin's recognition in 2010 as a UNESCO City of Literature. Trinity's libraries and their collections of texts, original manuscripts and writings of Irish authors and intellectuals, as well as the Book of Kells, also played an important part during the selection process.

The Irish writer J. P. Donleavy was a student in Trinity and a number of his books feature characters who attend Trinity, including The Ginger Man and The Beastly Beatitudes of Balthazar B.

Fictional Naval Surgeon Stephen Maturin of Patrick O'Brian's popular Aubrey–Maturin series is a graduate of Trinity College. The character is played by Paul Bettany in the 2003 film Master and Commander: The Far Side of the World. Claire Kilroy's novel All Names Have Been Changed is set in Trinity College in the 1990s. The story follows a group of creative writing students and their enigmatic professor. A photograph of Trinity is used in the cover art.

Barry McCrea's novel The First Verse is set in Trinity College. The narrative focuses on freshman Niall Lenihan's search for identity and companionship and details his involvement with mysticism at the college. In Karen Marie Moning's The Fever Series Trinity College is said to be where the main character, MacKayla Lane's sister Alina, was attending school on scholarship before she was murdered. The college is also where several of the minor characters who inform Ms. Lane about her sister are said to work.

In Cecelia Ahern's novel Thanks for the Memories, Justin Hitchcock is a guest lecturer at Trinity College.

Parts of Michael Collins, The First Great Train Robbery, Circle of Friends, Educating Rita, Ek Tha Tiger and Quackser Fortune Has a Cousin in the Bronx were filmed in Trinity College. It served as the filming location for Luftwaffe headquarters in The Blue Max. In the Channel 4 television series Hollyoaks, Craig Dean attends Trinity College.

In the Star Trek: Voyager episode Fair Haven set in a holographic 19th century Ireland near Dublin, Captain Janeway reprograms the hologram character Michael Sullivan to have "the education of a 19th century 3rd year student at Trinity College".

In Sally Rooney's 2018 novel Normal People and its 2020 television adaptation, the main characters, Connell Waldron and Marianne Sheridan, are students at Trinity College and are elected scholars. Rooney studied English as a scholar in Trinity.

In the television adaptation, Connell is played by former Trinity College (The Lir Academy) student Paul Mescal; two other actors in the series, Frank Blake (who plays Marianne's older brother Alan) and Kwaku Fortune (who plays Philip, a friend of Marianne's at Trinity), are also alumni of the Lir Academy. Series director and executive producer Lenny Abrahamson studied philosophy at Trinity and was also elected a scholar. Following the broadcast of the series, Trinity was widely reported to have received a substantial increase in applications, to a total of over 40,000, including a small increase in applications from the United Kingdom.

The Oscar Wilde Memorial Sculpture in Dublin's Merrion Square depicts Wilde wearing the Trinity College postgraduate tie.

== Notable people ==
Amongst the past students/graduates (and some staff) are such notable figures as:

- Samuel Beckett (Nobel Laureate in Literature)
- George Berkeley
- Daniel Bradley
- Francis Brambell
- Edmund Burke
- J.B. Bury
- William Campbell (Nobel Laureate in Medicine)
- Michael Coey
- William Congreve
- Thomas Davis
- Henry Horatio Dixon
- Edward Dowden
- Francis Ysidro Edgeworth
- Robert Emmet
- George Ensor
- George Francis FitzGerald
- Gordon Foster
- Edward Francis Bani Forster
- Percy French
- Oliver Goldsmith
- Henry Grattan
- Olivia Grosvenor, Duchess of Westminster
- Veronica Guerin
- John Winthrop Hackett
- William Rowan Hamilton
- Edward Hincks
- Nathaniel Hone the Younger
- Ludwig Hopf
- John Kells Ingram
- John Hewitt Jellett
- John Joly
- William Johnston
- Gregorios Joseph
- Peter Lalor
- Dionysius Lardner
- Sheridan Le Fanu
- Bartholomew Lloyd
- Humphrey Lloyd (physicist)
- Thomas Ranken Lyle
- James MacCullagh
- Mairead Maguire (Nobel Peace Prize)
- Edmond Malone
- Charles Maturin
- Richard Maunsell
- Albert Joseph McConnell
- George Francis Mitchell
- William Molyneux
- Thomas Moore
- Hans Motz
- Charles Algernon Parsons
- Thomas Preston
- Louise Richardson
- George Salmon
- Brendan Scaife
- Erwin Schrödinger
- Samson Shatashvili
- Edward Stafford
- Bram Stoker
- Whitley Stokes (physician)
- Whitley Stokes (Celtic scholar)
- George Johnstone Stoney
- Jonathan Swift
- James Joseph Sylvester
- Edward Hutchinson Synge
- John Lighton Synge
- John Millington Synge
- John Trenchard
- Wolfe Tone
- Frederick Thomas Trouton
- Jaja Wachuku
- Ernest Walton (Nobel Laureate in Physics)
- Denis Weaire
- Michael Roberts Westropp
- E. T. Whittaker
- Oscar Wilde

Others include four previous holders of the office of President of Ireland, Douglas Hyde, Éamon de Valera, Mary Robinson and Mary McAleese, and two holders of the office of Taoiseach, Éamon de Valera and Leo Varadkar (De Valera matriculated as "Edward de Valera"). Alumni and faculty associated with Trinity include 56 Fellows of the Royal Society of the United Kingdom, 8 Nobel laureates, 14 Chief Justices of the Supreme Court of Ireland, and recipients of the Pulitzer Prize, Tang Prize, Faraday Medal, Wollaston Medal, and the Pour le Mérite. Additionally, as of 2025, the university has also produced 79 Fulbright, 152 Laidlaw, and 65 Mitchell scholars.

Trinity alumni invented the binaural stethoscope, steam turbine, and hypodermic needle; pioneered seismology, leprosy cure, radiotherapy, and linear algebra; performed the first artificial nuclear transmutation; and coined the term electron. The university is also associated with four Presidents and 14 Chief Justices of Ireland, five Victoria Cross and six Copley Medal recipients, and three of the best-selling novelists of all time.

== See also ==
- Academic dress of the University of Dublin
- Dublin University (constituency)
- Education in the Republic of Ireland
- List of chancellors of the University of Dublin
- List of professorships at the University of Dublin
- List of universities in the Republic of Ireland
- Trinity Hall, Dublin
