= List of Trinity College Dublin student organisations =

This is a list of Trinity College Dublin student organisations. The 2025–26 Trinity College Dublin Calendar listed 118 recognised societies, seven student publications and 49 sports clubs.

== Types of organisations ==
=== Clubs ===
Trinity College has 49 sports clubs. Student sport clubs are represented by the Trinity Sport Union, whose structures include an executive, the Captains' Committee and the Pavilion Bar Committee. The oldest clubs include the Dublin University Cricket Club (1835) and Dublin University Boat Club (1836). Dublin University Rifle Club was first founded in 1840 however the club under its current format was reconstituted in 1962. Dublin University Football Club which plays rugby football was founded in 1854 and is one of the world's oldest documented "football club". The Dublin University Hockey Club was founded in 1893. The Dublin University Harriers and Athletic Club was founded in 1885.

=== Publications ===
Trinity Publications Committee is a capitated body in Trinity College Dublin which distributes an annual grant among student publication efforts. Trinity News describes itself as Ireland's oldest student newspaper and says that it has been in publication since 1953. The University Times is a Trinity student newspaper founded in 2009. It is financially supported by Trinity College Dublin Students' Union, but editorially independent of the Union. Major publications described by Trinity Publications include Trinity News, TCD Miscellany, The Piranha and Icarus.

=== Societies ===
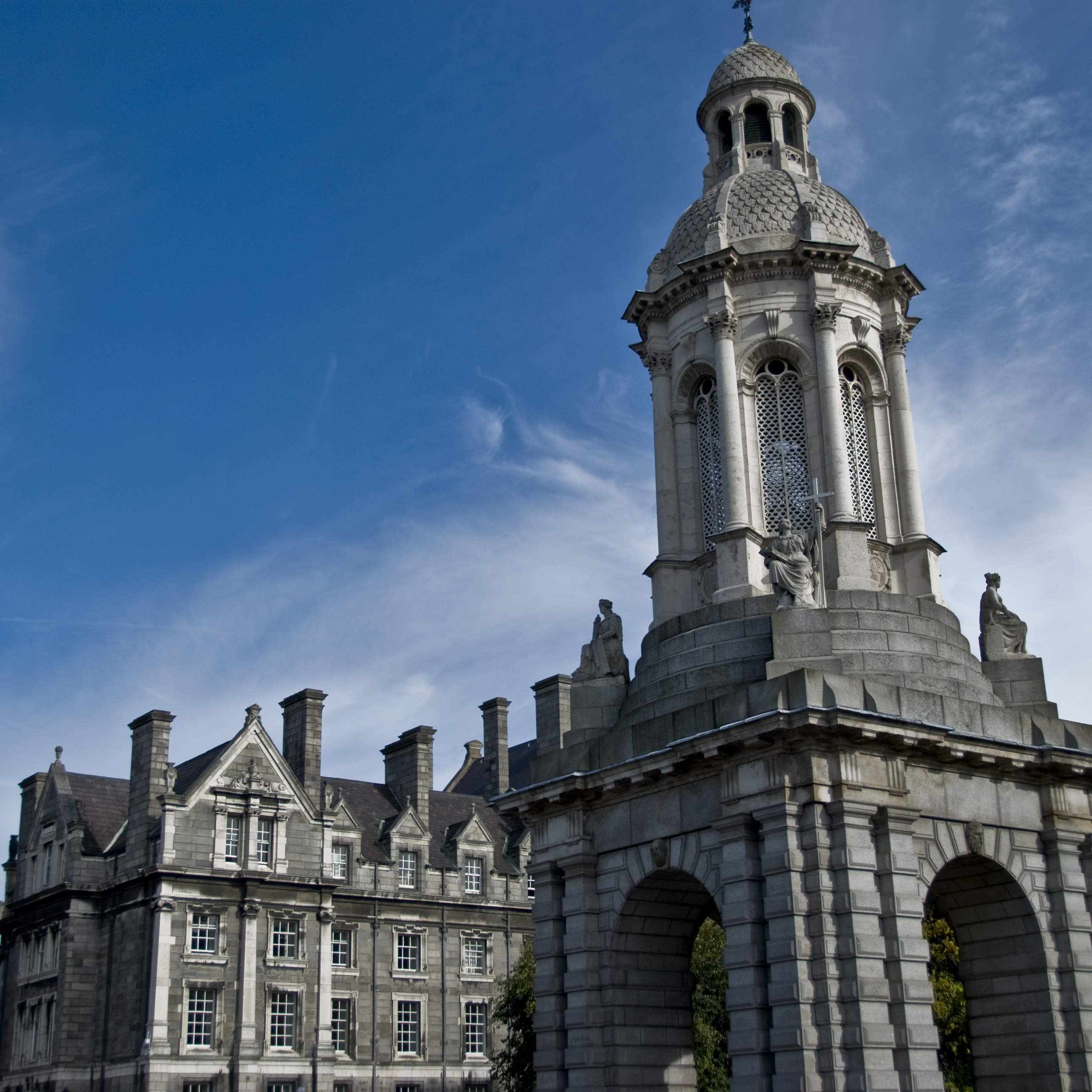
Graduates Memorial Building (left) and Campanile(right)

Trinity College has 118 recognised societies, which operate under the aegis of the Dublin University Central Societies Committee. The Central Societies Committee is a student-led body which supports and represents recognised societies. Its executive consists of student officers and ordinary members elected by the treasurers of recognised societies. Situated within the Graduates Memorial Building is the oldest of Ireland's such societies, the College Historical Society (The Hist). Founded in 1770, the society has a history in the promotion of oratory and composition. It is the oldest debating society in Ireland, and "perhaps" the oldest student society in the world. Over the past three centuries, it has been addressed by the world’s pre-eminent thinkers and orators. The society meets each Wednesday evening to debate motions of interest in the chamber of the Graduate Memorial Building (GMB). Another such society is the University Philosophical Society (The Phil) which shares the GMB and promotes discourse among students. The Society can traces it origins to 1853 when it was set up as a paper reading society, inspired by the Dublin Philosophical Society. While the Phil still hosts paper readings, its primary functions is as a debating society. Throughout the twentieth century, there was ongoing discussion about the possibility of a merger between the Student Representative Council, the Hist, the Phil, and the Eliz (The Dublin University Elizabethan Society founded in 1905). In 1981, the Eliz merged with the Phil and today it remains a subcommittee of the Phil promoting the involvement of women in debating. The Phil meets each Thursday evening of Term to debate motions in the chamber of the GMB. Other societies include DU Players, a student-drama society based in the Samuel Beckett Theatre; The DU Film Society (formerly DU Filmmakers, formerly the DU "Videographic Society", founded in 1987) which organises filmmakers and film-lovers on campus through workshops, screenings, and production funding; The DU Radio Society, known as Trinity FM, a student radio society; The Trinity LGBT society, which is the oldest LGBT society in Ireland and celebrated its 25th anniversary in the 2007/2008 year; The Dublin University Comedy Society, known as DU Comedy, hosts comedy events for its members and hosts comedy gigs on campus; The Dance Society, known as "dudance", which provides classes in Latin and ballroom dancing, as well as running events around other dance styles such as swing dancing. In 2011 the Laurentian Society was revived. This society played a role as a society for the few Catholic students who studied at Trinity while "the Ban" (on Catholic attendance) was still in force.

=== Representative bodies ===
Trinity College Dublin students are represented by Trinity College Dublin Students' Union (TCDSU), whose structures include sabbatical officers, class representatives and part-time officers. Following the withdrawal of TCD's engagement with the former Graduate Students' Union in 2022, postgraduate representation was integrated into TCDSU structures; in October 2025, TCDSU members approved constitutional changes including a graduate officer and postgraduate taught and research officer roles.

== List of societies ==
=== An Cumann Gaelach ===
An Cumann Gaelach is Trinity College Dublin's Irish-language society and aims to promote the language on and off campus. The society organises Irish-language events including debates, recitals, guest speakers and workshops. An earlier Central Societies Committee profile also listed céilíthe, music sessions, lectures, trips to the Gaeltacht, conversation circles and Éigse na Tríonóide, a week-long celebration of the Irish language and culture held towards the beginning of Hilary term, among its activities. It publishes the Irish-language college magazine Tuathal, which has been nominated for Society Publication of the Year at the National Student Media Awards. A campaign led by the society resulted in the opening of the college's Seomra na Gaeilge in 2012 by Raidió na Gaeltachta presenter Seán Bán Breathnach and Trinity provost Patrick Prendergast. The society won first place in Glór na nGael's third-level competition for 2012 and 2013.

=== Biological Association ===
The Biological Association, also known as Biosoc, describes itself as one of Ireland's largest and oldest medical student societies. The main role of the Biosoc was originally to provide a forum of discussion in the field of Natural Science, however, over the years it began to change this role eventually becoming a social society for medical students. It runs the "Med Day" charity event every November, raising money for Trinity-affiliated teaching hospitals.

=== Charities ===
Examples of recognised Trinity societies with charitable, advocacy or community-service functions include Trinity Vincent de Paul, Trinity Cancer Society and Trinity Free Legal Advice Centre (FLAC). Trinity Cancer Society has raised money through an annual "naked calendar".

=== Choral Society ===
The University of Dublin Choral Society is the largest choir in Trinity College Dublin. It is also the oldest university choral society in Great Britain and Ireland and the third oldest society in Trinity, having been founded in 1837. Traditionally, the society performed one concert for each of the three terms, with the third concert known as the Ladies' Concert, as women had been permitted to attend before their admission to Trinity. With the introduction of semesters, two concerts are now performed each year, one at the end of each semester. The tradition that members wear the formal academic gown for performances is upheld and concerts take place in the College Exam Hall and College Chapel. The Library of Trinity College Dublin holds a collection of music performed by the society during the late-nineteenth and early-twentieth centuries as well as programmes dating back to the society's founding.

=== College Historical Society ===
The College Historical Society (or "Hist") is Ireland's oldest debating society, having been established within the college in 1770.

=== College Theological Society ===
The College Theological Society, commonly known as "The Theo", was founded in 1830. The society's original purpose was to train ordinands "in ecclesiastical history and polemical divinity". According to its constitution, the objective of the society is to afford members the opportunity to study theology and to "encourage the practice of written composition, and extempore speaking". It also "promotes inter-religious dialogue" and discusses the role of religion within society. It has covered topics including human rights, current affairs, faith and the climate crisis. In addition to discussion and debate, members also meet to listen to guest speakers during weekly Monday events in the Chamber of the Graduates Memorial Building. The Theo is based in the Bram Stoker Room in the same building.

=== Comedy Society ===
The Dublin University Comedy Society (Comedy Soc.) hosts comedy events for its members and has hosted gigs on campus from comedians such as Andrew Maxwell, David O'Doherty, Neil Delamere and Colin Murphy. The society has existed in one form or another for many years, going under the name "The Dead Parrot Society" in the 1990s but experienced a massive resurgence in activity in 2007. The society signed up over 700 members in 2007, and over 2500 members in 2008.

=== Dublin University Players ===
Dublin University Players hosts more than 40 student-led productions a year, as well as events, workshops and festivals.

=== Joly Geological Society ===
Named after John Joly, the Joly Geological Society was founded in 1960. As well as social events the society organises field trips.

=== Laurentian Society ===
The Laurentian Society is a society named after Saint Laurence O'Toole and which is concerned with relevant issues from a Catholic perspective. It existed with no interruptions between the academic years 1952-3 and 2001-2, and was revived in 2011.

=== LGBT Society / Q Soc ===
Trinity LGBT, later rebranded as Q Soc, is a society which supports the needs of lesbian, gay, bisexual and transgender students and their friends in Trinity College Dublin. The LGBT organises social and community events while offering help and support for LGBT students and providing a safe space for LGBT students on campus. Trinity College recognised the society in 1982 making it the oldest student LGBT society in Ireland. Trinity LGBT was founded in 1982 as "Dublin University Gay Soc", emerging directly from the Sexual Liberation Movement of David Norris and other Irish gay rights pioneers who were active in Trinity in the early 1970s.

=== LitSoc / Trinity Literary Society ===
The Trinity College Dublin Literary Society (LitSoc) is the foremost society for the creation and celebration of literature in Trinity College Dublin, with a constitutional aim "to kindle and encourage a love of writing, literature and literary culture among the staff and students of Trinity College". Initially begun as a branch of the English Speaking Union, the society was revived in 1996 and changed its name to the Trinity Literary Society in 1998. LitSoc holds an average of two major events every week, in addition to regular writing workshops, book clubs, open mics and guest speakers, and is open for library hours daily from 12 to 3pm. The society was nominated for 6 awards at the Central Societies Committee awards ceremony in March 2017, winning Best Online Presence, Best Medium Society and Overall Society of the Year.

=== Mathsoc ===
Dublin University Mathematical Society, was founded in 1923 and has had many famous members since its foundation, including Ireland's only Nobel Physics Laureate Ernest Walton who helped found it. It is affectionately referred to as the Mathsoc by its members. The Mathsoc has a society room in college, in the School of Mathematics, which contains the Mathsoc library.

=== Photographic Association (DUPA) ===
The Photography Association at Trinity was established in 1948. The Dublin University Photography Association (DUPA) offers educational activities, including workshops, classes and guest lectures, and provides members with access to photographic equipment, darkrooms and studio facilities. DUPA also holds photography exhibitions "multiple times each term". DUPA was awarded Best Medium Society and Best Overall Society at the 2015 Annual Central Societies Committee Society of the Year Awards.

=== Republican Club / Workers' Party TCD ===
Trinity's Republican Club was officially recognised as a college society in 1967. Trinity News described it as the first self-proclaimed society involved in "practical politics" to receive official sanction from the college authorities. The club was associated with the Official Republican movement and later became one of the college's largest student groups. Workers' Party TCD was re-established as a recognised Trinity society in 2018, after organisers collected 300 signatures for Central Societies Committee recognition. In 2021, Trinity News described Workers' Party TCD as proceeding from the Republican Club and reported that it attracted around 75 members a year.

=== Society For International Affairs (SoFIA) ===
The Society for International Affairs (SoFIA) aims to promote the discussion of diplomacy and diplomatic affairs, to give visibility to current international affairs and provide a platform for discussion and networking. It also seeks to acquaint students with the activities and mechanisms of embassies and foreign affairs departments and, guide students considering a diplomatic career.

=== Traditional Music Society ===
DU Traditional Music Society (TradSoc) promotes traditional Irish music in the college and runs workshops and recitals.

=== Trinitones ===
Trinitones is an all-male acappella ensemble established in 2012 which is one of the four choirs which make up "Trinity College Singers Society", along with Trinity Singers, Boydell Singers and fellow acappella group, Trinity Belles. Established in 2012, the group have toured Ireland and Australia and have released several covers of popular songs, most notably a viral music video of an acappella arrangement of Teenage Dirtbag by Wheatus in 2013.

=== Trinity Arts Festival Society ===
The Trinity Arts Festival Society coordinates a week-long arts festival within Trinity College Dublin. Established in 2006, the festival is organised by a society committee with a goal to "promote the arts and arts-based societies within Trinity College and around Dublin". The society has won category awards at the Central Societies Committee Society of the Year Awards. The society were also awarded second place in the college's "Equality Champions Awards" in April 2017.

=== Trinity Arts Workshop ===
Trinity Arts Workshop runs weekly workshops and studio hours in media including watercolours, drawing, pottery and painting.

=== Trinity FM (radio society) ===
Trinity FM is Trinity College Dublin's student radio society and student-run online radio station, founded in 2002. It operates during the college year from a studio in House 6. In 2023, The University Times reported that it broadcast online on weekdays from 3 pm to midnight, had 484 members in 2022, and had 166 daily listeners after the launch of its October 2023 schedule.

=== Wolfe Tone Cumann / Fianna Fáil Society ===
Trinity College Fianna Fáil cumann (branch) is named in honour of Theobald Wolfe Tone. The Cumann was officially constituted in 1967 and was initially named in honour of Erskine Childers, but was renamed in 1998 in celebration of the bicentenary of the 1798 Rebellion. It hosts regular meetings and participates in campaigns in support of Fianna Fáil and Ógra Fianna Fáil.

=== University Philosophical Society ===
The University Philosophical Society (or "Phil") is a paper-reading and debating society which was founded in 1853. It facilitates debating in Trinity through chamber debates and competitive debating, both internally and externally.

=== Defunct societies ===
- Astronomy and Space Society (Trinity)
- Karting Society
- One World Society
- Speech and Language Pathology Society
- Dublin University Real Estate Society (DURES)
