= Laurentian Society =

Dublin University Laurentian Society
- Founded: Academic year 1952–53
- Website: trinitysocieties.ie/society/124

The Laurentian Society is a society of Trinity College Dublin, named after Saint Laurence O'Toole (Lorcán Ua Tuathail in Irish), and concerned with relevant issues from a Catholic perspective. It was the Catholic society of Trinity College, and it existed with no interruptions between the academic years 1952–53 and 2001–02. During those years, the society held talks on various issues and was engaged in charitable activities. The society played a role in opposing the ban on Catholics entering Trinity College, and was also influential on other groups of the college, such as the G.A.A. club of Trinity. In September 2011, the society was revived, being granted provisional recognition by the Trinity College Central Societies Committee. The revived society was granted full recognition on 19 March 2013 at the Annual General Meeting of the same Societies Committee.

== History ==
The Laurentian was a society of Trinity College Dublin, created during the academic year 1952-3. Trinity News articles differ in the exact year in which it was founded, since one number says that it was created in 1952, whereas other says that it was created in 1953. The society celebrated its tenth anniversary in 1963.

This society was named after Saint Laurence O'Toole (Lorcán Ua Tuathail in Irish), a bishop of Dublin and an abbot of Glendalough. He was born in Ireland in 1128, and died in Normandy, 14 November 1180; he was canonised in 1225 by Pope Honorius III.

"The Laurentian Society was founded in 1953 as a social society for the 200 odd Roman Catholics attending Trinity". The reason for this small number of Catholics attending Trinity had a long history. During the time of the Penal Laws (17th and 18th centuries) Catholics were prevented from being educated in Ireland. Once these laws were abolished, "Catholics and Dissenters were excluded from Trinity College by the extension of religious tests in 1637. Even after their removal in 1773–74, students could not hold scholarships or fellowships without taking oaths which were anathema to the Catholic faith. Although Fawcett's University of Dublin Tests Act 1873 (36 & 37 Vict. c. 21) removed the requirement to take these oaths, the Catholic hierarchy denounced this measure as 'an act of secularisation', and continued to warn Catholic students against entering Trinity College". The Catholic Church required Catholics to have a special dispensation before being allowed to attend Trinity College, as this university was seen as a danger for their faith, a decision made by Archbishop John Charles McQuaid that generated much controversy. Even in 1969, "Irish Catholic students wishing to attend University in Dublin [were] directed to the National University, or UCD University College Dublin, as it is better known".

== Objectives ==
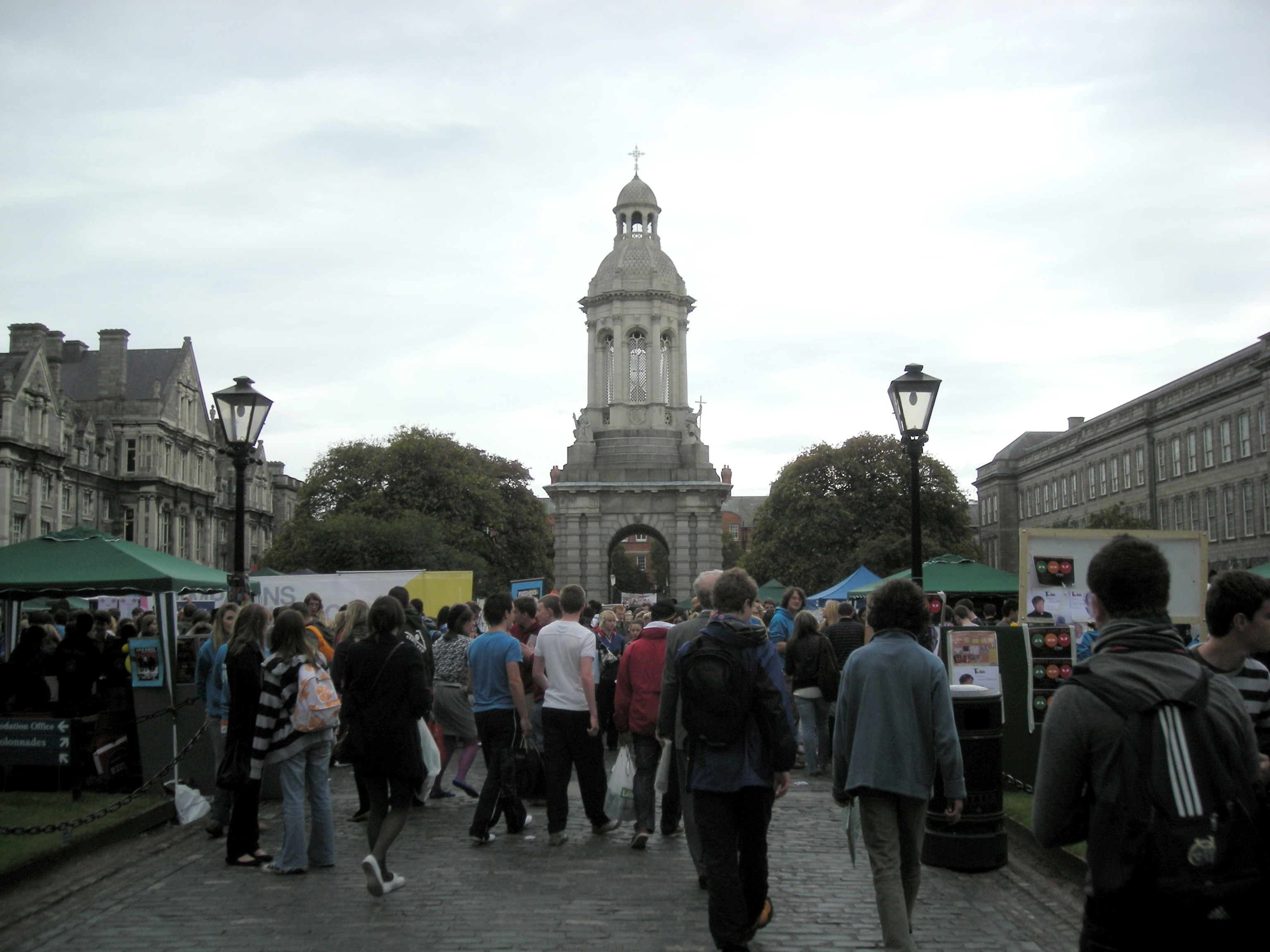
Freshers' Week at Front Square of Trinity College

Originally the object of the society was "to provide social facilities for undergraduates (elegible [sic] for ordinary membership) and also graduates and members of the staff (elegible [sic] for associate membership) who are members of the Roman Catholic Church." It is also said that its "ultimate aim" was to get a chaplain for college, but this society continued existing for a few decades after a Catholic chaplain was appointed in Trinity. Subsequently the object of the society was modified. Thus, in 1977–78, the society would be described as one "concerned with contemporary social and religious issues from a christian perspective".

As of 2017, the objectives of the society (as per its constitution) included:

1. to contribute to the cultural and social enrichment of the college,
2. to provide a forum for the exposition and discussion of historical and contemporary issues pertaining to Catholic culture from a Catholic perspective,
3. to educate interested members of the campus community on aspects of Catholicism.

== Society and controversy about "the Ban" ==
Members of the Laurentian Society did not agree with the Ban imposed on Catholic students attending Trinity College, in operation since 1875. Besides the requirement of Catholics to obtain a dispensation for entering Trinity, the Ban meant that the Laurentian Society would "[have] no recognized chaplain and [had] generally found that it [could not] obtain the necessary ecclesiastical permission to sponsor meetings with priests as speakers within the college." This controversy was a national concern in Ireland, being even reported twice on the front page of the main Irish newspaper, "The Irish Times." This controversy subsisted even after Trinity College had its first Catholic Chancellor. There were also some other smaller controversies between the President of the Laurentian Society, Donal O'Sullivan and Archbishop John Charles McQuaid, such as one arising in The Irish Times.

On 2 March 1967, the secretary of the board of college made clear that Trinity College had long since been open to Catholics, and that offers had been made to the Catholic hierarchy to set up a school of theology within the College, to appoint a Chaplain and to have a chapel within College. On 3 April 1967, the Laurentian Society made a statement pointing out "that the controversy about the ban on Catholics attending Trinity College resulting from Hierarchial [sic] legislation had led to the assumption that the problem consisted of a conflict between the university and the Hierarchy. 'This is not the case. The problem is essentially a Catholic one." Furthermore, the society, which back then represented 880 Catholic students, stated that "Dublin University, both as constituted and functioning, does not in any way hinder the promotion of Christian activity—rather it encourages and subsidises the religiously orientated societies." It further stated: "We publicly renew our request to the appropriate ecclesiastical authorities to accept the invitation of our college, staff and students to appoint a resident chaplain and to establish a school of theology. We urge our fellow students, their parents and our pastors to consider the responsibility that is theirs to solve, the problems created by legislation." The Society continued pressing for the abolition of the "Maynooth Statutes, (the ban on Catholics attending Trinity College) and to actively support the campaign for the appointment of a Catholic chaplin [sic] to cater for Catholics attending T.C.D." In their lobbying against the Ban, the Society made submissions to different authorities

The efforts of the Laurentian Society met persistent opposition. For instance, in April 1969, answering a request made by the Dublin University Laurentian Society, the Archbishop of Dublin refused "for the fourth time in three years," to consider appointing a Catholic chaplain to Trinity College. The Archbishop did so even though at that time there were "over 1,200 Catholic [sic] in Trinity, by far the largest denomination in the college." Nevertheless, the Laurentian Society was persistent in its request. Indeed, The Irish Times records:

"Before the June meeting at Maynooth of the Irish bishops, the Laurentian Society hope to send a letter to all Irish and British bishops, quoting the Vatican II document which states that all non-Catholic universities and institutions should have a Catholic chaplain, suitably qualified to deal with the problems of students. Since this document was passed by the bishops at the Council, it is presumed that it had the consent of the Irish hierarchy. Thus we seem to have the puzzling situation whereby the Irish bishops, while agreeing with the decree, are also opposing it. Perhaps the June meeting will decide to release Trinity from its exclusive position as the only university in the world that is 'out of bounds' to Catholics."

Finally, the pressure made by the Laurentian Society gave fruits. The bishops sitting in Maynooth decided that the ban would be promptly lifted. On 28 October 1970, Archbishop McQuaid nominated Brendan Heffernan as the first Dean of Residence for Catholic students, which was the first in the history of College (Dean of Residence is the name given to various chaplains at Trinity College).

== Some activities of the society ==
=== Ordinary activities ===
The existence of this society is praised in the first number of issues of Trinity News, by saying that "[i]ts rooms in 5 Trinity College are a fine example of what can be done by a group of enthusiastic students and supporters. The rooms themselves have been furnished by contributions and are indeed modern and most comfortable." The Laurentian Society's meetings and its charitable works were sometimes covered by Trinity News.

The society held talks on different issues. For instance, on Friday 15 February 1963, the society celebrated its tenth anniversary with a public meeting at the GMB where some speakers referred to several socio-political and religious issues. It was also one of the societies involved in organising the Human Need Week, formerly Famine Relief Week, in 1970; and it organised a concert for the patients of the St. John of God Hospital, a mental home in Stillorgan. Finola Kennedy asserts that Frank Duff, the founder of the Legion of Mary, was a guest of the society.

Some of the society's ordinary events were covered by the Irish Times newspaper. Examples of these meetings were one in which Mr. J. Lynch, Minister for Education, and Mr. Declan Costello, T.D. (member of Parliament) spoke about European integration; one in which the Chief Justice Mr. Cearbhall O'Dalaigh spoke about Ireland's role as a small nation; and one in which the project of a university for Limerick was discussed, attended by Mr. G. O'Malley, chairman of Limerick Students University Project Committee, who had a controversy with Mr. Michael Adams, representative of the Union of Students in Ireland.

=== Notable campaigns and activities ===
The Laurentian Society was involved in several issues, including in relation to "the Ban". The Laurentian Society was also involved in the university reaction to the White Paper on the Irish Language of 1965, since "the public image to the rest of Trinity of the Irish-speaking student is synonymous with that of the Laurentian Society (the Catholic society) and the Gaelic football and hurling societies. Membership of these overlap, and it was said that the college Gaelic teams were chosen in the Laurentian rooms and consisted of Irish-speaking members of Cumann Gaelach. Reaction, therefore, to the Government White Paper on the Irish Language was centred on these three societies. In 1970, the Laurentian Society, together with other two societies, organised "Trinity Famine Relief Week." It was only when these three organisations started organising this week that it changed its name to "Human Needs Week".

== Relations with other societies ==
In the 1970s, the Saint Vincent de Paul Society (VDP Society) had no rooms in College, so it used the rooms that the Laurentian had in House 4. The Laurentian society was not very active at the time, so efforts were made to be more active and relevant so as to justify the holding of the rooms.

The Laurentian Society, together with those of the Irish society, and "An Cumann Gaelach", provided much of the spectators at Gaelic games on campus. Indeed, "[t]he Cumann Gaelach and the Laurentian Society provided the focal point for the Gaelic Athletic Association club in Trinity College activities".

The Laurentian Society also co-operated with many other societies in the realisation of different events. For example, on 2 November 2011, together with the University Philosophical Society's Master Class Series, it invited the American speaker Ryan Bomberger, who gave a talk about how abortion affects the African American community in the United States.

== Revival of the society ==
Between the years 2002-3 and 2010–11, the society ceased to exist, so it no longer appeared in the Dublin University Calendar. During the academic year 2010–11 a group of students tried to revive the society, but the Central Societies Committee rejected this proposal. A second attempt was made at the early beginning of academic year 2011–12, and on 12 September 2011 the society was granted provisional recognition as a cultural society, in time for Freshers' Week 2011. Since then, the Laurentian Society has been described as a "vital society" and one of the "visible pinpoints of light among younger age groups" of Irish Catholics. On 19 March 2013, the Central Societies Committee granted the society full recognition at the Annual General Meeting.

== See also ==
- List of Trinity College Dublin student organisations
