= The University Record =

The University Record may refer to:

- The former name of the newspaper of Trinity College Dublin; now known as The University Times
- The weekly newspaper of the University of Michigan
