= National Student Media Awards =

Irish student journalism competition

The National Student Media Awards or Smedias are an annual All-Ireland student journalism competition run by the Oxygen.ie website. The awards have been labelled "Ireland's premier student awards".

== History and format ==
Since 2000, Oxygen.ie, a website aimed at third-level students, has run a student journalism competition.

As of the 2020 awards, submissions were invited in a number of categories. These included Editor of the Year (previously won by UCD's University Observer), Magazine of the Year (previously won by DCU's Flux), Newspaper of the Year (including previous winners The University Times, Trinity News, and University Observer), Sports Writer of the Year (previously won by The College View), and Website of the Year (previously won by Sin.ie).

== Judges ==
Judges have included:

- Geraldine Kennedy, Editor of The Irish Times
- Ruth Scott, 2fm DJ
- Cathal Ó Searcaigh, Member of Aosdána
- Jason Sherlock, Winner of GAA GPA All Stars Awards
- Benjamin Cleary, Oscar winning filmmaker
- Paul Howard, journalist and author
