= Trinitones =

Trinity College Dublin a cappella group

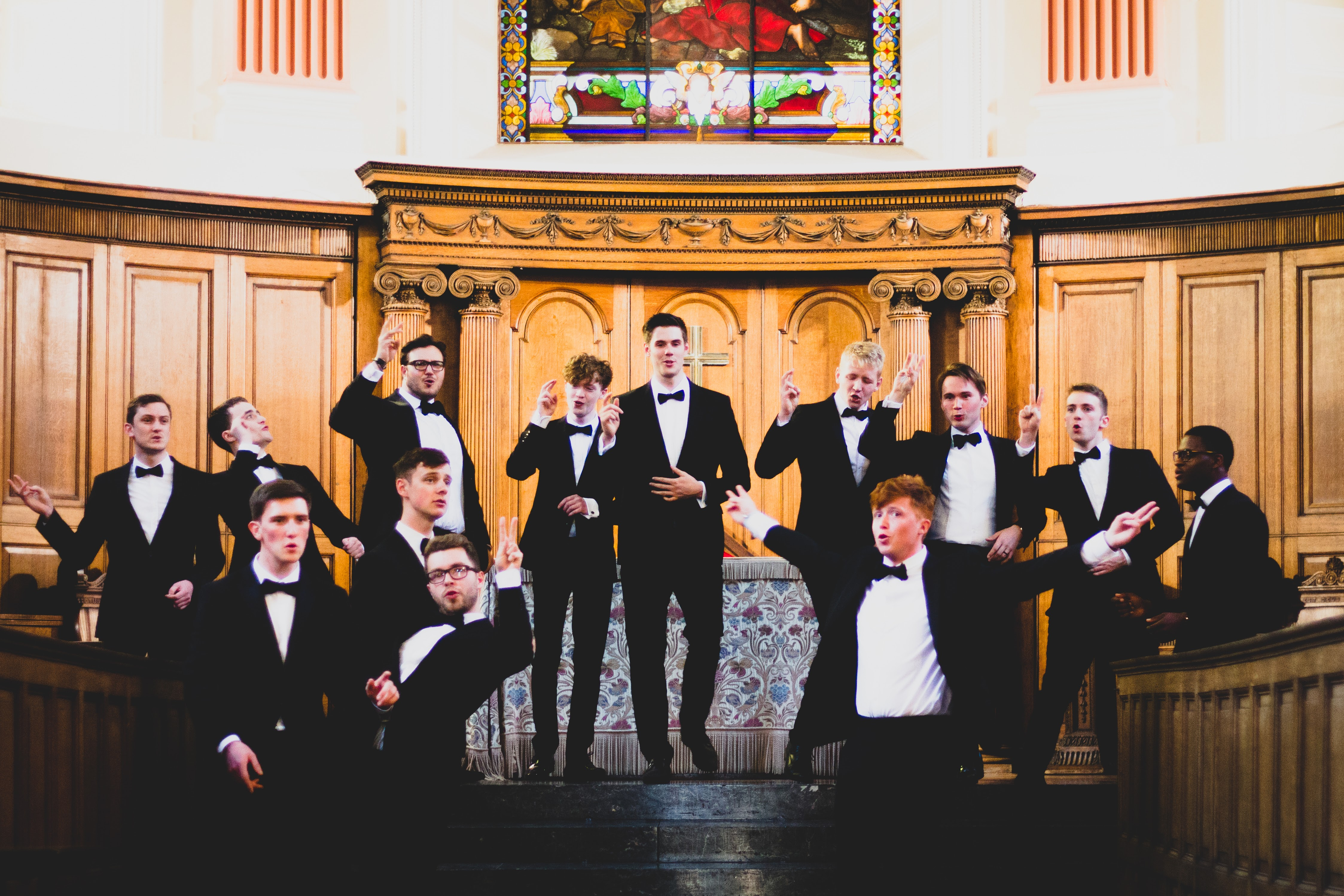
- Trinitones in June 2017

Background information
- Origin: Dublin, Ireland
- Genre: Acappella Pop
- Years active: 2012–present
- Website: www.trinitones.ie

Trinitones (/ˈtrɪnɪtoʊnz/) is an all-male a cappella ensemble from Trinity College Dublin, Ireland. Founded in 2012, the group were described as "pioneers" of the collegiate a cappella genre in Ireland in a 2013 University Times article.

In February 2013, the group released a cover of Wheatus' "Teenage Dirtbag", which achieved overnight viral success on YouTube and led to Twitter recognition from Wheatus themselves as well as performances on The Morning Show on national broadcaster TV3. Since this inaugural release, the group have gone on to produce other recordings and music videos of a cappella covers.

In terms of structure, the group resembles a small male-voice chamber choir of approximately 14 members, featuring bass, baritone, tenor and countertenor parts in addition to a vocal percussionist. Membership is open to current students of Trinity College with auditions held in Fresher's Week of the Michaelmas term.

The group have toured Ireland, the UK, Hungary, Canada, the United States, and Australia, as well as performing in Ireland. They have appeared at Electric Picnic and the Trinity Ball.

== History ==
=== Origins (2012-2013): Generation I & II ===
The group was founded by two senior sophister music education (BMusEd) students, Patrick Barrett and Lynsey Callaghan. According to Barrett, himself and Callaghan had discussed the idea when on an exchange programme in Hungary. Upon their return to Ireland, they carried out auditions, and a 14-member Trinitones had its inaugural rehearsal in late January 2012. "Gen 1" highlights include the group's first performance as part of Trinity Arts Festival, the maiden performance of the would-be viral hit, Teenage Dirtbag, and the beginning of a relationship with The King's Singers.

Barrett and Callaghan continued as directors as Trinitones entered its second year. In the same year, the group released a cover of Wheatus' Teenage Dirtbag, with the YouTube video garnering 80,000 YouTube views in the 48 hours following its release. This led to several appearances on national TV and radio, and the group's first performance at Trinity Ball.

=== Establishment (2013-2017): Generation III, IV, V, & VI ===
With Barrett and Callaghan departing from Trinitones, two new directors were elected in the shape of Ben Jacob and Daragh Kneeshaw, both of whom had been founding members of the group. Two months after taking charge, the pair had led the group to national headlines once more in performing with Scrubs star Sam Lloyd. Over the next two years, Jacob and Kneeshaw slowly built up the group's profile, and led them on two major tours, one to Derry for the Derry International Choral Festival and one to London compete in the International Championship of Collegiate A Cappella, and performed with internationally renowned musicians Glen Hansard, Imelda May and Donal Lunny. Jacob and Kneeshaw's partnership culminated in a debut performance at Electric Picnic, Ireland's largest music festival.

As the group entered its fifth year, Jacob was replaced as director by Robert Somerville. Three new music videos were released to the public. The "Generation V" group also toured to Hungary, where they performed at the Franz Liszt Academy of Music.

Kneeshaw and Somerville graduated at the end of the 2015–16 academic year, leaving Neil Dunne to take the reins as director. Events included joint concerts with the Trinity Tiger Tones of Melbourne and the Yale Whiffenpoofs, as well as an invitation to perform at the Trinity London Alumni Ball and a fifth anniversary concert that saw all previous generations perform.

In September 2017, the group embarked on a tour to Australia that included stops in Sydney and Melbourne. The group appeared on several radio programmes and featuring in a number of viral videos. The three week tour concluded with a joint performance with the Trinity Tiger Tones in the Athenaeum Theatre, Melbourne. A music video was released to commemorate the tour, a cover of Bob Dylan's I Shall Be Released.

=== Tours and "e-Stardom" (2017-2019): Generation VII & VIII ===
With Dunne leaving Trinity College after the Australian tour, Andy Keenan replaced him as director for Generation VII. In November 2017, Trinitones were invited to St. Andrew's University to perform in the annual A Cappella Christmas Concert. In February 2018, the group appeared in the audition stage of the first series of reality talent show, Ireland's Got Talent. Despite their cover of Ed Sheeran's "Shape of You" receiving a standing ovation and "Yes" votes from all four judges, including the "biggest yes of the day" from Irish entertainment manager Louis Walsh, the group were not subsequently selected to perform in the live stages of the competition.

The following month, the group extended an invite to US and Scottish a cappella groups to join them and the Trinity Belles for a "international celebration of acapella [sic.]" at the Button Factory venue in Temple Bar, Dublin. While the event, featuring the Penn Counterparts and the St. Andrew's Accidentals, was deemed to have been a success, the name of concert drew criticism. Titled "Super-Duper Number 1 Greatest of All Time A Cappella Bonanza!", the name was selected after it was voted #1 by internet trolls in an online Twitter poll. In a bargain plea with the trolls, the group agreed to proceed with the chosen name, provided the tweets in question, some of which were abusive, were removed.

In April 2018, the group's exposure grew when a live video streamed on social media platform, Facebook, went viral. The video, a cover of George Ezra's "Budapest", was shared online by free British newspaper, Metro UK, and garnered over 5 million views in the week following its release. A subsequent cover of Frank Sinatra classic "New York, New York" was also widely shared, and accumulated in the region of 15 million views. On the back of this exposure, Trinitones were once again invited on to Ireland AM to perform on a special Royal Wedding themed episode as the in house band.

In May 2018, Keenan led the group on a tour of the American North-East coast, which included stops in Montreal, Burlington, Boston, Gettysburg, Washington, D.C. and New York City. Performances on this tour included a performance at the annual Montreal "Walk to the Stone" famine commemoration for the Mayor of Montreal, Valérie Plante and Lord Mayor of Dublin Mícheál Mac Donncha, and a performance at the Ben and Jerry's factory in Vermont. In Washington, D.C., the group was invited to perform at the 50th anniversary of the assassination of Robert F. Kennedy for a sizable crowd, including Kennedy's widow, Ethel. Later that week, in New York, the group sang the American national anthem at Yankee Stadium before a baseball game between the New York Yankees and the Washington Nationals.

By September, Trinitones had returned to its traditional system of duarchy, with Evan Holland joining Keenan as director. In December, the group once again returned to St. Andrew's to perform in the university's Christmas concert, where they were described by Owleyesmagazine.com as a "worldwide hit". Later that month, the Trinity Tiger Tones returned to Dublin, where they held a collaborative concert for the third time. Generation VIII also saw the group perform for two Irish Presidents: Michael D. Higgins and Mary Robinson. In April 2019, the group released another video in the form of a cover of Sean Kingston's "Beautiful Girls", which was again widely shared and garnered millions of views on-line.

== Discography ==
=== Official music videos ===
The group has officially released eight music videos, all covers of songs first performed by other artists. Often, the solo in a music video will be taken by a director, although this is not always the case.

Song	Original Artist	Year of release	Arranger	Soloist
Teenage Dirtbag	Wheatus	2013	Daniel Cummins	Patrick Barrett Daniel Cummins Gabriel Corcoran Robbie Kitt
After the Storm	Mumford and Sons	2015	Ben Jacob	Ben Jacob
Stacy's Mom	Fountains of Wayne	2016	Luke Duffy	Richard O'Connell Fergus Grant
Ignition (Remix)	R. Kelly	2016	Daragh Kneeshaw	Daragh Kneeshaw Robert Somerville
I Shall Be Released	Bob Dylan	2017	Neil Dunne	Neil Dunne
Grace Kelly	MIKA	2020	Neil Dunne	Dahnan Spurling
Good King Wenceslas/Little Girl Blue	Nina Simone	2020	Niall Barrett	Dahnan Spurling
The Christmas Song/Sleigh Ride (ft. The Accidentals)	Nat King Cole The Ronettes	2020	Niall Barrett Patrick Kennedy Ben Steacy	Cathal Dervan Kat Cleland Paula Fiegl Johnny Mason
Merry Christmas, Darling	The Carpenters	2021	Niall Barrett	Cathal Dervan

=== Releases receiving >1 million online views ===
Song	Original Artist	Year of release	Arranger	Soloist	Views (Millions)
Budapest	George Ezra	2018	Sam White	Sam White Ranald Macky	c. 36M
New York, New York	Frank Sinatra	2018	Ranald Macky	Ranald Macky	c. 17M
Beautiful Girls/Stand By Me	Sean Kingston Ben E. King	2019	Andy Keenan	Ross Layden Billy Behan	c. 29M
Giant/Never Gonna Give You Up	Rag"n"bone Man Rick Astley	2019	Sam White	Ross Layden Cathal Dervan	c. 5M
Everybody (Backstreet's Back)/Shackles	Backstreet Boys Mary Mary	2022	Johnny Mason	Dahnan Spurling Kevin McDonnell	c. 1.1M

=== Official Recordings ===
Trinitones' first single 'Raglan Road' was released in December of 2019. This was followed by four other recordings, '7 Rings', 'Put Your Records On', 'Giant/Never Gonna Give You Up' and 'Grace Kelly', all released in 2020. An official recording of the group's viral cover 'Beautiful Girls/Stand By Me' was released in June 2022. Trinitones released 'Tonely Hearts Club', their first studio EP, in 2024. The group's first full-length album - 'Trinitones, Vol. 1' - was released in September 2025. It was preceded by the release of three singles - 'Think About Things', 'The Adults Are Talking/As It Was' and 'Everybody (Backstreet's Back)/Shackles'. Trinitones have also produced three Christmas singles. 'Good King Wenceslas/Little Girl Blue' was released in December 2020, followed by 'Merry Christmas, Darling' in December 2021 and 'Please Come Home For Christmas' in December 2023.

Extended Plays

• Live at Trinity College Chapel (2020)

• Tonely Hearts Club (2024)

Albums

• Trinitones, Vol. 1 (2025)

== Associated groups ==
St. Andrew's Accidentals — an all-female group from St. Andrew's University, Scotland, who performed in concert with Trinitones on four occasions. In December 2020, the groups collaborated to release 'The Christmas Song/Sleigh Ride', a seasonal video that was recorded during COVID-19 restrictions.

Trinity Belles — an all-female a cappella group from Trinity College Dublin, founded in 2014.

Trinity Tiger Tones — an all-male a cappella group from the University of Melbourne, who thrice performed in concert with Trinitones, twice in Dublin, in November 2016 and December 2018, and once in Melbourne in September 2017.

Yale Whiffenpoofs — an all-male a cappella group from the University of Yale, who performed in concert with Trinitones in Dublin in June 2017.
