= Marshall Porter =

Irish barrister and sportsman

Personal information
- Full name: Andrew Marshall Porter
- Born: 6 January 1874; Donnycarney, County Dublin, Ireland
- Died: 5 June 1900 (aged 26); Lindley, Orange Free State
- Batting: Right-handed
- Role: Wicket-keeper

International information
- National side: Ireland (1896)

Domestic team information
- Years: Team
- 1894–1899: Dublin University

Career statistics
Competition	First-class
Matches	4
Runs scored	87
Batting average	10.87
100s/50s	0/0
Top score	44
Balls bowled	10
Wickets	0
Bowling average	n/a
5 wickets in innings	0
10 wickets in match	0
Best bowling	0/9
Catches/stumpings	2/-
- Source: CricketArchive, 8 August 2015

Andrew Marshall Porter (6 January 1874 – 5 June 1900) was an Irish barrister who was killed in the Second Boer War while fighting for the Imperial Yeomanry. He was also a noted sportsman, representing Ireland at both cricket and field hockey.

Born at Donnycarney, Porter was the son of Andrew Marshall Porter senior (later 1st Baronet), a lawyer who was an MP for Londonderry and served variously as Ireland's Solicitor-General, Attorney-General, and Master of the Rolls, and his wife Agnes Horsburgh. The elder Porter sent his son to Harrow School, where he kept wicket for the school's cricket team and was praised by James Lillywhite, a former England captain, as a "very hard hitter". In 1892, he played in the annual match between Eton and Harrow at Lord's, which Harrow won. Despite being offered a scholarship to Oxford, Porter opted to return home to study law at Trinity College Dublin. He continued his cricket career for the Dublin University Cricket Club, and during the 1895 season, played in four matches with first-class status – against the Marylebone Cricket Club (MCC) in Dublin, against Leicestershire and Cambridge University on a brief tour of England, and then a return fixture against Cambridge University in Dublin. He played solely as a batsman (Arthur Gwynn being given the wicket-keeping duties), with his highest score being 44 against Leicestershire.

In 1896, Porter was selected to represent the Irish national team against the MCC, in a match that did not have first-class status. He scored 18 runs as Ireland won by an innings, but did not play for his country again. During the Irish winter, during which no cricket was played, Porter played hockey for the Three Rock Rovers, gaining selection for the national hockey team in 1897. After graduating from Dublin University, he was called to the Irish Bar, becoming a barrister. However, in 1900, Porter enlisted as a private in the 45th (Dublin) Company of the Imperial Yeomanry, and was sent to South Africa. In June of that year, while fighting at Ladywood (near Lindley in the Orange Free State), he was badly wounded and four days later died of wounds. Porter's death was commemorated by his father with the establishment of the Marshall Porter Memorial Prize, for classics students, as well as a stained-glass window in the Graduates Memorial Building.

== See also ==
- List of cricketers who were killed during military service
- List of Irish first-class cricketers
