= Graduates Memorial Building =

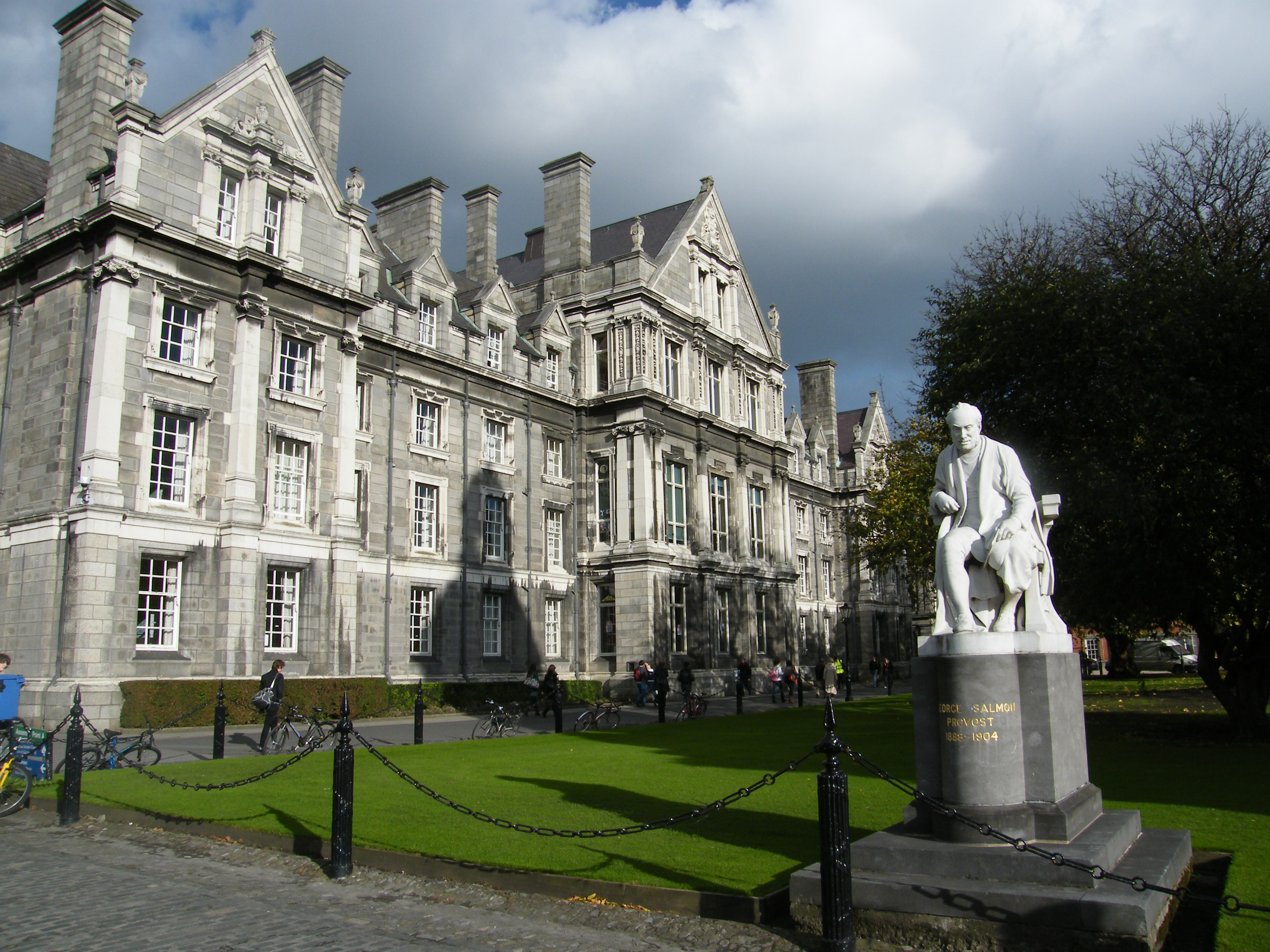

General information
- Type: Debating chamber, student society rooms and residences
- Location: Library Square; Trinity College; Dublin 2 Ireland
- Coordinates: 53.34482°N 6.256736°W
- Construction started: 1899
- Completed: 1902

Design and construction
- Architect: Sir Thomas Drew

The Graduates Memorial Building (GMB) is a neo-Gothic Victorian building, in Trinity College Dublin designed by Sir Thomas Drew in 1897. It is home to Trinity College's oldest student societies: the University Philosophical Society (the Phil), the College Historical Society (the Hist) and the College Theological Society (the Theo).

== Construction and design ==
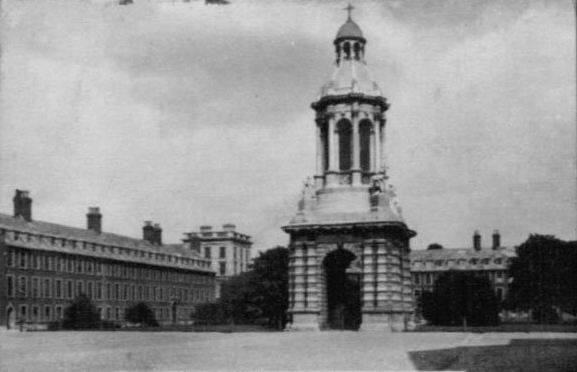
Rotten Row, to the left of the Campanile before 1899.

The Graduates Memorial Building, originally named the Graduates' Tercentenary Memorial Building, was constructed to celebrate three hundred years of Trinity College Dublin's existence.

In May 1897, tenders were invited by Trinity College Dublin, to design a replacement for the residential buildings known as Rotten Row. These buildings were almost architecturally indistinguishable from The Rubrics, which stood from circa 1700. Designs were submitted by Robert John Stirling, Thomas Newenham Deane and Sir Thomas Drew, with Drew's being selected.

The design of the building is such that it is divided into three houses: House 28, and House 30, as student residences, with House 29 in the centre of the building, being used by the societies.

In 1899 Rotten Row was demolished and work began on the new building. Its construction was largely financed by subscriptions from graduates, and was opened on 31 May 1902.

== Interior ==
The building has a vast interior, largely dedicated to debating, scholarly endeavour and use by the three societies who occupy it. It has various rooms spread over its four floors. The central foyer contains a large wooden staircase, which stretches vertically from the ground floor to the second floor.

=== Ground floor ===
The ground floor houses its Debating Chamber, frequently used by The Phil, The Hist and The Theo, specifically designed for oratory purposes, with its two-floor high ceiling, carved balcony and Ionic pilasters. On the chamber's west wall is a bronze relief of George Ferdinand Shaw former Librarian of the Phil and Senior Fellow of the college.

The conversation room of the University Philosophical Society is also on the ground floor, and provides its membership with a meeting area to sit, talk, and relax. Its conversation room also plays host to the society's paper reading sub-group, The Bram Stoker Club.

Halfway between the ground floor and first floor is the Phil's council room, which has the only access to the debating chamber's balcony.

Further up the stairs and facing onto Library Square is a large stained glass window depicting Epaminondas and Demosthenes, the greatest of all the Greek orators. It was dedicated to the memory of Marshall Porter, a university graduate killed in the Boer War.

=== First floor ===
On the first floor is the College Historical Society's conversation room, used to provide its members with a relaxed meeting place. The society also has its committee room on this floor, which has a higher ceiling and larger windows than the one below.

Trinity College tradition holds that the rooms of the society's founder Edmund Burke, were in House 28 of Rotten Row, Library square, and as such, part of the location upon which the building stands today.

The Hist Conversation Room was used as a location in the film Educating Rita.

=== Second floor ===
The second floor contains the Bram Stoker room, which hosts an office space as well as a small archival library. The room also houses the academic library and office space of the College Theological Society which is available to their members as a gesture of good faith between both societies.

Beyond a pair large doors that exit off the foyer are the buildings and two large billiards rooms, jointly owned and operated between both The Phil and The Hist.

=== Third floor ===
The third floor houses one of the college's computer rooms. Directly opposite to which is a library owned the Hist, which contains part of the societies' large collections of books and records. The upper floors of the building were damaged by a fire in December 2000, threatening the historic books and records of the societies.
