= The Rubrics =

Building in Trinity College Dublin, Ireland

- The Rubrics of Trinity College Dublin
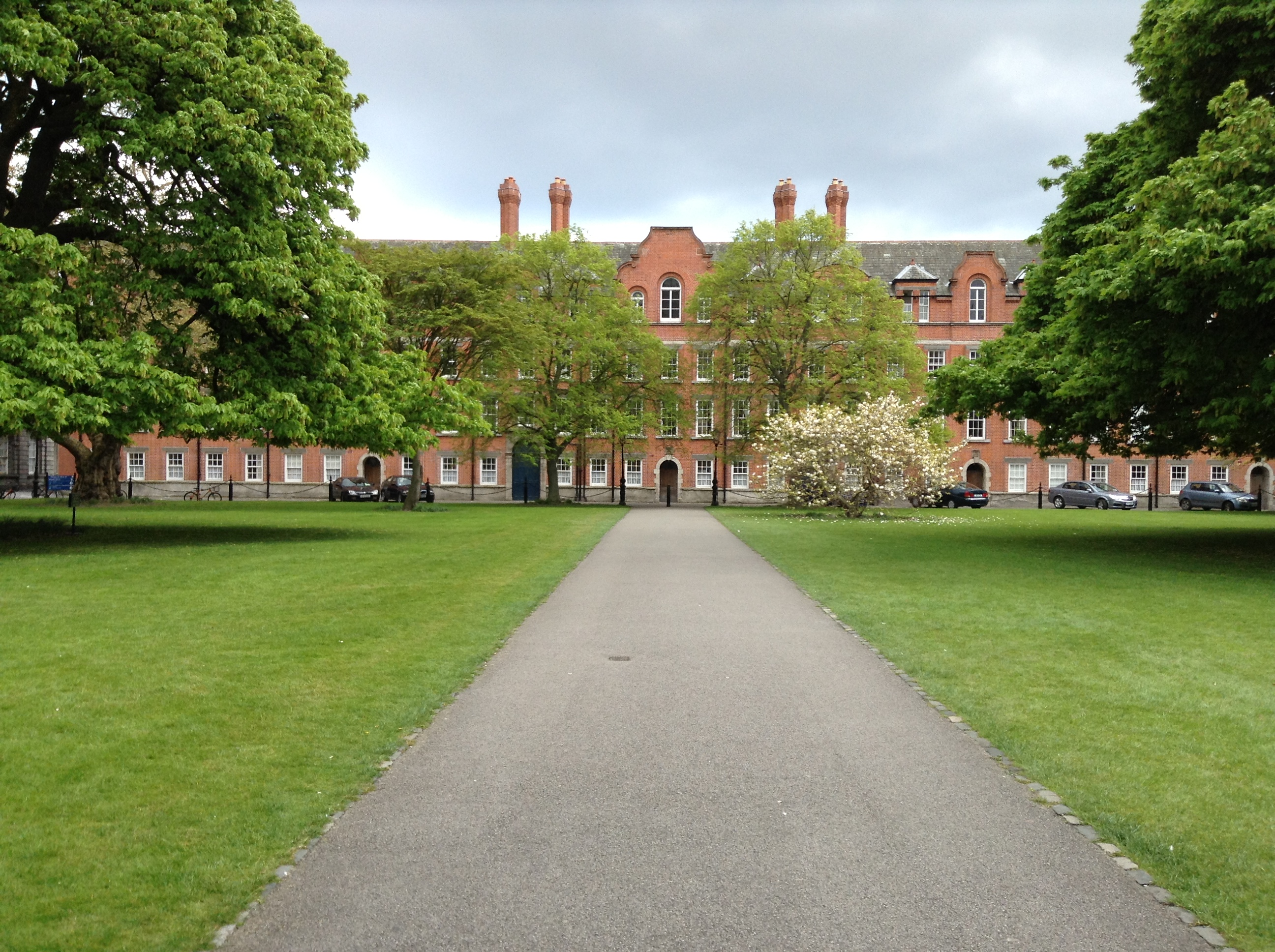
- View upon passing the Campanile.
- Interactive map of the The Rubrics area

General information
- Type: Student Residences
- Location: Library Square; Trinity College; Dublin 2 Ireland
- Coordinates: 53.3444°N 6.2562°W
- Completed: c. 1700
- Renovated: 1894

Design and construction
- Architect: Thomas Burgh

Renovating team
- Architect: Robert John Stirling

The Rubrics is the oldest building within Trinity College Dublin. Although the exact date is unknown, it was designed and built in c.1700. Today, the Rubrics are used as rooms for students and fellows.

== Construction and design ==
Originally part of a quadrangle of similar buildings, it is the only remaining building of the college's original Library Square. Those since demolished include Rotten Row, which was replaced by the Graduates Memorial Building, and another residential block which stood at the west end of the square, where the Campanile stands today. To the south is the Old Library of the college, having been begun in 1712. Constructed almost entirely from brick, with tall hexagonal chimneys, the buildings were designed as residences for the students of Trinity College.

In 1840, three bays were removed from either end of the building. Later renovation was made in 1894, by Robert John Stirling, who added an additional storey and a new brick facade and curvilinear Dutch gables.

== Murder of Edward Ford (1734) ==
The Rubrics is heavily associated with the infamous shooting and death of Edward Ford, then Fellow of the College, and son of the Archdeacon of Derry at number 25 of the building on 7 March 1734. He was strongly disliked by the undergraduate body, as he had a tendency to interfere with student matters.

On that particular evening, a boisterous group of students entered Front Gate, beating the porter stationed there, for which they earned a strong scolding from Ford. Subsequently, they went to their rooms to plot, after which they made their way to the college's New Square (known then as the Playground) after midnight to break Ford's windows. However Ford responded with a pistol and shot at the group, injuring one, and then ordered two undergraduates to summon a porter.

The students outside dispersed, returned to their rooms, acquired arms of their own, and returned to the Rubrics. A Scholar had urged Ford to remain in bed, but he refused to listen, and he went to the window in his night dress to admonish the students further. The crowd fired, and Ford received shots to the head and body. He was then moved downstairs, and a surgeon was summoned. After two hours of agony, he died and in his last words, asked that the students be forgiven.

I do not know, but God forgive them, I do.

— Edward Ford, apparent final words (when asked who'd shot him)

Four students were accused:

- James Cotter, later Baronet of Rockforest, and Member of the Irish House of Commons for Askeaton
- William Crosbie, later the 1st Earl of Glandore and Member of the Irish House of Commons for Ardfert
- Boyle, then Bachelor of Arts
- Scholes

All of whom had been drinking heavily within another part of the building (closer to the Library), where powder and a recently fired gun were found. However the trial was unable to properly determine what had transpired due to contradictory stories, evidence, and also because the Front Gate porter had been drinking, therefore unable to identify anyone. Ultimately this led to an acquittal by the court, but not by the Board, and all four were expelled.

A college tradition holds that Ford's ghost wanders the Rubrics and that "his ghost, dressed in wig, gown and knee breeches, is said to walk by the side of the Rubrics at dusk".
