= University Philosophical Society =

Student society in Trinity College Dublin, Ireland

University Philosophical Society (The Phil)
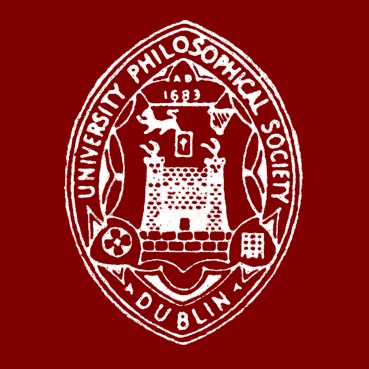
- The seal of the University Philosophical Society
- Formation: 1848
- Type: Student debating union
- Headquarters: Trinity College, Dublin, Ireland
- Location: Graduates Memorial Building, Trinity College Dublin
- Senior Patron: Linda Doyle
- Affiliations: Dublin Philosophical Society (est. 1683)
- Website: tcdphil.com

The University Philosophical Society (UPS), commonly known as The Phil, is a student paper-reading and debating society in Trinity College, Dublin, Ireland. Founded in 1848, it is the revived form of an organisation established in 1683 named Dublin Philosophical Society. It is one of the largest student societies in Ireland, and currently claims to have 10,000 active members.

The society is based within the Graduates Memorial Building of Trinity College. Throughout its history, it has welcomed many notable guests and some of its members have included Ernest Walton, John Butler Yeats, Samuel Beckett, Bram Stoker and Oscar Wilde.

== Society ==
- Society Colours

The Phil's members meet every Thursday during term to discuss a paper, debate a motion or hear an address. Traditionally a paper-reading society, meetings sometimes continue the format of responses to a paper rather than debate on a motion.

Its rooms are within the Graduates' Memorial Building (GMB) of Trinity College, which it has shared with the College Historical Society (the Hist) since the building's construction in 1902, where it provides facilities for its members such as a games and a conversation room. The Phil shares the use of its Bram Stoker Room with the College Theological Society (the Theo). It holds most of its meetings in the GMB's Debating Chamber with meetings having an expected audience of above two hundred being held in the larger lecture theatres of the college.

The society also hosts social events, internal competitions, sporting events, debating workshops and developmental competitions for members and school children.

Membership of the society is open to all Undergraduate and Postgraduate students, as well as all staff members of Trinity College. It offers four year membership to students of the university.

The society publishes "The Philander" as an annual freshers' guide to the society.

The society describes itself as the oldest debating society within the university, although the Guinness World Records recognised the College Historical Society as actually holding this record.

== History ==
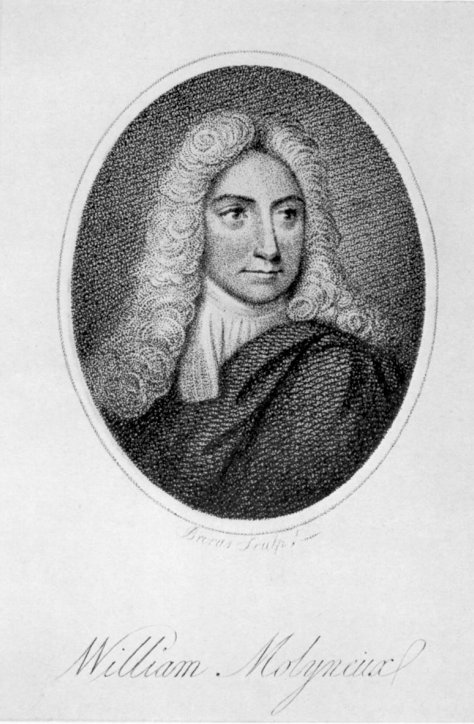
William Molyneux, founding member

The history of the University Philosophical Society spans over three centuries, several guises, identities and name changes.

=== Origins ===
In 1683, natural philosopher and political writer William Molyneux (b. 1656) founded the Dublin Philosophical Society, with the assistance of his brother Sir Thomas Molyneux and future Provost St George Ashe. They intended it to be the equivalent of the Royal Society in London (with which it maintained cultural ties) as well as the Philosophical Society at the University of Oxford. The society was traditionally a paper reading society; however it also included many demonstrations of the latest science and mathematical endeavour of that era. The first meeting on 15 October 1683 was in the Provost's lodgings at Trinity College Dublin, a location where members continued to meet.

Sometime after December 1683, Provost Robert Huntington became the society's first Senior Patron, promising protection and assistance, a role the Provost of Trinity College still holds. While at the time no particular precedent existed for Trinity College to recognise it, it can be considered the college's first such society.

On 1 November 1684 William Petty was elected as the first President of the society, and William Molyneux elected as its first Secretary. The current numbering takes this as the first session of the University Philosophical Society.

=== Reformation in the 19th century ===
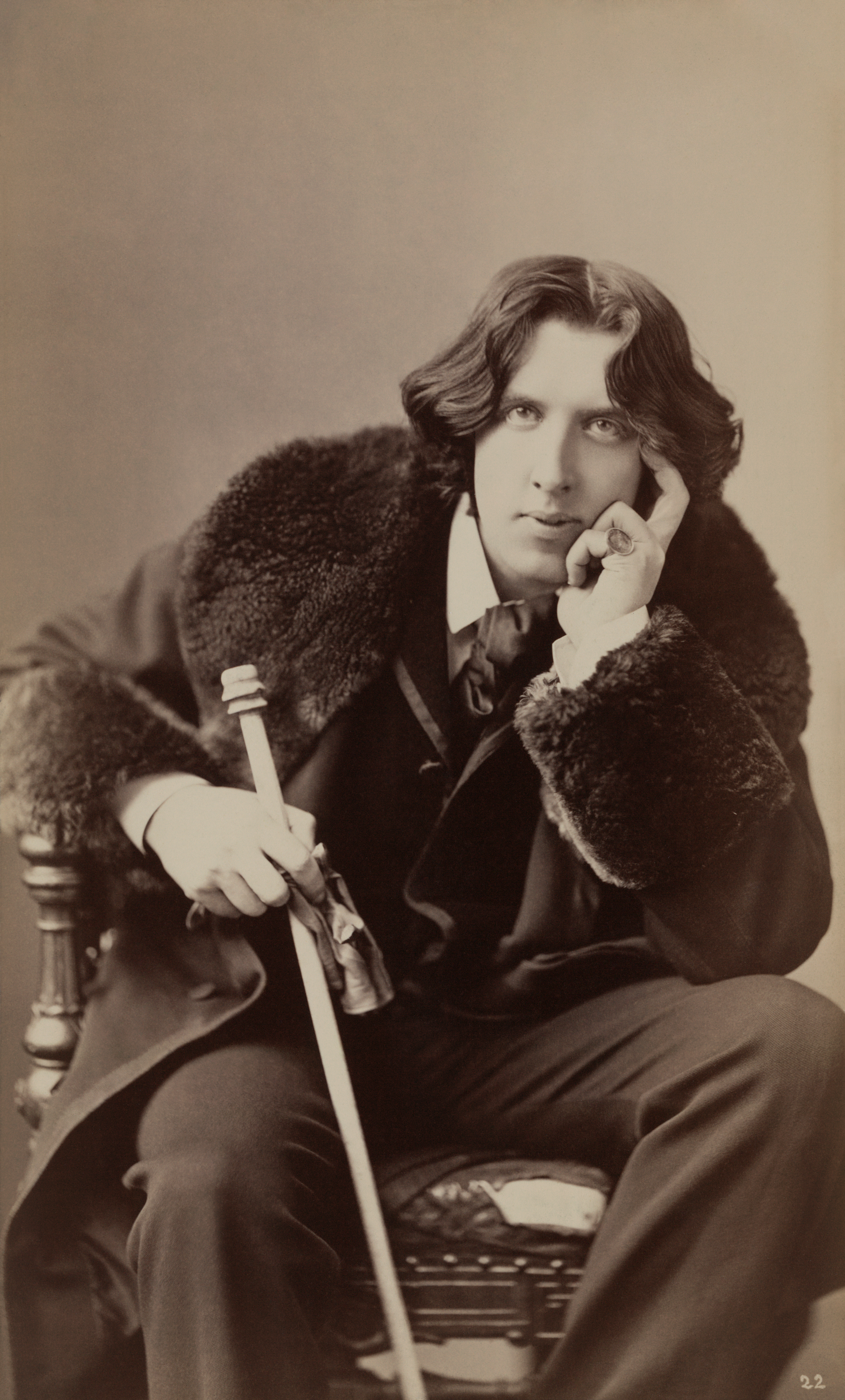
Oscar Wilde, member of the society in the 19th century

In November 1842, to mark the original session date the Dublin Philosophical Society was fully reformed under its original name, traditionally meeting on Mondays, to cater for those Trinity College students too young to join other societies in Dublin. The first meeting took place in Marlborough Street.

At the time, undergraduates were not allowed to join most College societies, such as the College Historical Society. It then became the Dublin University Philosophical Society in February 1843 when it was recognized by the college, with then Provost Franc Sadleir reassuming the traditional role of Senior Patron.

During this time the society had its rooms in No. 4 (now House 4) in Parliament Square with larger meetings taking place within the Examination Hall.

In 1860, the Dublin University Philosophical Society changed its name to the University Philosophical Society. The society claims to be the oldest, student, paper-reading, and collegial society in the world. As of the 1960s, the society still dated its foundation back to 1853, describing the 1969 session as its "116th". The current numbering of sessions emphasises the societies’ historical connection to the Dublin Philosophical Society, and treats the foundation of The University Philosophical Society as a reinstatement of that society, rather than the foundation of a new society.

Among the notable events held was the demonstration of an early telephone by Stephen Yeates in 1865.

=== 20th century ===
The society suffered greatly, with the rest of Trinity College during the First World War. Ireland was still part of the British Empire during the outbreak of the war and so many Irish enlisted. However, there was a diverse mixture between members who predominantly described as being part of the Protestant Ascendancy and those who believed more in Irish republicanism.

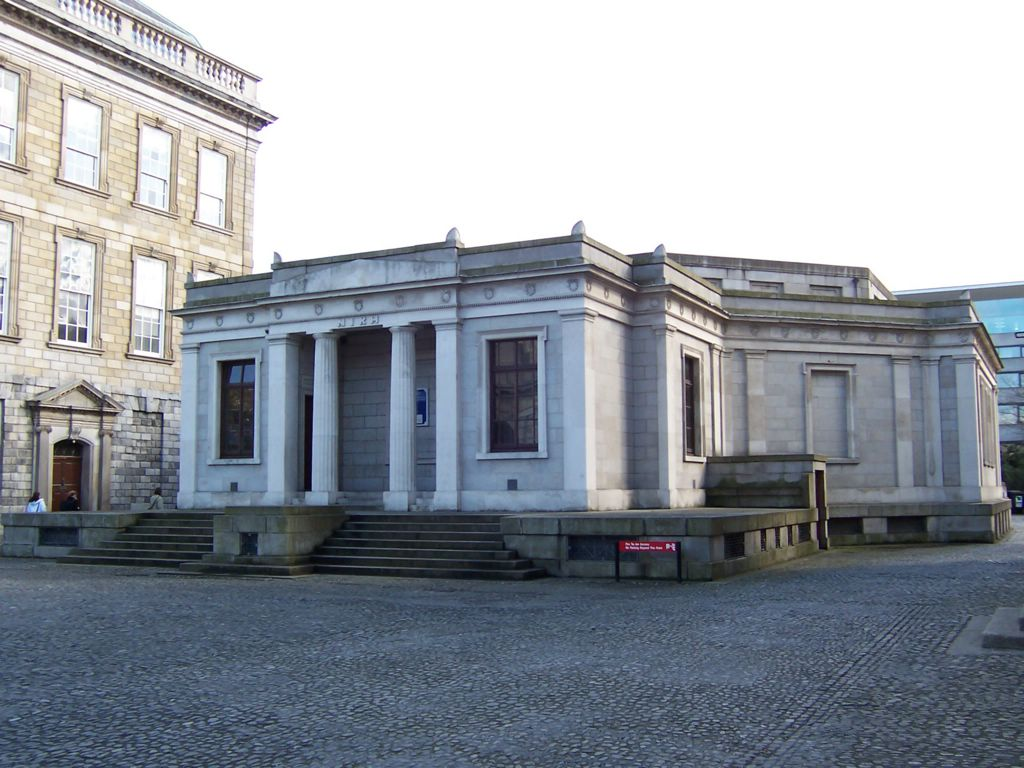
The 1937 Reading Room, a memorial to members of the college who died during the First World War

The meetings and overall strength of the society was massively diminished during the period, with there being no Inaugural Meeting from 1913 until 1919 after the end of the war.

From 1913 to 1916 ten officers of the society resigned their positions to enlist. Minutes from the time mention that many more members of the society would go on to enlist, however their names went unrecorded.

In 1919 the names of eight past officers and members of council of the society who had been killed during the war was read aloud at the Opening Meeting.

- James Austin, President 1913–1914.
- AEL West, President 1915–1916.
- Reverend Everard Digges La Touche, Secretary 1907–1908.
- JHF Leland, Treasurer 1909–1910.
- Walter Osborne Varian, Treasurer 1915–1916.
- JS West, Registrar 1914–1915.
- Francis George McGibney, Member of Council 1912–1913.
- William Kee, Member of Council 1914–1915.

Of them and those other members who gave up their lives, we can only say that while the University Philosophical Society stands they shall not be forgotten, since such men, by their deaths, have conferred on their Society, and on all connected with them, an honour that does not fade.

— Society Records, extract from the first Opening meeting of the Society in 1919.

The Irish War of Independence began shortly after the beginning of 1919, public and political will to remember those lost during the war was weak. This meant that the names of many more members of the society who were also killed during the First World War went unrecorded by the society.

The Second World War, had a lesser effect on the society, though one notable President of the early 1940s was lawyer, Nigerian independence activist and Supreme Court Chief Justice Udo Udoma.

In 1953, the society held a centenary celebration, commemorating its "First Hundred Years".

=== Dublin University Elizabethan Society ("The Eliz") ===
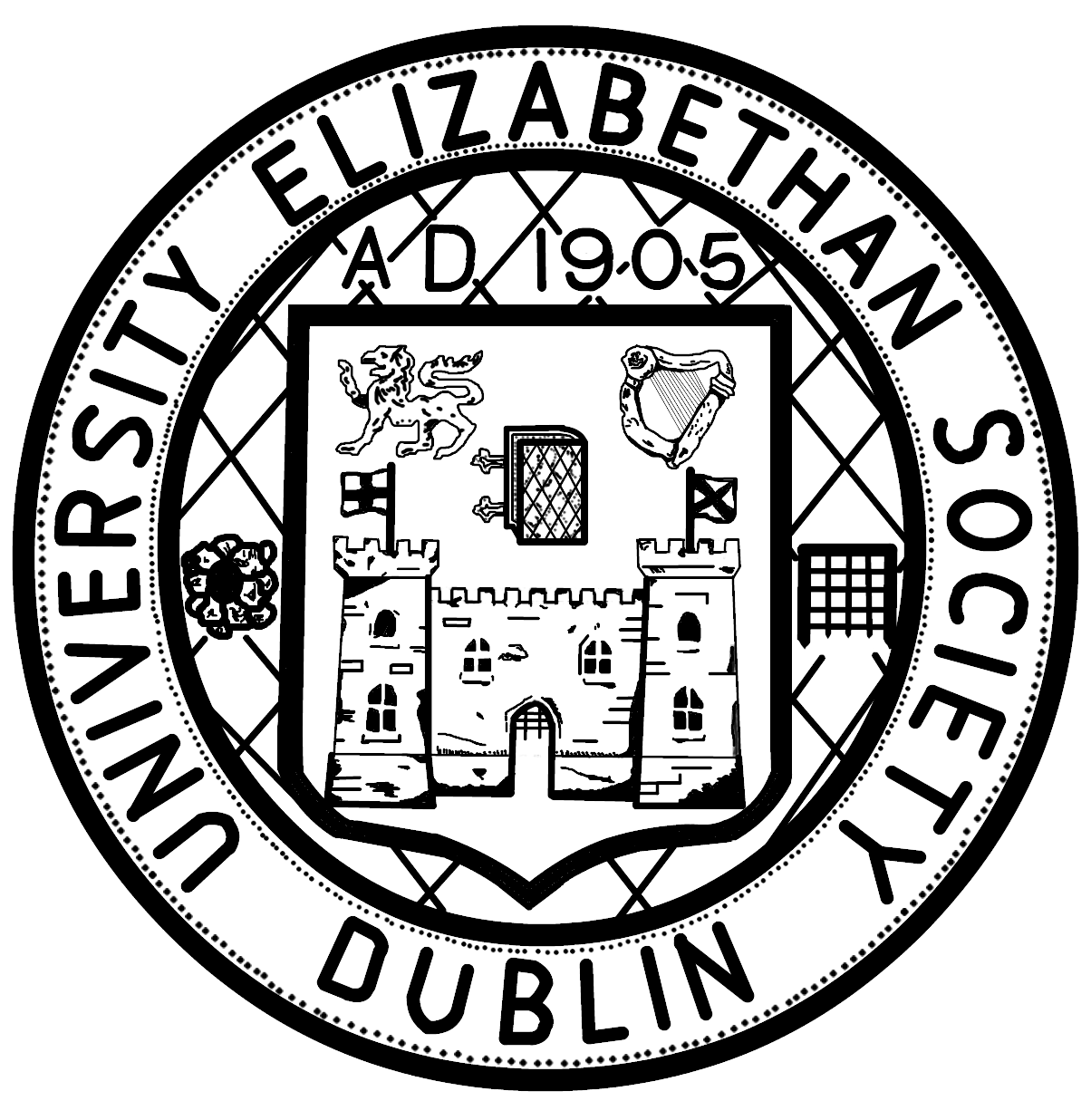
Seal of the Dublin University Elizabethan Society

The first female students were admitted to the college in 1904; however, they were unable to join any of the student societies that existed at the time. In response to this, the Dublin University Elizabethan Society (more commonly known as The Liz and later, The Eliz) was founded in 1905 by the first woman student of the university Isabel Marion Weir Johnston. The society was a female-only debating society, having sent teams to the Irish Times National Debating Championship from relatively early in the competition's history. It also hosted many debates, paper discussions, group discussions and the Eliz Garden Party (within Fellow's Square), considered one of the social highlights of Trinity term in the college. Each year the society welcomed esteemed guests to speak on topics regarding the history, the societal limitations of women, and feminism. These included such guests as Ninette de Valois, dancer and founder of The Royal Ballet, who visited in late 1964 to celebrate the society's 60th year.

The society had its rooms in House 6 in Parliament Square, housing many amenities for female students within the college, including one of only a handful of female toilets on the campus.

Over the years there were numerous debates within both the University Philosophical Society and the Dublin University Elizabethan Society regarding a merger of both societies into one. There was strong individual opposition within both societies however, with a vote in 1968 by the Eliz rejecting a merger. However, in 1981 the Dublin University Elizabethan Society merged with the University Philosophical Society, which vastly increased female membership and increased debating within the society.

Previously, the highest ranking female officer of the Phil was accorded the honorary title of President of the Elizabethan Society as a symbolic gesture but beginning in 2024, elections were held to elect the Chair of the 119th session.

==== Inclusion of women ====
In Trinity News’ edition of 25 November 1953, an anonymous female contributor declared that "The bar to the admission of women to [the other] major societies ...is a real deprivation to everyone––to College women, to the members of the societies, themselves and, most important, to the University". The 1953/54 session of the Phil made long-overdue advances in gender equality. Women were at last allowed to attend public business meetings and to speak at them, provided that Standing Orders were suspended. At the end of that session, membership was opened up to women. This final breakthrough proved short-lived as the College Board voted down female membership in early 1955 for that year – although it had no direct constitutional jurisdiction in this matter – pending possible reorganisation of the Major Societies. Although it was perhaps an understandable decision from the Board's point of view, the Board never subsequently enacted such restructuring. At periodic intervals, mergers were suggested between the Phil and the Hist; the Phil and the Eliz; and the Phil, the Student Representative Council (SRC), and the Eliz. Nothing ever came of these proposed mergers and the Phil and Hist remain separate entities. Due to a number of factors, including divisions between the various factions, the college never addressed this issue, nor did they address the creation of student union-type facilities, as are commonplace in the debating unions of other institutes of higher education.

It was not until the 1963/64 session that a further vote was taken by the Phil on the admission of women, although it was lost by only three votes. However, some advances were made: from that session onwards, it was agreed that women could reply to papers read to the Society. In 1965, Joanna Walmsley became the first woman to present a paper to the society, entitled "Tolstoy––Realist or Moralist?". One of concerns raised over the years had been that the Society's facilities were generally inadequate for a larger mixed membership. In session 1967/1968. opposition caused then-President of the Phil Gordon Ledbetter to resign over the issue. At the first Council meeting and a subsequent private business meeting in the following session (1967/68), this concern again featured prominently. Many in the Phil also felt that the way forward could be achieved by revisiting the idea of a merger with the Eliz to form a Major Society. However, regardless of the issue of finding satisfactory accommodation for such a body, the Eliz still were not sufficiently interested in such a proposal.

In subsequent years the existing compromise with regard to female participation was found to be unsatisfactory within the active membership. A motion calling for women to be admitted as full members was proposed and debated at a private business meeting on 30 November 1967 and was passed. President of the Phil Geoff Goolnik remarked that restrictions on female membership had in actuality been a matter of convention, as gender had never been mentioned in the Laws of the Society, unlike those of the Eliz and the Hist.

At the following private business meeting held on the 5th of December, three women were proposed and voted in as members, including President of the Eliz Elizabeth Hall. Hall was nominated by Goolnik and the motion was seconded by Auditor of the Hist ‘Gully’ Stanford in his capacity as an Ordinary Member of the Phil. Gráinne Monks was the first female member to address the society after the full inclusion of women, and she was elected the first female Member of Council in February 1968.

=== 21st century ===
Today the University Philosophical Society is one of the largest student societies within the college and in Ireland. Its meetings include weekly paper readings and debates. Additionally it invites many internationally esteemed guests to address the society each year, including such public figures as Al Pacino, Joe Biden, Bernie Sanders, and Stephen Fry

== Governance ==
The Phil is governed by a Council elected by the members of the society each year. There are nine officers: President, Secretary, Treasurer, Registrar, Debates Convenor, Librarian, Steward, Schools Convenor, and Auteur. All officers are directly elected. In addition to the officers there are fifteen Members of Council. The Members of Council serve as deputies to the officers, aid in the execution of their responsibilities, and perform any other such work necessary for the efficient running of the society. Seven are directly elected each year. One of these seven is then selected by the council to serve as Vice President of the society. The Senior Member of Council is also elected in the same manner as the officers of the society and is delegated the responsibility of co-ordinating the other Members of Council. The newly elected Council may then add up to seven further Members of Council via co-option.

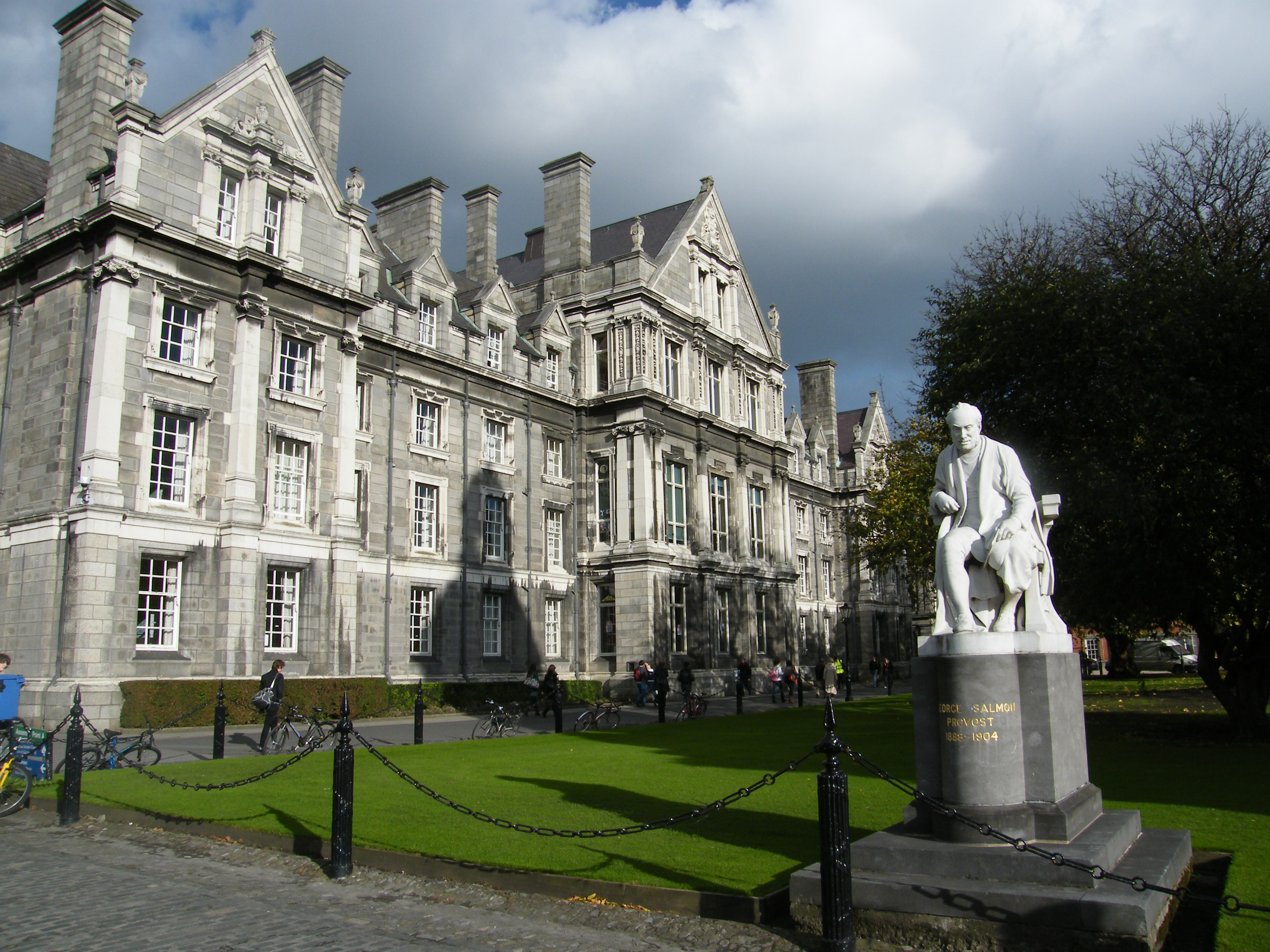
The Graduates Memorial Building (G.M.B.) home to the University Philosophical Society since the beginning of the 20th century.

== Bram Stoker Club ==
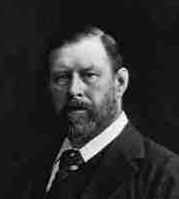
Bram Stoker, former President of the Society, who presented "Sensationalism in Fiction and Society" as his first paper

In addition to its usual events, the society added a subcommittee, the Bram Stoker Club (more commonly known as Bram), to its organisation in 2011. Named after one of the Phil's most illustrious presidents (Bram Stoker), the club holds weekly afternoon paper-readings on a range of topics. These paper-readings have served to carry on the long tradition of the society, which had fallen slightly out of fashion in recent years.

In January 2013, the club was incorporated into the official laws of the University Philosophical Society by majority vote. This was then officially recognised by the Dublin University Central Societies Committee in March of the same year.

It had its first foray outside of college in 2013, entering the winning team of John Engle and Liam Brophy in that year's Irish Times National Debating Championship.

During the 4th Session, the club welcomed three living descendants of its namesake Bram Stoker. Noel Dobbs, Robin MacCaw and Dacre Stoker met with members of the club and society at large. Each presented papers on the history of Bram Stoker and legacy of Dracula within their family. Also in attendance was distant relative and Senator David Norris. Finally, the Stoker family presented the club with portrait of Bram Stoker by Dublin artist Damian Byrne and a plaque specifying the connection between the society and their ancestor.

== Competitive debating ==
=== External debating competitions ===
The society has a presence on the competitive debating circuit. Having first won the Irish Times National Debating Championship in 1961 the society has gone on to win and place in several other well known debating competitions. These include the John Smith Memorial Mace, World Universities Debating Championship, Irish National Law Debates, Cork IV and the UCD Vice Presidents' Cup IV. In 2022, Dylan McCarthy and Jack Palmer from the Phil won the European Universities Debating Championships in Zagreb, becoming the second Irish team to win the championships and the first from Trinity.

=== Internal debating competitions ===
The society runs several internal debating competitions each year. These consist of:

- The Eamon O'Coine Memorial Maiden Speaker's Competition (or "Maidens"); for first-time speakers in college.
- The Jeremy Clarkson Memorial Debating Competition (or "Clarkies"), consisting of a series of regular weekly debates.; satirically named after TV presenter Jeremy Clarkson. Formerly known as The Maggies, after former Prime Minister of the United Kingdom Margaret Thatcher
- The Elizabethan Society Memorial Pro-Am Competition (or "Lizzies"); a competition whereby experienced debaters (Pros) are teamed with less experienced speakers (Ams).
- The Isabel Marion Weir Johnston Memorial (or "Izzy's"); is an internal competition for all members of the society. It is named in honour of the first woman to enter Trinity where she went on to found the Elizabethan Society which later merged with the Philosophical Society.
- The J.P Mahaffy Memorial (or "Mahaffy's"); named after former President of the society John Pentland Mahaffy internal debating competition for Junior Freshman ("fresher") teams of two.

=== Trinity Intervarsity ===
Each year, normally in January, the society jointly with the Hist hosts the Claire Stewart Trinity IV. Before 2015 this consisted of the Trinity Invitational and the Dean Swift Intervarsity. In 2015, the Trinity Invitational was replaced with Trinity Women's Debating Competition.

== Phil Speaks ==
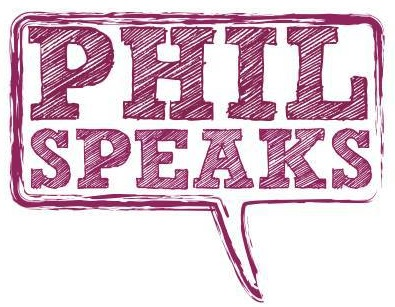
Phil Speaks Logo

The 'Phil Speaks Debating and Public Speaking Initiative', commonly known as 'Phil Speaks', is a campaign aimed at promoting, as well as developing skills in public speaking and oratory. Formed by the society in 2004 the initiative combines in-school oratory workshops, with Pro–Am (Professional-Amateur) learning competitions to encourage these skills in students of all secondary schools throughout Ireland.

At the end of the contest, the society hosts the Phil Speaks Competitive Weekend modelled on the format of a University Intervarsity Competition held within the Graduates Memorial Building, with the grand final taking place in the Debating Chamber.

== Awards ==
Annually, the society internally awards the author of the best paper and the best chamber speaker from its membership, medals of oratory and composition. The society also awards the Gold Medal of Honorary Patronage and the Bram Stoker Medal to various guests each year.

Among the awards received by the society are awards from the internal Central Societies Committee of Trinity College, including the "best event" award for 'This House Believes that Society is Failing People with Disabilities' in 2019 and "best large society" in 2015.

== Honorary patrons ==
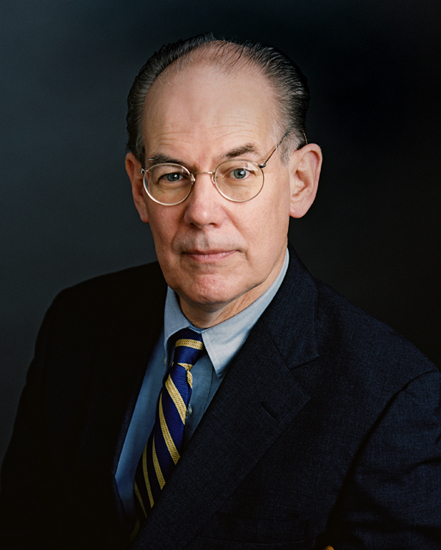
John Mearsheimer, awarded the Honorary Patronage in 2012.

Through its years in college, the Society has recorded the presence of many notable guests, the most distinguished of whom are named honorary patrons of the society. Included amongst these are multiple Nobel Prize laureates, both before and after their receipt of the Prize, such as W. B. Yeats, Heads of State and of Government, notable actors and musicians, as well as well-known intellectuals. Guests have also included all Taoisigh since Charles Haughey.

The honorary patrons for the 340th session were, comedian Stephen Colbert, fashion designer Jonathan Anderson, writer Jia Tolentino, comedian Nish Kumar, and journalist Ash Sarkar, among others.

== Controversies ==
In 2011, the Phil encountered controversy when it invited BNP leader Nick Griffin to speak at a Thursday night debate on immigration. After raging protests, talks with college officials and physical threats made to the members and council the invitation was reluctantly withdrawn by the President of the 327th session, Eoin O'Liathain. In a press statement the Phil said that "it is unfortunate that circumstances have arisen under which the planned debate can no longer go ahead without compromising the safety of staff and students". Despite these challenges the session would go on to be voted Best Society in Trinity College that year.

In 2015, members of the Phil were asked by the President to collect copies of The University Times after the newspaper printed details of confidential correspondence that had been supplied to the newspaper in the understanding that it would not be referred to in an article. While The University Times subsequently agreed to withdraw the edition of the paper in question from circulation, after their breach of journalistic standards, Trinity News falsely reported that members of council had discussed calling a motion to impeach the president as a result of the society's actions in collecting the newspapers. A motion of confidence in the president was later passed at a general meeting of the society. The incident was cited as one of the factors leading to Samuel Riggs, then the editor of The University Times, agreeing to take a permanent leave of absence from his position as well as the resignation of two senior Trinity News editors.

== Notable members ==
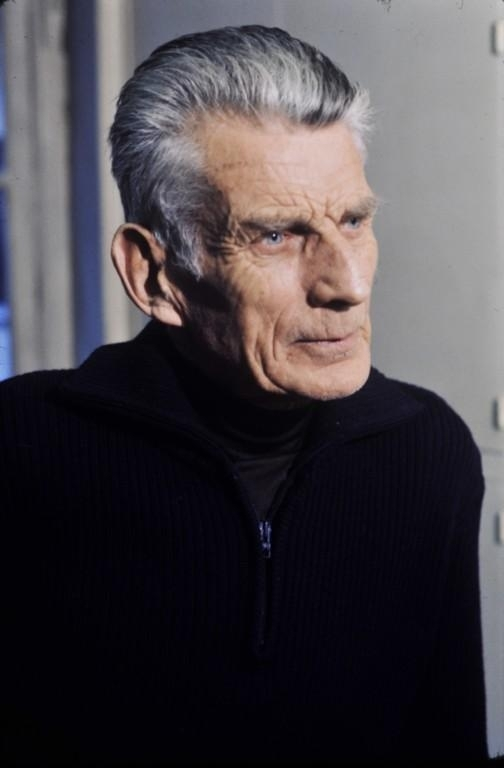
Samuel Beckett, former member of the society

=== Academia ===
- Robert Stawell Ball, ex-Sch., Royal Astronomer of Ireland and Lowndean Professor of Astronomy and Geometry at the University of Cambridge. President, 1860–61.
- Valentine Ball, geologist. Treasurer, 1863–64.
- J.B. Bury, ex-Sch., historian, classicist, Byzantinist and philologist.
- George Coffey, scholar of Irish history and cultural revivalist. President, 1880–81.
- William Macneile Dixon, British academic and author, Regius Professor of English Language and Literature, Glasgow. President, 1889–90, Librarian, 1888–89.
- Mervyn A. Ellison, ex-Sch., astronomer and authority on solar flares. President, 1931–32, Treasurer, 1930–31.
- William Hugh Ferrar, classical scholar. Treasurer, 1855–56.
- John Pentland Mahaffy, ex-Sch., classicist and polymath scholar. President, 1858–59.
- Vincent Arthur Smith, Indologist, historian and member of the Imperial Civil Service. President, 1868–69.
- W. J. M. Starkie, Greek scholar.
- William Stokes, doctor and professor of surgery.
- John Lighton Synge, mathematician and physicist. Treasurer, 1917–18.
- Ernest Walton, ex-Sch., physicist and Nobel Laureate. Member of Council, 1925–26.
- Trevor West, Sch., mathematician and Senator. Treasurer, 1959–60, Registrar, 1958–59.
- William Wilde, Irish otolaryngologist and ophthalmologist and polymath, father of Oscar Wilde, member
- Bertram Windle, British anatomist, archaeologist, scientist and writer. Librarian, 1877–78.

=== Arts ===
- Norman Rodway, ex-Sch., actor.
- John Butler Yeats, artist and father of William Butler Yeats.

=== Broadcasting and Journalism ===
- Daire Brehan, Irish broadcaster, barrister and actress. Secretary, 1976–77.
- Sarah Carey, columnist and broadcaster. Registrar, 1991–92.
- Ken Early, journalist and sports broadcaster. Steward, 1998–99.
- Alex Massie, prominent Scottish journalist. Steward, 1996–97.

=== Law ===
- James Campbell, 1st Baron Glenavy, Lord Chancellor of Ireland, Attorney-General for Ireland, Solicitor-General for Ireland, Member of Parliament and later first Chairman of the Free State Senate.
- Richard Cherry, Attorney-General for Ireland and Liberal MP. Secretary, 1879–80.
- Gerald Fitzgibbon, ex-Sch., Solicitor-General for Ireland, 1877–78 and Lord Justice of Appeal. Secretary, 1857–58.
- Jonathan Pim (1858-1949), Solicitor-General for Ireland, Attorney-General for Ireland and Lord Justice of Ireland in the aftermath of the Easter Rising. President, 1883–84, Secretary, 1882–83, Librarian, 1881–82.
- Udo Udoma, former Justice of the Nigerian Supreme Court, former Chief Justice of Uganda. President, 1942–43, Secretary, 1941–42, Librarian, 1940–41.

=== Literature ===
- Edmund John Armstrong, poet. President, 1864–65.
- Samuel Beckett, ex-Sch., dramatist and poet, Nobel Laureate.
- Kate Cruise O'Brien, author.
- Edward Dowden, poet and critic. President, 1862–63, Secretary, 1861–62.
- Standish James O'Grady, author, journalist and historian. Secretary, 1866–67.
- Bram Stoker, novelist and short story writer. President, 1868–69, Secretary, 1867–68.
- Oscar Wilde, author, playwright and poet.
- Gabriel Fielding, author and poet. Nom de plume of Dr Alan Barnsley 1935–1939. Winner Silver Medal in Oratory 1939.

=== Nobility ===
- Charles Austin Thomas Robert John Joseph ffrench, 6th Baron ffrench, 1868–1955. Deputy Lieutenant of County Galway.
- Charles Edward MacDermot, The Mac Dermot, Prince of Coolavin, 1904–47. Registrar, 1883–84. His son and successor, Charles John MacDermot (Prince of Coolavin, 1947–79), was also a member.
- Martin Morris, 2nd Baron Killanin, Conservative peer. Secretary, 1888–89.

=== Politics and government ===
- Gerald Brunskill, Unionist MP. Treasurer, 1887–88, Registrar, 1886–87.
- Nessa Childers, Member of European Parliament. Registrar, 1977–78, SMC 1976–77.
- Paschal Donohoe TD, Minister for Public Expenditure, Infrastructure, Public Service Reform and Digitalisation. Secretary, 1993–94.
- Cecil Harmsworth, 1st Baron Harmsworth, Liberal MP, businessman and brother of press barons Lord Northcliffe and Lord Rothermere. Registrar, 1889–90.
- Caesar Litton Falkiner, Unionist MP. President, 1885–86, Treasurer, 1884–85, Librarian, 1883–84.
- George Noble Plunkett, anti-treaty republican, member of the First Dáil and Ireland's first Minister for Foreign Affairs, 1919–21.
- James Wallace Quinton, chief commissioner of Assam from 1889 until his murder by rebels in Manipur in 1891. President, 1855–56, Secretary, 1854–55.
- Robert Rowlette, TD, Senator and doctor. Secretary, 1895–96.

=== Religion ===
- Hugh Dunlop Brown, President of the Irish Baptist Association, theologian and prominent unionist.
- John Baptist Crozier, Anglican bishop. President, 1874–75, Secretary, 1873–4, Treasurer, 1872–73.
- Ralph Creed Meredith, chaplain to King George VI and Queen Elizabeth II. President, 1910–11, Secretary, 1909–10.
- Charles D'Arcy, ex-Sch., Anglican bishop. Treasurer, 1883–84.
- James Walsh, Dean of Christ Church Cathedral, Dublin, 1908–18.
