= Campanile (Trinity College Dublin) =

Bell tower in Dublin, Ireland

Campanile of Trinity College Dublin
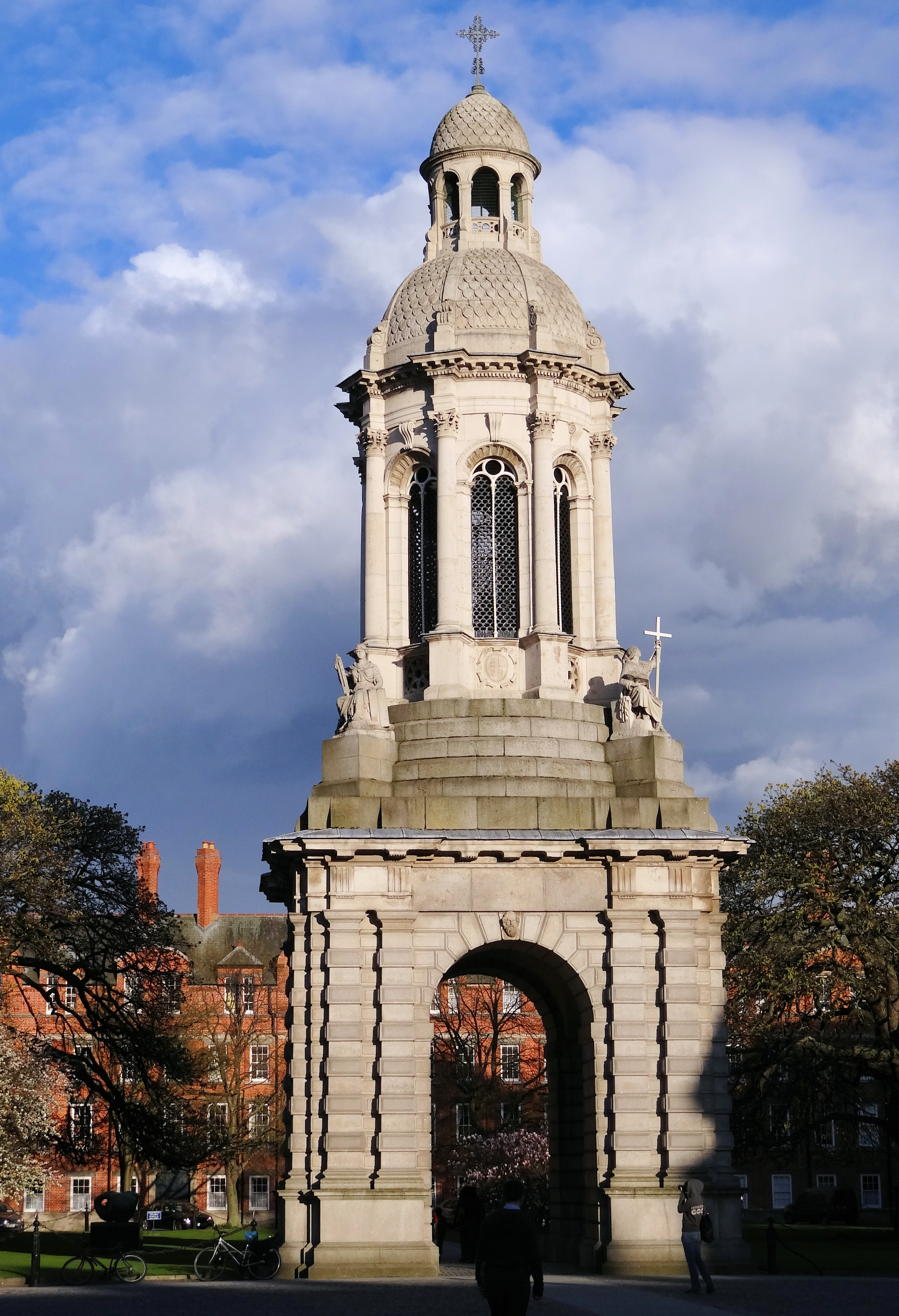
- View upon entering Trinity College.

General information
- Type: Bell Tower
- Location: Library Square; Trinity College; Dublin 2 Ireland
- Coordinates: 53.34439961°N 6.25731468°W
- Groundbreaking: 1 December 1852
- Completed: 1854 (172 years ago)
- Cost: £3,500

Height
- Height: 30.5 m (100 ft)

Design and construction
- Architect: Sir Charles Lanyon
- Other designers: Thomas Kirk
- Main contractor: Henry Kingsmill

The Campanile of Trinity College Dublin is a bell tower and one of its most iconic landmarks. Donated by then Archbishop of Armagh, Lord John Beresford it was designed by Sir Charles Lanyon, sculpted by Thomas Kirk and finished in 1854.

== History ==
It is the most recent bell tower in a line dating back to the original tower of the monastery of All Hallows. It replaced a campanile built to the design of Richard Castle between 1740-46. The top part of the belfry was ultimately removed around 1791 as it was deemed structurally unsafe with the remainder being demolished in 1798. The foundation stone of the current campanile was laid on 1 December 1852.

It is located in what is considered the middle of Trinity College, however its actual location is in the northwest of college (the actual middle being the Museum Building). At the central axis of the college's Library Square, to the north is the Graduates Memorial Building, south the college's Old Library, east The Rubrics, to the west Trinity College's Front Gate and Regent House.

== Design ==
The entire structure stands at 30.5 metres (100 ft) tall and is mainly granite in composition with its carvings being of portland stone. Lanyon had originally intended the campanile to be linked to the buildings on either side (Old Library and those on the site of the Graduates Memorial Building) by an "arcaded screen", however this was never realised.

Patrick Wyse Jackson, curator of the Geological Museum at Trinity, assessed the Campanile in 1993:

"The Campanile between Parliament Square and Library Square houses the Great Bell of Trinity, which is rung before the conferring of degrees. It also tolls prior to examinations! This bell weighs thirty-seven hundredweight and cannot be swung in the belfry as it is too large. It is rung by chiming instead. The lower portion of the Campanile is composed of a fine-grained bluish granite from Blessington, County Wicklow, while the upper cupola is made of Portland Stone."

=== Base ===
The base has paired rusticated Doric pilasters with portland entablature blocks. Between each pillar of the base are four round-headed arches, and each archway has a keystone. These keystones each have detailed carved heads, which depict Homer, Socrates, Plato and Demosthenes - representing the liberal arts.

Before the belfry, is a stepped circular base made of granite. At the corners of the campanile, seated and supported by this circular base are the Higher Faculties represented in four deceptive figures of Divinity, Science, Medicine and Law sculpted from portland stone by Irish sculptor Thomas Kirk.

=== Belfry ===
The belfry is a cylindrical chamber encircled by Corinthian columns, between which are tall, round-head traceried windows with cast iron grills.

The base of the belfry also has four carved coats of arms at each side, almost directly above the carved keystone faces below. Each coat of arms faces out onto a prominent location in the college, and symbolize strong connections it had with external forces.

These four coats of arms are those of:

- Royal coat of arms of the United Kingdom, from 1837. It faces onto Parliament Square.
- Trinity College Dublin, though a 19th-century variant, with the Lion Passant Guardian rather than simply Passant and the Castle towers are Flamant rather than domed. This is slightly different from the original of the college, and can also be seen on the Museum Building. It faces onto Library Square.
- Arms of Lord John Beresford, the second son of the first Marquess of Waterford, who was Chancellor of the University of Dublin. It faces onto Botany Bay.
- Archbishopric of Armagh, and impaled with those of Lord John Beresford. It faces onto Fellows’ Square.

=== Dome and lantern ===
Over the belfry are two domes which are covered in decorative scale-patterns. The first is the larger of the two and has carved scrollwork ribs that continue vertically from the columns of the belfry. The smaller dome sits directly above the larger, commonly referred to as a lantern rather than a dome. The entire campanile is then topped by a gilded cross.

== Tradition ==
The campanile is featured in the bouldering tradition of the Dublin University Climbing Club. Climbing the campanile under cover of night is considered the "most impressive climb, and one of the most difficult" attempted by club members on college grounds.
