= Trinity College Dublin Students' Union =

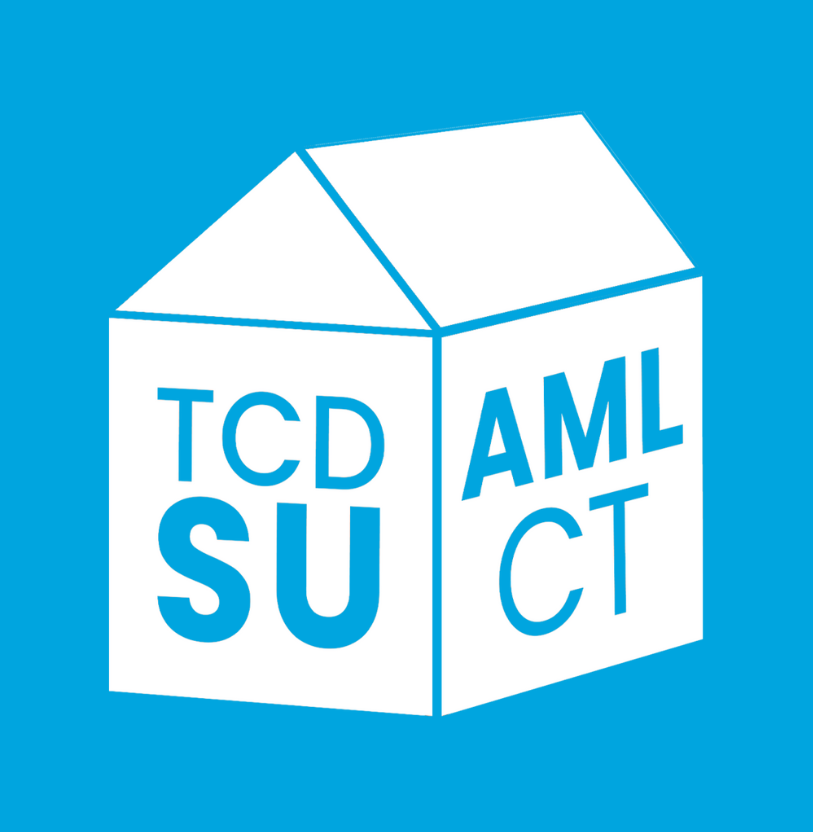
- Institution: Trinity College Dublin
- Location: Teach 6, Trinity College Dublin
- Established: 1968
- President: Grace McNally
- Members: over 20,000
- Affiliations: AMLÉ
- Website: www.tcdsu.org

Trinity College Dublin Students' Union (Irish: Aontas Mac Léinn Choláiste na Tríonóide), often referred to by its abbreviation TCDSU (Irish: AMLCT), is a students' union and the recognised representative body for the students of Trinity College Dublin. Its role is to provide a channel between the students and the authorities of the college, as well as to provide services to those students. TCDSU states that every Trinity undergraduate and postgraduate student is a member, covering more than 20,000 students. TCDSU is a constituent organisation of Aontas na Mac Léinn in Éirinn. The day-to-day business of the Union is run out of Teach 6, also known as Teach Mandela. The union is led by a team of sabbatical officers with the help of part-time officers, faculty convenors, school convenors and class representatives, alongside a number of permanent staff members. The student body elects a president every spring, who oversees the finances and management of the Union. The president for the 2025/26 academic year was Seán Thim O'Leary, until their resignation at the end of October 2025. Grace McNally was elected president in the resulting bye-election on 28 November 2025.

== Structure ==
TCDSU's representative structure includes sabbatical officers, part-time officers, class representatives, school and faculty convenors, Union Forum, SU Council and oversight/electoral commissions. There are also representatives from the college's various schools and courses who assist with policy development, campaigns and student casework. There are also two commissions designed to hold officers accountable: the Electoral Commission (responsible for elections) and the Oversight Commission (responsible for mandate compliance). As of 2024, there were six sabbatical officer positions: the president, the education officer, the welfare & equality officer, the communications & marketing officer, the entertainments (or 'Ents') officer and the Oifigeach na Gaeilge, the latter of which was introduced in February 2024. TCDSU's sabbatical officers take an intermission of their studies and receive a salary from the union while serving in their roles, but this is not the case for any other roles in the union. Elections for sabbatical officers are held every spring, with all capitated students (including incumbent sabbatical officers) eligible to run and vote. The president, the education officer and the welfare & equality officer are elected members of the college board. The education officer and the three faculty convenors are also elected members of the University Council. In September 2022, Trinity's board approved suspending university engagement with, and services to, the Graduate Students' Union. The capitation committee also suspended GSU funding and reallocated it to TCDSU for postgraduate support. In November 2024, TCDSU's council approved a motion to integrate postgraduates into the union's structures. In October 2025, a referendum on postgraduate representation passed with 87 per cent in favour. The change created a full-time Graduate Officer, codified Postgraduate Taught and Postgraduate Research Officer roles, and introduced undergraduate and postgraduate faculty and school convenors.

== Services ==
=== Campaigns ===
The union runs a number of campaigns, both at the college level and at the national level. As part of this, the union's officers organise various campaign weeks throughout the year addressing issues like mental health, gender equality and climate change. TCDSU has also been part of lobbying the Irish Government over issues such as the re-introduction of third-level fees and has campaigned against decisions made by the college considered unfavourable to students. Previous campaigns have included providing students with information on abortion services (at the time illegal in Ireland) and organising an encampment outside the Book of Kells to pressure the college into divesting from Israeli companies which operate in the Palestinian territories.

=== Trinity Ents ===
The Ents Officer runs Trinity Ents, which organises student social events during the year. Trinity Ents is associated with the annual Trinity Ball. In 2023, TCDSU said the Ents Officer was working with MCD and the Trinity Ball Committee to stage the event.

=== The University Times ===
A student newspaper, The University Times, is funded by the Students' Union. The editor of the University Times is elected in the same way as the sabbatical officers of the union, however they themselves are not a union officer and maintain their editorial independence. Like the sabbatical officers, however the editor of the University Times takes an intermission of their studies and receives a salary from the union while in the position. The University Times has received a number of awards, including Newspaper of the Year 2022 at the National Student Media Awards.

== Notable former officers ==
- Averil Power - CEO of the Irish Cancer Society, former union president and education officer
- Ivana Bacik - Leader of the Labour Party, former union president
- Joe Duffy - Radio and TV presenter for RTÉ, former union president
- Alex White - former senator and TD, former vice president of TCDSU
- Lynn Ruane - Senator, former president
- Mark Little - Journalist and TV presenter for RTÉ, former union president
- Rory Hearne - TD, former president
