= College Historical Society =

Debating society at Trinity College Dublin

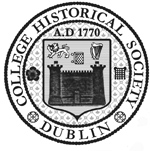
- Founded: 1770
- Type: Student debating union
- Location: Graduates Memorial Building
- Session: 257
- Current President: Mary Harney
- Website: TheHist.com

The College Historical Society (CHS) – informally known as The Hist – is a student debating union and society at Trinity College Dublin. It was initially established within the college in 1770 and was inspired by several preceding organisations, most notably the "Burke's Club" formed by philosopher Edmund Burke during his own time in Trinity in 1747. The Guinness World Records recognised it as the "world's oldest student society" in 2023. As of 2024, the president of the society is Mary Harney.

The society occupies rooms in the Graduates' Memorial Building at Trinity College. Former members have included a number of notable Irish men and women, from republican revolutionaries Theobald Wolfe Tone, Robert Emmet, and Henry Grattan, writers Bram Stoker, Oscar Wilde, and Samuel Beckett, to founding father of the Northern Irish state Edward Carson and first President of Ireland Douglas Hyde, and – in more recent times – Government Ministers like Mary Harney (who was the first female auditor of the society) and Brian Lenihan, and modern Irish authors, such as Sally Rooney and Naoise Dolan.

As of 2024, the College Historical Society were reigning champions of the European Universities Debating Championships (EUDC).

== History ==
=== Foundation ===
The first meeting of the College Historical Society took place on Wednesday 21 March 1770 in the Senior Common Room in Trinity College. The society took into its care the minute book of Burke's Club, founded 1747, from which the Hist has since drawn inspiration. Its other precursor was the Historical Club, founded in 1753, of which Henry Grattan was a member. James Reid became the first auditor of the Hist later in 1770. It was a time of great change in Ireland and the Western world, at the height of the Enlightenment and before the American War of Independence and the French Revolution. From its inception, it showed itself to be at the forefront of intellectual thought in Ireland, and many of its members later went into politics. In 1782, Lawrence Parsons was elected as an MP for Dublin University at 24, having served as auditor of the Hist just the previous year.

=== Restrictions and expulsions ===
Theobald Wolfe Tone, later leader of the United Irishmen, was elected auditor in 1785, and Thomas Addis Emmet was a member of the committee. The society was briefly expelled from the college in 1794, but readmitted on the condition that "No question of modern politics shall be debated". In 1797, the poet Thomas Moore and the nationalist Robert Emmet were elected as members. Eight members^{A} of The Hist were expelled in 1798 in the run-up to the Rebellion, and a motion was later carried condemning the rebellion, against their former auditor.

Tension between the society and the college flourished in the early nineteenth century, with the auditor being called before the provost in 1810. In 1812 the provost, Dr Thomas Elrington, objected vehemently to the question ‘Was Brutus justifiable in putting Julius Caesar to death?’. After a number of members were removed at the request of the college board, the society left the college in 1815.

=== Extern Society ===
The society continued from 1815 as the Extern Historical Society. Among its members at this time were Isaac Butt, a president of the society who tried unsuccessfully in 1832 to have the society readmitted, Joseph Sheridan LeFanu, Thomas Davis (a president of the society) and John Blake Dillon and many other notables of the nationalist cause. In 1843, under auditor William Connor Magee, future Archbishop of York, the society re-formed within the college after a student petition, again on the condition that no subject of current politics was debated. This provision remains in the laws of the society as a nod to the past, but the college authorities have long since ceased to restrict the subjects of the society's debates.

=== 19th century ===
The society continued successfully after that with many lively debates, including the motion on June 10, 1857 ‘That the Reform Bill of Lord Grey was not framed in accordance with the wants of the country’, proposed by Isaac Butt and opposed by Edward Gibson. This era was considered by many to be the high point of the society, with many of its members moving to high political positions. It was common for the Members of Parliament for Dublin University to have served on the Committee of the Hist, such as Edward Gibson and David Plunkett, who were both auditors, and Edward Carson, who was the librarian. Bram Stoker, author of Dracula, became auditor in 1872. In 1877, Charles O'Connor (judge), the last Master of the Rolls in Ireland, became auditor. In 1864 the society collected money from its members to erect statues of Edmund Burke and Oliver Goldsmith at the Front Gate of the college.

The society moved to the Graduates' Memorial Building (GMB) in 1904, which it shares with the University Philosophical Society. The college board relaxed its rules, allowing such motions as ‘That the Gaelic League is deserving of the support of every Irishman’ in 1905 and 1906.

=== 20th and 21st centuries ===
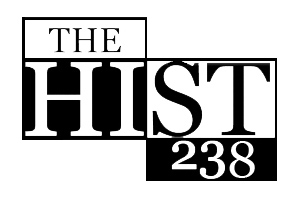
Logo of 238th Session of the College Historical Society (2007–2008)

The society continued well through the twentieth century, although the First World War hit it badly, with 136 of its former members killed. Eoin O'Mahony was elected auditor in 1930 and faced impeachment when he raised a toast to Ireland instead of the King. Eoin O'Mahony offered Lord Carson the presidency of the society in 1931, although Carson declined due to ill health, recommending that the position be offered to former gold medallist and future President of Ireland Douglas Hyde, who was elected to the position. The current president is Prof. David McConnell, a former librarian and auditor of the society and a winner of The Irish Times Debating Competition, and now chairman of The Irish Times Trust and one of Europe's foremost geneticists.

Son of W. B. Yeats, Michael Yeats became auditor in 1944, and in that capacity organised the inaugural meeting on 'The small nations'; Taoiseach Éamon de Valera and Jan Masaryk, minister for foreign affairs in the Czechoslovak government-in-exile in London, were his main speakers. Yeats had further involvement with the society in 1969 when it proposed admitting women members. The proposal passed by a single vote; having supported it, Yeats contended that had he stayed at home on the night of the vote the society would have remained all-male.

Women had been refused membership in the society until 1969. Soon after the change in the rules, the society debated the motion 'That this House reveres the memory of Mrs Pankhurst' with Rosaleen Mills participating (the motion, however, was defeated). The first female auditor, future Tánaiste Mary Harney, was elected in 1976. Since then the society has had eleven female auditors. The society's Bicentennial Meeting in 1970 was addressed by US Senator Edward Kennedy, at which he called the society "the greatest of the school of the orators".

In September 2020, the society reportedly cancelled an invitation to Richard Dawkins to address the society.

To mark the society's acknowledgement as the world's oldest student society, by Guinness World Records, a successful attempt to break the record for longest debate was made in October 2023, breaking 27 hours.

== Chamber debating ==
The main business of the society is the weekly debates held each Wednesday night during term time. The "Weekly Debate" is the second of the society's weekly meetings.

The motions debated by the society have covered several controversial issues. In 2005, over 500 people attempted to gain access to a debate on abortion which was targeted by Youth Defence protesters and a debate on euthanasia was recorded for a documentary on the pro-euthanasia group Dignitas for the Canadian Discovery Channel.

Politicians such as David Ervine, Jeffrey Donaldson and John Hume have spoken in debates on Northern Ireland. In 2005, the Minister for Justice, Equality and Law Reform, Michael McDowell, unveiled proposals for reform of the legal profession at a society debate on the matter. The inaugural meeting of the 236th session, in 2006, was addressed by former President of Ireland Mary Robinson.

== Competitive debating ==
Before the creation of a competitive debating structure, representatives of the society were invited to speak at similar societies internationally. As early as 1932 James Auchmuty and Garrett Gill travelled to Moorhead to speak at Minnesota State University.

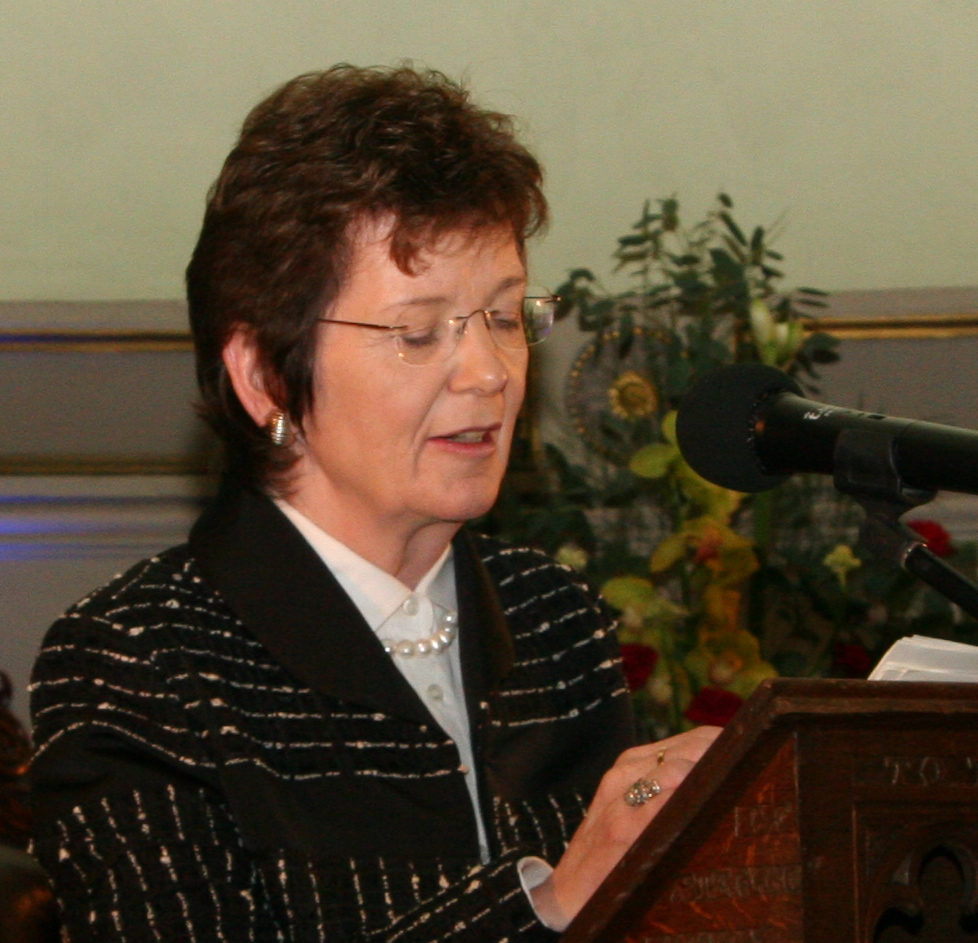
Irish President and UN Human Rights Commissioner Mary Robinson at the Hist, 2007

The society's best debaters compete nationally and internationally against other societies in competitions, most usually of the British Parliamentary debating style with the notable exception being the Irish Times public-speaking competition. Teams representing the society have won the overall team prize in the Irish Times Debating Competition more than any other institution.

It has also competed internationally, competing at foreign Inter-Varsities and at both the World Universities Debating Championship and European Universities Debating Championships (EUDC) - the society having hosted the former in 1992. As of 2021, the society held the European record for most wins at a single European Championships, a record set following the performance of two speakers in the 2021 championships in Madrid. In the 2023 edition of EUDC, a Hist team reached the grand final and became the first entirely female team from any Irish university to do so in over a decade (with the previous all female team having been a Hist team in 2011). In 2024, Martha McKinney-Perry and Andy Cullinan became the first Hist and second Trinity Team to have won the EUDC.

The society hosts the Trinity Women's Open, the Robert Emmett Invitational Summer Open, and the Dean Swift Intervarsity (Trinity IV), the largest Irish Inter-varsity each year. The society also plays a role in providing Secondary School Level Debating, and jointly runs the Leinster Schools' Debating Competition with the Literary and Historical Society.

== Presidents and vice-presidents ==
=== Presidents of the society since 1843 ===
Term	President	Hist record	Other roles
1843–1851	Rev. Franc Sadleir		Provost of Trinity College 1837–51
1852–1854	Rev. Richard MacDonnell		Provost of Trinity College 1851–67
1854–1883	Sir Joseph Napier, bt		Lord Chancellor 1858–59
1883–1913	Lord Ashbourne	Auditor	Lord Chancellor 1885–86, 1886–92, 1895–1905
1913–1925	Sir John Ross, bt		Lord Chancellor 1921–22
1925–1931	Lord Glenavy		Lord Chancellor 1918–21, Cathaoirleach of Seanad Éireann 1922–28
1931–1949	Douglas Hyde		President of Ireland 1937–45
1950–1952	Sir Robert W. Tate		Senior Fellow of Trinity College
1952–1983	Frederick Boland	Medallist	President of the UN General Assembly 1960–61, Chancellor of the University of Dublin 1963–1982
1983–2003	Conor Cruise O'Brien	Medallist	Minister for Posts and Telegraphs 1973–77
2003–2024	Prof. David John McConnell	Auditor, Medallist	Senior Fellow of Trinity College
2024–	Mary Harney	Auditor	Tánaiste 1997–2006

=== Current vice-presidents ===
As of 2019, the list of vice-presidents included:

- Mary Robinson, Chancellor of the University of Dublin, former president of Ireland
- Shane Ross, ex-Record Secretary, Leader of the Independent Alliance
- Senator David Norris, Senator for the University of Dublin.
- Mary Henry, former Senator for Dublin University
- David O'Sullivan, ex-auditor, Medallist, European Union Ambassador to the United States
- Ivana Bacik, Leader of the Labour Party, TD, former Senator for Dublin University
- Sean Barret, former Senator for the University of Dublin
- David F. Ford, ex-auditor, Regius Professor of Divinity at the University of Cambridge
- Peter Charleton, ex-auditor, Judge of the Supreme Court
- Iseult O'Malley, Judge of the Supreme Court
- Richard Clarke, ex-Record Secretary, Archbishop of Armagh
- Patrick Geoghegan, author of The College Historical Society 2020 book, professor of history at TCD

== Notes ==
A. Robert Emmett, Thomas Flynn, John Penefather Lamphier, Michael Farrall, Edward Barry, Thomas Bennett, Bernard Killen, and Patrick Fitzgerald. See various, 1892, pp. 85-88.

== Sources ==
- various (1892), The Book of Trinity College, Dublin, 1591-1891, Marcus Ward & Co. – via Project Gutenberg
- Potter, Tony, ed. (2017), The Pocket Book of Great Irish Speeches, Gill Books, ISBN 978-0717172917
- TCD Hist
- "'The Greatest of All Schools of Oratory' : Highlights from the Hist Archive", The Library of Trinity College Dublin, Trinity College Dublin
- Geoghegan, Patrick (2020), Trinity College Dublin: The College Historical Society, Oratory and Debate, 1770-2020, Hinds : The Lilliput Press, p. 500, ISBN 9781843517771
- Budd, Declan; Hinds, Ross (1997). The Hist and Edmund Burke's Club: An Anthology of the College Historical Society, the Student Debating Society of Trinity College, Dublin, from its Origins in Edmund Burke's Club 1747-1997. Lilliput Press. p. 417. ISBN 1901866009.
- Dagg, T.S. (1969), College Historical Society: A History (1770-1920), p. 440
- Burtchaell, George D. (July 1888), "Theobald Wolfe Tone and the College Historical Society", The Journal of the Royal Historical and Archaeological Association of Ireland, vol. 8, no. 75
