= The University Times =

Irish student newspaper

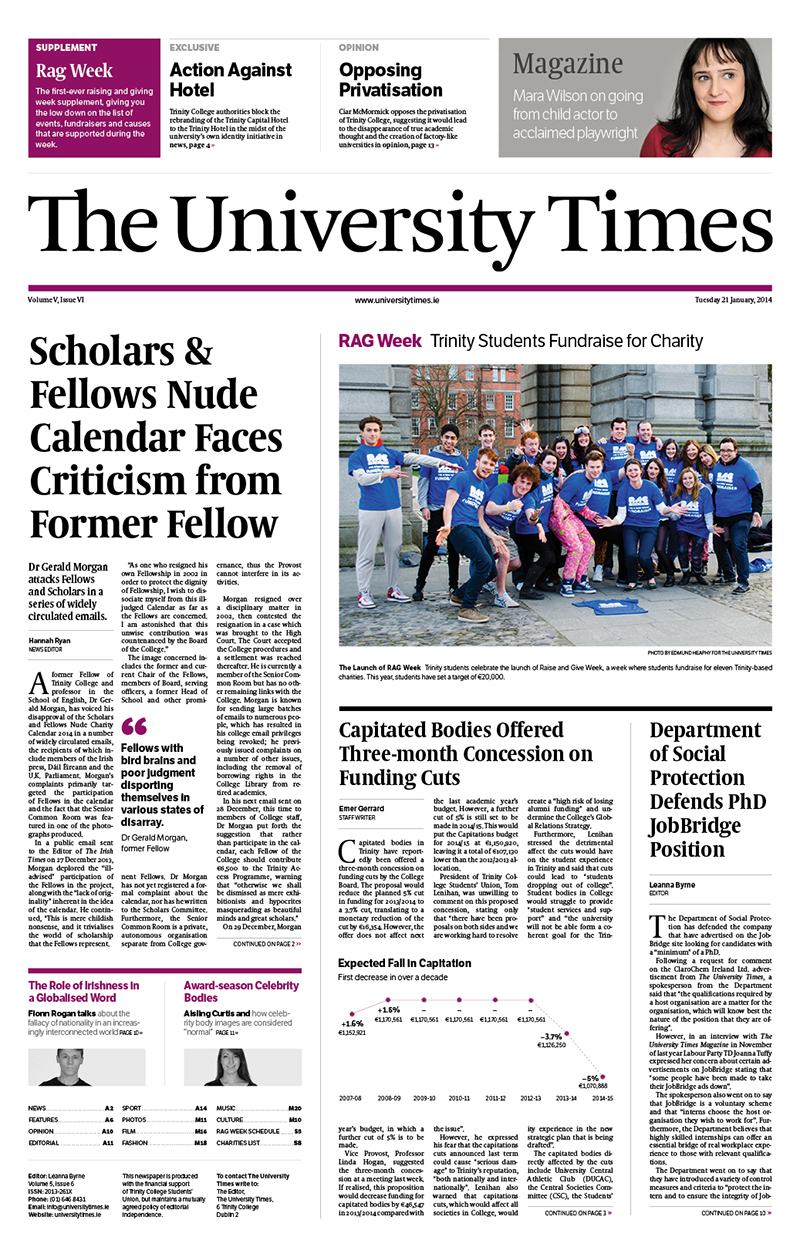
- The front page of The University Times on 21 January 2014
- Format: Broadsheet
- Editor: Harper Alderson
- Deputy editor: Freja Goldman
- Founded: 2009
- Headquarters: Mandela House, Trinity College, Dublin 2, Ireland
- Circulation: 10,000
- ISSN: 2009-261X
- Website: universitytimes.ie

The University Times (often abbreviated as UT) is the official student newspaper of Trinity College Dublin. It is financially supported by Trinity College Dublin Students' Union (TCDSU/AMLCT) but maintains a mutually agreed policy of editorial independence.

In 2026, the University Times won Best Publication in Ireland at the Student Publication Awards from the Student Publication Association. It also won Best Website in the UK and Ireland. It has consistently won Best Newspaper at the National Student Media Awards, having won recently in 2025 and 2022 . In 2017, it won the award for best all-around non-daily student newspaper in the world, as judged by the US-based Society of Professional Journalists.

In 2015, the newspaper's website had over one million unique readers for the first time. Its print edition, which consists of a broadsheet newspaper, magazine and culture supplement, is published every three weeks during the academic year.

== History ==
The University Times was founded in 2009 by Robert Donohoe, the then-Communications Officer of Trinity College Dublin Students' Union. It replaced that union's previous paper, The University Record. In his first editorial, Donohoe wrote about the importance of the free press, stating: "Any measure that attempts to impose a chilling effect on the immutable right of a newspaper to print what it is right to print is failing to protect the members of this College. The paper stands for the right to say just as much as it stands for your right to hear."

The newspaper primarily focuses on the happenings of Trinity College Dublin, in addition to wider student and education issues. In 2015, it was the first newspaper to report on the details of a high-profile report from a government working group on higher education funding.

Though it is funded by Trinity College Dublin Students' Union, its editorial line is often critical of the union – something that has led to increasing tensions. Until 2015 the union's Communications Officer served as the paper's editor; the posts were subsequently separated to facilitate the latter's independence. Patrick Prendergast, the Provost of Trinity College Dublin, said in 2019 "The University Times has pursued an independent course in many aspects of College life, and done so fearlessly."

Before it was the University Times, the paper operated as the University Record from 1998-2009. Before that, TCDSU published a magazine called Aontas ("Union" in English) from 1985-2998.

Radius is the paper's Dublin cultural supplement.

=== 2014 redesign ===
The print edition of The University Times was redesigned in 2014 by the paper's then-Creative Director, Edmund Heaphy, and under the editorship of Leanna Byrne. The paper's nameplate, which had been set in the Utopia typeface since the paper's founding, was redrawn. Headlines and body text were set in the Coranto 2 family, while LFT Etica features as a sans-serif counterpart. In two consecutive years, the design won "Best Overall Newspaper Design" in the Society for News Design's College News Design contest, with one of the judges, San Francisco Chronicle designer Luis Rendon, calling the paper a "powerhouse" for design. In 2015, Heaphy redesigned the paper's website. It subsequently won a similar award from the Society for News Design.

=== Independence ===
Students in Trinity have progressively voted to give the paper more independence from Trinity College Dublin Students' Union. Within several years of the founding of The University Times, the union's constitution was amended to guarantee the paper's editorial independence, even though the Union's Communications Officer had also always served as its editor. In a 2014 constitutional change, students voted to make the position of editor separate from that of the Communications Officer. The editor is now specifically elected by Trinity students annually, alongside the officers of Trinity College Dublin Students' Union.

At the last TCDSU student council of 2025, members voted to put forward a referendum to the student body that would bring the editor position closer to the status of Union sabbatical officers, such as the Entertainments Officer or Education Officer. The referendum specifically sought to require the editor to submit monthly reports to council, give council the ability to censure the editor, and make the editor impeachable under the TCDSU Constitution. The referendum passed in early October, 2025.

== Awards ==
The newspaper, its journalists and website have consistently won national and international awards. It won the "Newspaper of the Year" award at the Irish Student Media Awards in 2010, 2011 2012, 2022 and 2024 and it has consistently won the "Student Publication of the Year" award at the USI Student Achievement Awards, having won most recently in 2026. Similarly, its journalists have been awarded "Student Journalist of the Year" in 2014, 2015, 2016, 2017 and 2018 – including two wins by former editor Sinéad Baker, one win by former editor Edmund Heaphy and another by former editor Dominic McGrath.

In 2015 and 2016, the newspaper won several awards in the international College News Design contest organised by the Society for News Design, including "Best Overall Newspaper Design" and "Best Overall News Website". Heaphy won the "College Designer of the Year Award". The paper was also shortlisted for a Society of Professional Journalists award for editorial writing.

In 2017, it won the Society of Professional Journalists award for best all-around non-daily student newspaper in the world.

In 2026, it became the first Irish publication to win an award at the National SPA (Student Publication Association) awards ceremony, winning the award for "Best Website" across the UK and Ireland. The same year, it won best Publication in Ireland from the SPA.

== Controversies ==
=== Dispute with the Phil ===
In January 2015, the newspaper printed details of confidential correspondence that had been supplied to Samuel Riggs, who was then the editor of The University Times, by the University Philosophical Society on the condition that it would not be referred to in an article. Controversially, members of the society were asked by its president to confiscate copies of the paper from Trinity's campus. The University Times, however, acknowledged the error and subsequently agreed to withdraw the edition of the paper in question from circulation.

Members of the society's council discussed calling a motion to impeach the president as a result of the society's actions in collecting the newspapers, and it was later forced to pass a motion of confidence in the president.

The incident was cited as one of the factors leading to Riggs agreeing to take a permanent leave of absence from his position in March 2015.

=== Misconduct allegations ===
A 2016 report prepared by a committee of senior members of Trinity College Dublin Students' Union alleged that staff of the newspaper, including then-editor Edmund Heaphy, had engaged in what rival newspaper Trinity News described as "serious breaches of journalistic conduct", including fabrication of evidence, mistreatment of staff, and biased and unfair reporting.

While the union chose not to publish the report itself, Trinity News reported that "undue stress" had been placed on staff and that "mistreatment was common".

The newspaper's senior editors rejected the report's findings. The union's president, Lynn Ruane, described the report as "an account of some hearsay and rumours", while its Education Officer Molly Kenny described the report as "piles of rumours". The Board of Trustees of the union rejected the report's recommendations and chose not to convene the newspaper's oversight board.

=== Knights of the Campanile Hazing ===
In March 2019, reporting conducted by the newspaper about hazing in a secret society known as the Knights of the Campanile aroused controversy due to the paper's use of a covert recording device during its investigations. The device had been placed near an apartment door where the society was holding its initiation evening. Rival student newspaper Trinity News suggested that the use of a recording device amounted to a "bugging" and called on the editor of The University Times, Eleanor O'Mahony, to step down.

The University Times defended the secret recording, suggesting that its reporting was in the public interest and thus that the practice was protected by law. Three Trinity law professors subsequently criticised The University Times, calling the suggestion "a misunderstanding of the law". Former Attorney General Michael McDowell, however, defended The University Times, calling their conclusion "clearly wrong", and noting that the situation was "inherently more complex than their analysis suggests". Andrea Martin, a solicitor who had previously led the in-house legal team at RTÉ, similarly defended the reporting.

In the immediate aftermath of the controversy, more than 500 students signed a petition in order to hold a referendum on a proposal to slash the funding of The University Times and make the position of editor unpaid.

Chris Frost, the chair of the ethics council of the National Union of Journalists, called the referendum an "appalling attempt to curtail a free press" and said that the reporting and methods used in the Knights of the Campanile story were "beyond reproach and consistent with the highest professional standards of public interest, investigative journalism."

The referendum attracted national attention, including from columnist Gene Kerrigan, who said that a vote to cut the paper's funding would be an endorsement of the "sordid behaviour" exposed by the newspaper's journalists. More than 3,000 students voted in the April 2019 referendum, with 74% rejecting the proposal to cut the paper's funding.
