= Trinity News =

- Trinity's Independent Student Newspaper
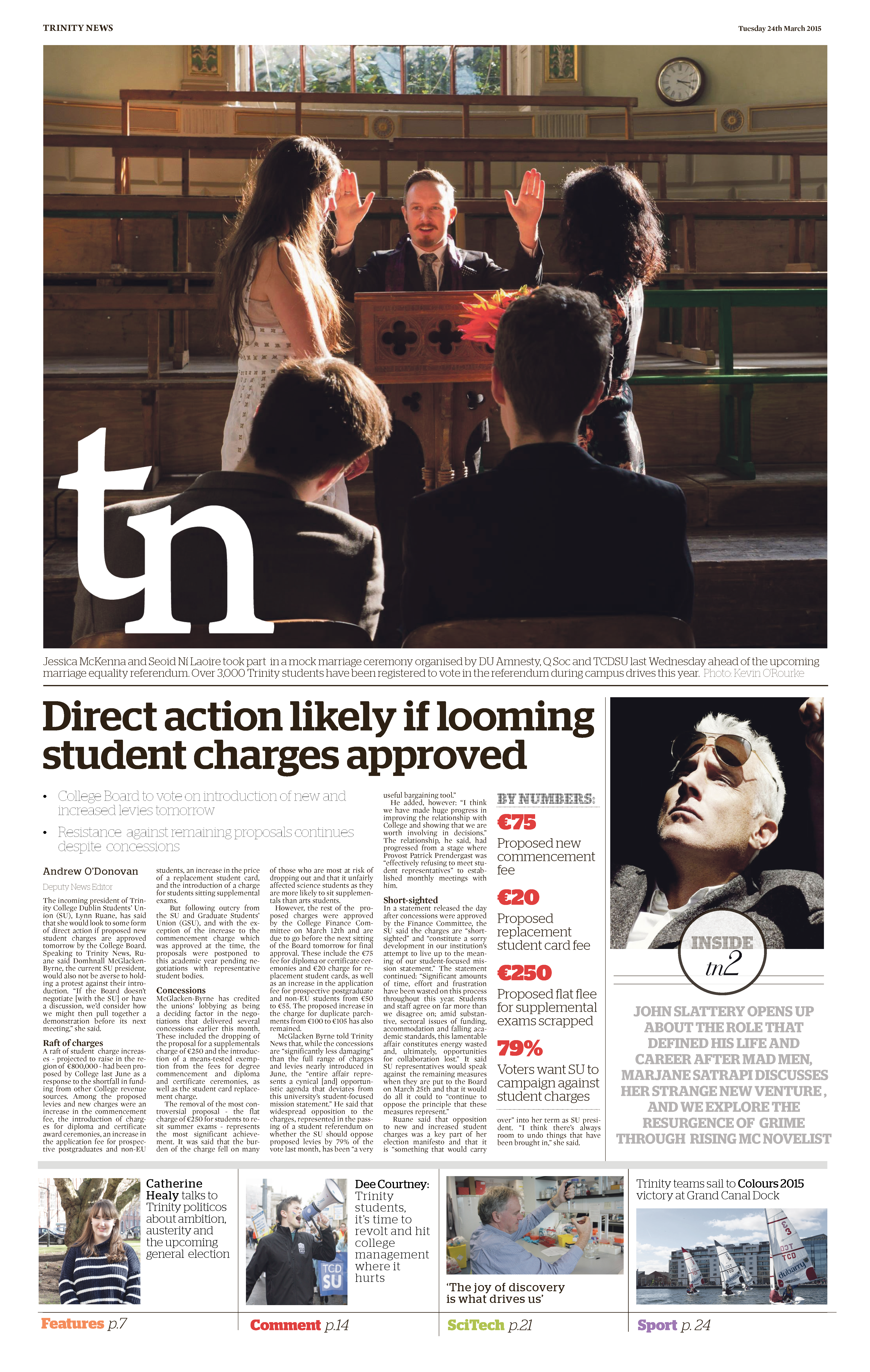
- Cover of Trinity News Volume 61, Issue 7
- Type: Student newspaper
- Format: Compact
- School: Trinity College Dublin
- Editor: Aoibhínn Clancy
- Founded: 1953
- Headquarters: House Six Trinity College; Dublin 2, Ireland
- Circulation: 2,500-3,000
- Website: trinitynews.ie

Trinity News is Ireland's oldest student newspaper, published from Trinity College Dublin. It is an independent newspaper, funded by Trinity Publications, which reports on the news and views of the students and staff of Dublin University, and the broader Irish higher education sector. The newspaper was first published in 1953 and is using this date as the first volume that the volume numbers are currently derived.

Published every three weeks, the current sections are News, Features, Comment, SciTech, and Sport, as well as a ‘Life’, a supplement on Dublin student life. The newspaper also has Art, Photography, Video and Podcast departments.

Trinity News has won over 40 awards in its history.

== History ==
Trinity News was founded by Anthony J. Bolchover, who also served as the chairperson, later known as Editor, for that year. The editorial of the first issue read: “As our name implies, we aim to present news of the Dublin University to as wide a circle as possible of those who have an interest in the University. We shall endeavour to be widely representative, to avoid superfluous comment and to offer news objectively. There has been, we feel, a long want for such a paper. Apart from the efforts of our own staff, news contributions from all undergraduates and graduates will be welcomed for publication. Only this way will Trinity News become the truly democratic newspaper intended by its founders. If in the process, and in the news we present, there results some revival of the collegiate spirit which modern conditions tend to discourage, the newspaper will have justified itself.”

The newspaper is produced exclusively by students of the university under the direction of a student Editor. Due to the increased number of issues and workload, it has become common practice for the editor to take a sabbatical from studies for the year, or take up the position full-time following graduation. Different editors for the Michaelmas term and Hilary term were appointed until 1980, when one editor was appointed for the entire academic year. Throughout its history, Trinity News has varied between electing and appointing editors, with elections taking place in recent years.

In addition to advertising revenue, Trinity News is funded in part by a grant from the Dublin University Publications Committee, but the newspaper has full editorial independence.

== Format ==
Over the years, Trinity News has appeared in both broadsheet and tabloid format. Since the 2018/19 edition, Trinity News has taken tabloid format, consisting of 48 pages, including a 16-page ‘Life’ supplement.

== Notable stories ==
In 2017/18, Trinity News extensively followed several stories which gained national media attention, including protests against the introduction of supplemental exam fees in Trinity and the impeachment of then-UCDSU president Katie Ascough. The newspaper also broke several stories which provoked discussion on campus, including the College Historical Society's decision to award MEP Nigel Farage a gold medal for Outstanding Contribution to Public Discourse, the accidental withdrawal of a student from the university due to administrative errors, and the fining of Students for Justice in Palestine following their protest of a planned talk by the Israeli Ambassador to Ireland, Zeev Boker.

The newspaper has revealed information that provoked controversy and discussion within the college in previous years also. For example, the newspaper demonstrated that students from fee paying secondary schools ware four times more likely to get a place in Trinity in 2016, using data obtained from The Irish Times The previous year, Trinity News learned that teaching assistants of several departments were not paid or received reduced wages for long work hours, and that Trinity had commenced a review of its relationships with third-level institutions in Israel and Palestine.

In 2005, a story published in Trinity News revealed that the American air force was funding a research program in Trinity College. The story caused controversy among students and was reported on in the national press. It was also raised during question time in the Dáil.

== Awards ==
Trinity News has won over 40 awards, all of which came in the last 20 years following the establishment of student media awards in Ireland. Most notably, the newspaper has been awarded Newspaper of the Year seven times, Editor of the Year five times, and Layout and Design six times at the Irish Student Media Awards.

Trinity News journalists have also won individual prizes at the Irish Student Media Awards in recent years, including Journalist of the Year, Sports Writer, Best Social and Political Features Writer, Web Designer of the Year, Science Education Correspondent of the Year and Photographer of the Year.

The newspaper has also received accolades from other sources, such as the USI Awards and The Guardian Student Media Awards.

== Notable alumni ==
Trinity News journalists have written for national publications such as The Irish Times, The Guardian, BBC, Dublin Inquirer, Jacobin Magazine, RTÉ, the Irish Independent, the UK Independent, the Financial Times, The Sunday Business Post, The New Arab, BuzzFeed, The Phoenix, Newstalk, Storyful and TheJournal.ie.

Some of Trinity News's most recent notable alumni include the following:

- Colin Smythe (Publisher of Terry Pratchett)
- Mark Little (Prime Time presenter, RTÉ)
- Ruadhán Mac Cormaic (Editor of the Irish Times)
