= Australian rules football in Ireland =

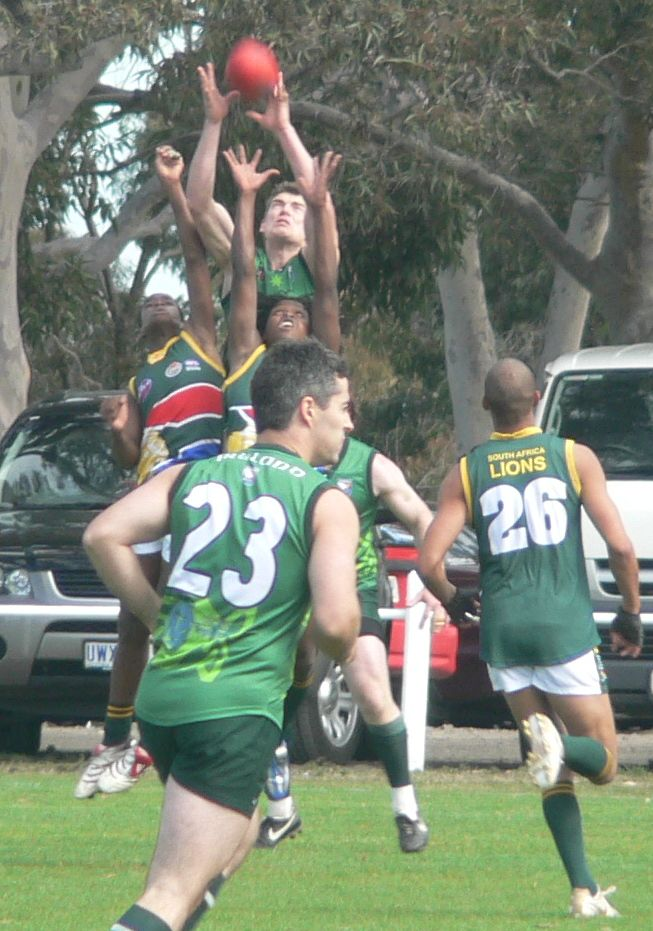
- Ireland's Mike Finn takes a strong pack mark against South Africa in a 2008 International Cup match
- Country: Ireland
- Governing body: AFL Ireland
- National team: Ireland
- First played: 1999, Dublin & Belfast
- Registered players: ~200
- Clubs: 9

In Ireland, Australian rules football (known locally as "Aussie Rules") began in 1999 when clubs were simultaneously formed in Dublin and Belfast, however awareness of it dates back to the 20th century due to similarities with Gaelic football and hybrid matches played between Irish and Australian teams. It has subsequently becoming a source of players for professional leagues in Australia, particularly the Australian Football League (AFL) and later the AFL Women's (AFLW) through the Irish Experiment which is ongoing. It attracts a television audience, particularly the AFLW competition (but also the men's AFL) through TG4. There are two governing bodies, AFL Ireland (which is a member of AFL Europe) and AFL Northern Ireland, with teams and competitions in Belfast, Cork, Dublin, Galway and Killarney. The game in Ireland is typically played in a modified 9-a-side footy format on rectangular fields.

While coexisting with and relying heavily on players from Gaelic games, Ireland has become one of the most decorated nations in Australian rules with the national team, formed in 2001, winning second most men's international titles (2) and most women's international titles (2) as well as the most European Championship titles (2) and Euro Cup women's titles (4). Professional AFL/AFLW players to have represented Ireland internationally include Laura Duryea, Clara Fitzpatrick and Padraig Lucey.

Jim Stynes (the first to win an AFL best and fairest) along with Tadhg Kennelly (first to win an AFL premiership), achieved a level of fame at home and in turn raised the profile of the AFL. Ailish Considine was the first to win an AFLW premiership achieving similar fame. Current player Zach Tuohy holds the Irish born and raised record for the most games while Jim Stynes holds the record for most goals with 130. Sarah Rowe holds the AFL Women's record for most games and Cora Staunton holds the record for most goals with 55. There were a record 33 Irish players listed with clubs for the 2023 AFLW season.

== History ==
One could argue that the Irish have been playing Australian rules as early as the 1870s, as recent evidence suggests that a form of football being played in south western Ireland at the time was played under Victorian rules in a fashion indistinguishable from that of the game played in Australia, and early on it was even played with a rugby ball, with a mark for catching the ball and with upright posts of the Australian game. It is not known how or when the Victorian rules were introduced to Ireland, however its legacy can be found in the written rules of the Commercials Club of County Limerick from the early 1880s which later, along with elements of soccer, formed the basis for Gaelic Football.

Primarily Irish historians analysing accounts of the traditional Irish football caid and Gaelic Athletic Association (GAA) codified rules against the Melbourne Football Club rules of 1959 and Victorian Rules of 1866 and 1877 and those of other codes appear to strongly indicate that Gaelic football originated as a hybrid of Australian Football and Association Football. Like Australian Football, this was in an effort to differentiate from rugby and was primarily based on the Victorian Rules of 1866 and 1877. For example early codified Gaelic called for Australian rules style behind posts (not present in caid and later removed) with 5 point goals scoring (later changed to 3) and 1 point "behind"s all borrowed from Australian Rules, and Rule 27 in reference to kicking styles, Rule 15 relating to foul play and rules dictating playing equipment appear to be directly borrowed from the Victorian Rules. Early Victorian Rules was played with also a round ball until the introduction of the Sherrin in the 1880s. Other than the directly copied rules, analysts argue that so many of the rules are so similar to the Victorian Rules that the GAA must have obtained a deep knowledge of these laws. In any case the Irish game has been gradually evolving closer the Australian game since and as recently as 2017 with the GAA's introduced "the mark" from Australian Football, one of the game's other distinctive to encourage more spectacular aerial contests.

=== Irish involvement in the early game in Australia ===
Irish have been involved in the game since its earliest days in Australia. Thomas H. Smith of Carrickmacross, County Monaghan was involved in the formation of the Melbourne Football club from 1858 and the drafting of the first rules for the code in 1859.

The Carlton Football Club is said to have been initiated in 1864 by Sir Redmond Barry of Ballyclough, County Cork.

One of the founders of the St Kilda Football Club in 1873, J.J. Casey, was from Tromroe, County Clare.

The Colony of Queensland's first club, the Brisbane Football Club in the 1880s had a prominent Irish component, as such its early presidents Joshua Peter Bell and Kevin Izod O'Doherty were from Kildare and Dublin respectively.

=== Early interactions with Australian rules ===
In the 1920s, the GAA and Australasian Football Council were becoming increasingly aware of each other's growing global footprint and the first test matches between the two countries were proposed though were never contested with correspondence occurring between the two sporting bodies.

=== First efforts to introduce the code into Ireland ===
The Australian High Commissioner to Ireland, Mr Mulrooney of the Canberra Australian Football Association attempted to introduce Australian Football to Dublin in 1946.

The similarity between the codes eventually raised the awareness in Ireland of the Australian sport.

=== Australian Football World Tour ===
In 1967, Harry Beitzel drew inspiration from watching the 1966 All-Ireland Senior Football Championship final on television and formed an Australian side, nicknamed "The Galahs", to play the game against an Irish side. The next year he organised the Australian Football World Tour, a six-match series with games played against Irish teams in Ireland, the United Kingdom and United States of America. What followed was the beginning of regular interaction between the two codes which was to become the hybrid code of International rules football played in both countries and facilitating the cross code competition.

=== Irish experiment ===
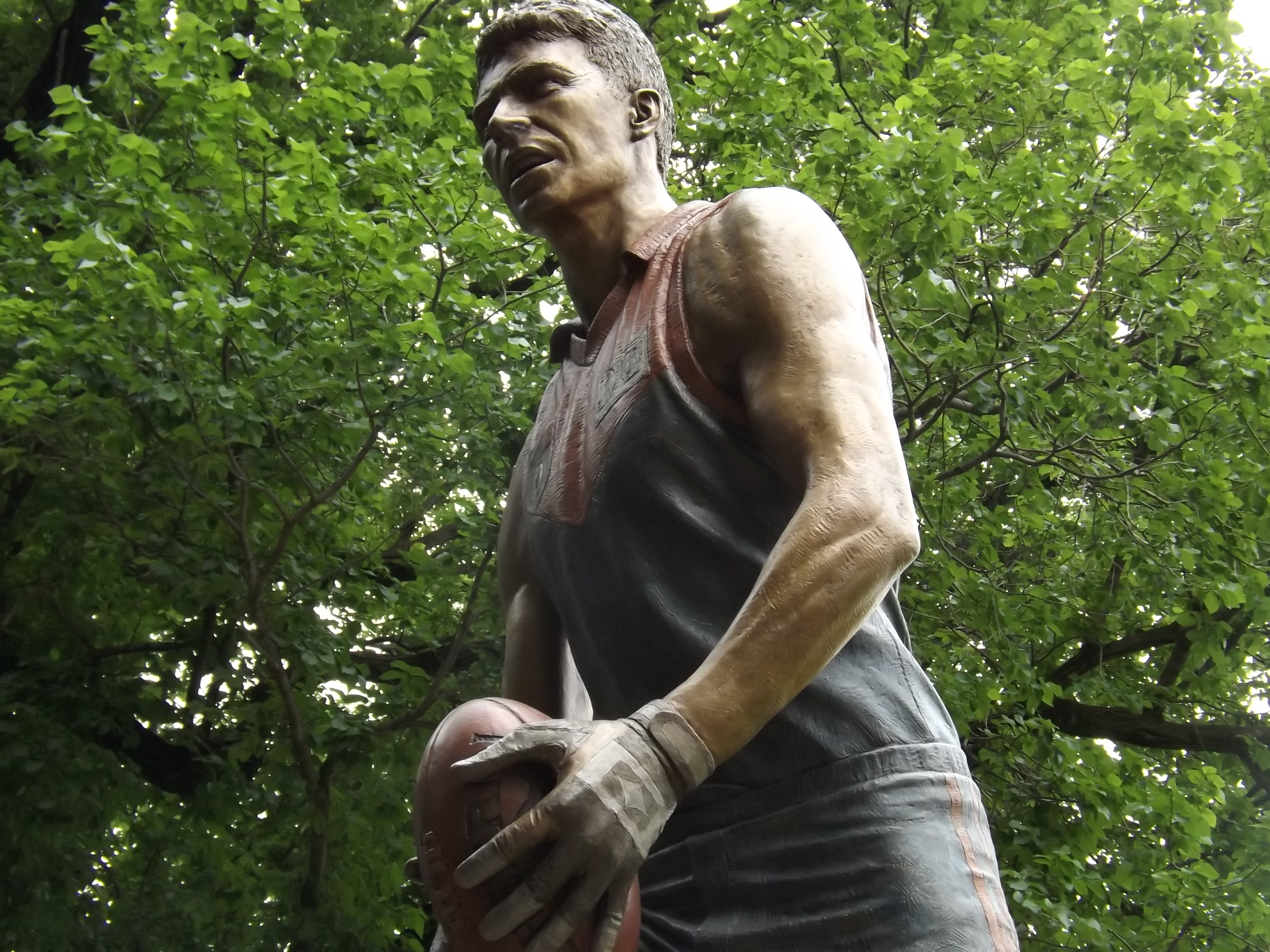
Statue of the late Jim Stynes unveiled in 2014. Stynes is considered a pioneer and one of the greats from Ireland having won the 1991 Brownlow Medal, and played 264 AFL games

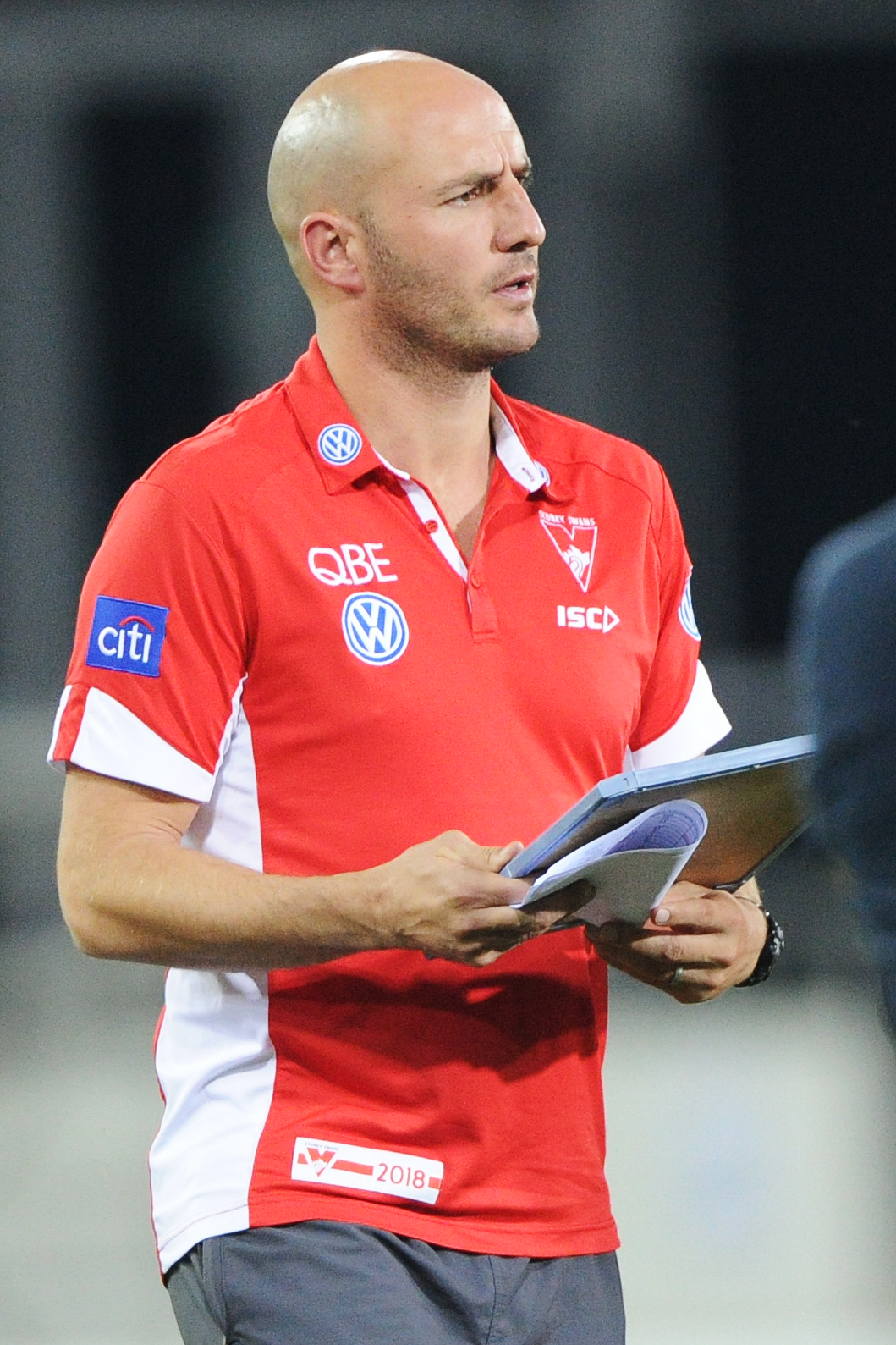
Tadhg Kennelly became the first Irish AFL premiership player in 2005 and represented Ireland 6 times. He has since helped promote Australian rules by developing Irish players and establishing player pathways.

Ron Barassi, drawing comparisons between Australian rules football and Gaelic football was of the opinion that Gaelic footballers could provide a previously untapped pool of potential Australian Rules players. As a result, wealthy Victorian clubs were scouting Ireland for new talent. In 1982, Barassi (then the Melbourne VFL club coach) and his recruiting team including Melbourne's Barry Richardson travelled to Ireland, looking for young, tall, and talented players. Over the following years, a number of Irish athletes made the journey to Australia to play professionally in Australia. Players were found not only from Gaelic football codes, but other sports including hurling and rugby. Some, including Jim Stynes, Tadhg Kennelly and Martin Clarke, achieved a level of fame in Ireland either going on to careers in Australia or returning home to achieve success in their sports at home and along with the International Rules Series, increase the profile and awareness of the Australian game.

=== Formation of the ARFLI and national team ===
Two clubs, in Dublin and Belfast, recruited and trained through the winter of 1999 and played a number of British Aussie rules clubs in challenge matches in early spring 2000. The Australian Rules Football League of Ireland (ARFLI) was formed in October 2000 after the first ever Irish Grand Final was contested between them. The following year, players from the clubs were drawn to form the first national team.

=== Growth and expansion ===
In the 2010s, the women's game grew rapidly and the first national team was established and players began to make their way to women's leagues in Australia.

By 2014, the league had grown to more than 200 players and expanded to six men's clubs and three women's clubs.

== Competitions and Clubs ==
Location map of current clubs across the Republic of Ireland and Northern Ireland.

=== Competitions ===
Active competition

Competition	Founded	Notes
Australian Rules Football League of Ireland Premiership	2001	ARFLI website

=== Clubs ===
Active club

Club	Location	Founded	Notes
Belfast Redbacks	City of Belfast (Mallusk) Playing Fields, Mallusk, County Antrim, Belfast	2010	Belfast Redbacks
Cork Vikings (women's)	Tramore Valley Park, Cork	2020	Cork Vikings
Galway Magpies	South Park, Galway	2010	Galway Magpies
Kerry Suns	Tralee Sports Complex, Killarney	2021	Kerry Suns
Leeside Lions	Tramore Valley Park, Cork	2001	Leeside Lions
South Dublin Swans	Memorial Park, Kilmainham, Dublin	2006	South Dublin Swans
Ulster Kookaburras (women's)	Queen's University Malone Playing Fields, Belfast	2021	Ulster Kookaburras
Ulster Wolfhounds	Queen's University Malone Playing Fields, Belfast	2021	

== National teams ==
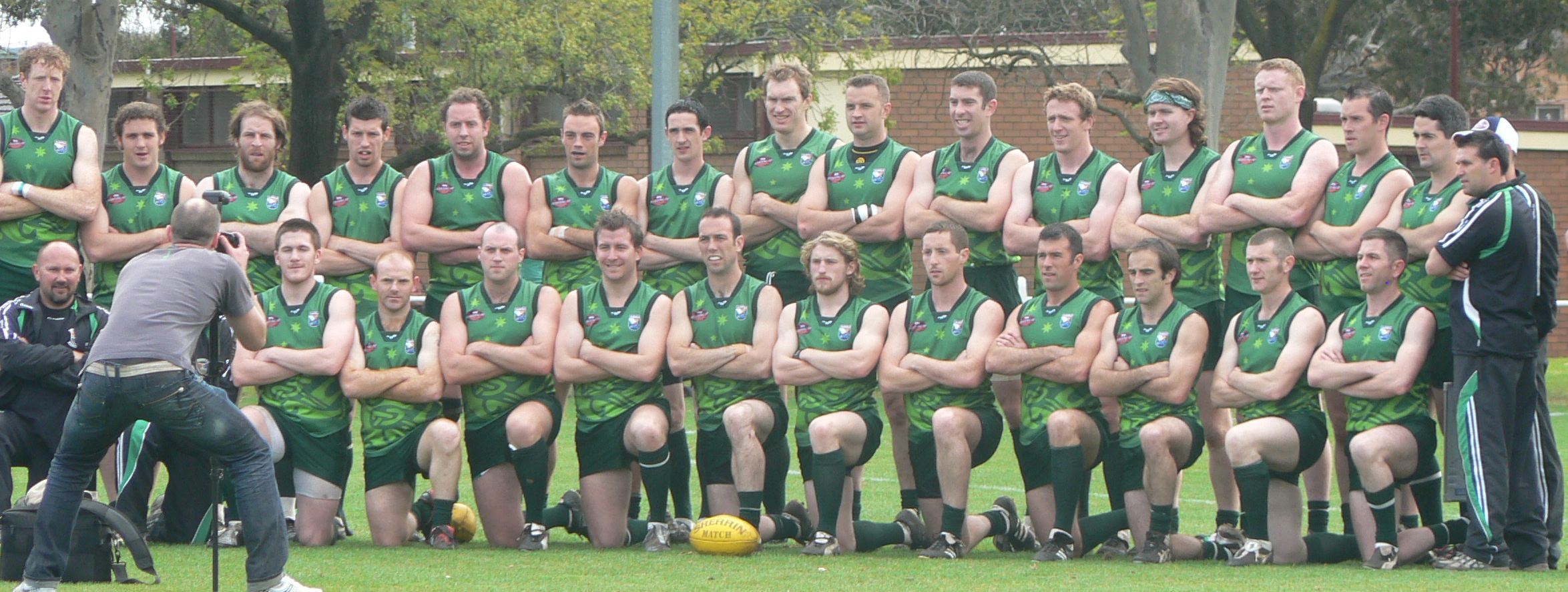
Ireland in 2008, the team won the Australian Football International Cup in 2002 and 2011.

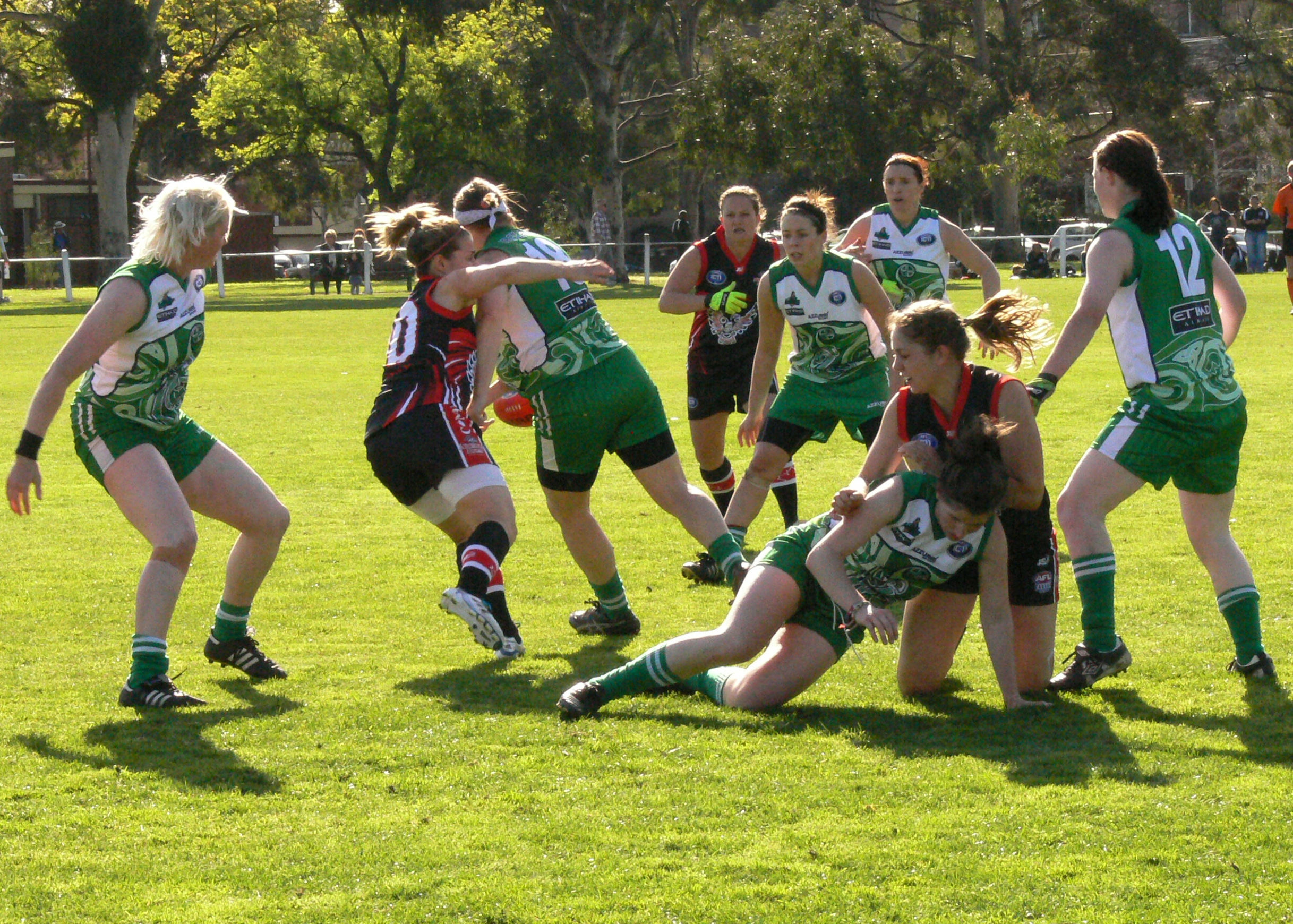
Ireland's women's team playing in the women's division in 2011

Ireland's national team competes internationally at the Australian Football International Cup, AFL Europe Championship and Euro Cup.

=== History ===
An Irish National Aussie rules team, drawn from all ARFLI affiliated clubs headed to London between 6–15 October to take part in the Atlantic Alliance Cup 2001 – a five nations International competition with United States, Canada, Great Britain and Denmark providing the opposition. A final panel of 24 players, whittled down from 60 over a three-month training period made the trip. Ireland, playing their first ever competitive International matches, won all their games in the round robin series and went on to record a win against Denmark (pre-tournament favourites) in the Grand Final. This was a huge achievement for such a young league against teams from leagues that had been established for ten years plus. Darren Fitzpatrick of Kilkenny, who previously played Aussie Rules at a professional level with the Western Bulldogs in Australia, coached the team.

In August 2002, the National team attended the Australian Football International Cup (an Amateur World Cup for nations outside of Australia). The team went into the competition as third seeds behind Papua New Guinea and New Zealand. The competition was a success for Ireland as they beat Canada, Samoa, USA, South Africa and New Zealand in the group stage and went on to beat PNG in a televised final at the Melbourne Cricket Ground. The team which was again coached by Darren Fitzpatrick, and was captained by Michael Johnston.

In 2005, the "Green Machine" again attended the Australian Football International Cup. With injuries and late withdrawals, the team managed a fourth place behind New Zealand, Papua New Guinea and USA.

Jim Stynes' brother David coached the 2014 national side hoping to defend the title however the side failed to defeat Papua New Guinea in the final.

The men's side was considered favourites going into the 2017 international cup, thought they finished in 3rd place.

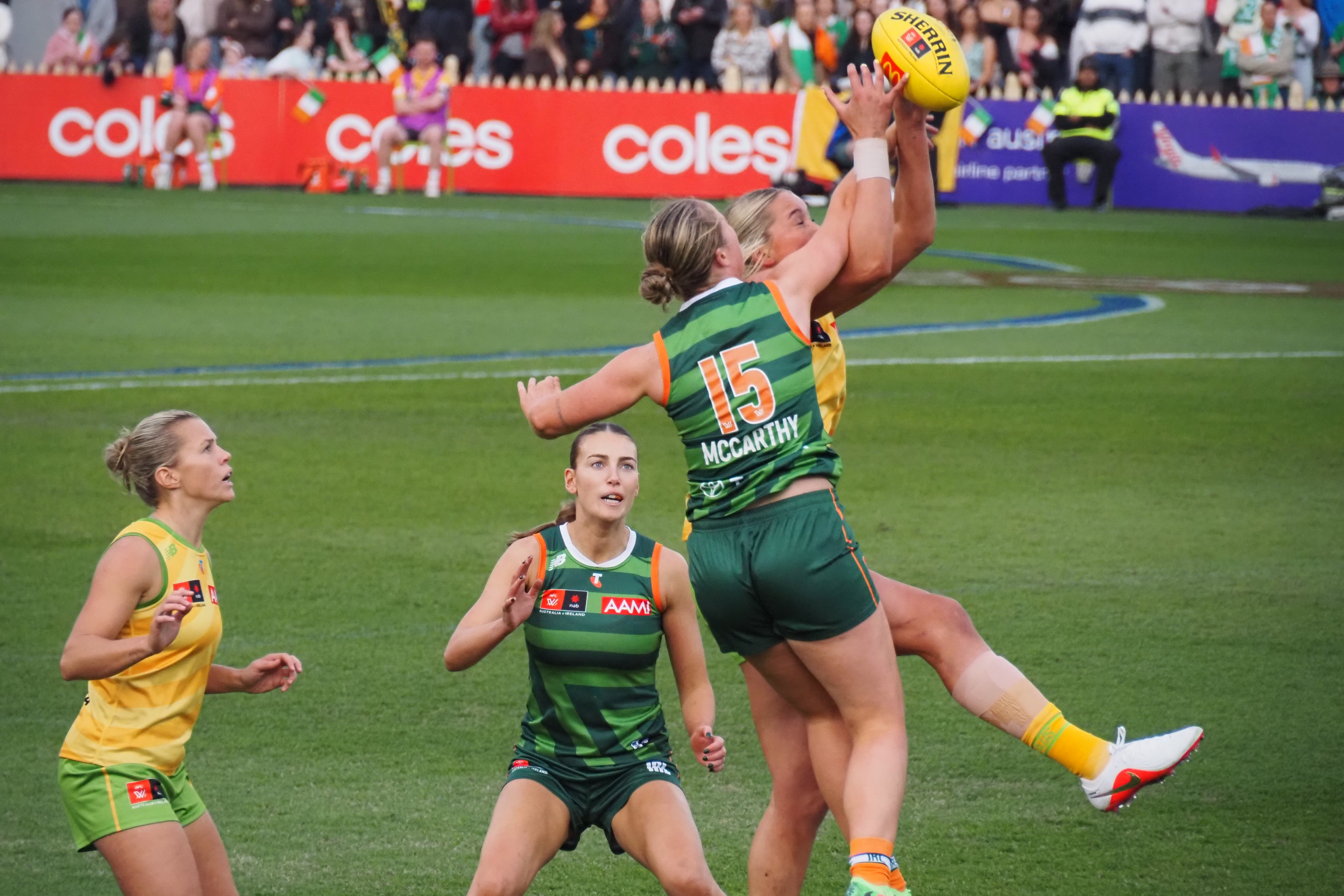
Action from the first ever fully professional international: 2026 AFL Women's Australia v Ireland match.

Ireland fielded its first professional-level women's team to play Australia in Australia in the 2026 AFL Women's Australia v Ireland match and while competitive was not initially successful.

== Governing body and participation ==
The governing body is AFL Ireland. Formerly it was the Australian Rules Football League of Ireland (ARFLI) until the league affiliated with the AFL Commission.

== Media coverage ==
The sport, and International Rules has been covered in the media for many years, though it was only in 2010 that there has been regular AFL coverage on television through TG4. The and also in the media, including the International Rules Series. In 2021 the AFLW began showing on TG4.

== Current Irish AFLW Players ==
All Irish Players Currently Playing in the AFLW 2026

Club	Name	County
Adelaide Crows	Kayleigh Cronin	Kerry
Adelaide Crows	Grace Kelly	Mayo
Adelaide Crows	Niamh Kelly	Mayo
Adelaide Crows	Amy Boyle-Carr	Donegal
Brisbane Lions	Neasa Dooley	Kildare
Brisbane Lions	Jennifer Dunne	Dublin
Brisbane Lions	Orla O'Dwyer	Tipperary
Brisbane Lions	Caitlin Kennedy	Tipperary
Carlton	Dayna Finn	Mayo
Carlton	Aisling Reidy	Clare
Carlton	Erone Fitzpatrick	Laois
Carlton	Síofra O'Connell	Clare
Collingwood	Sarah Rowe	Mayo
Collingwood	Ellie Brady	Cavan
Collingwood	Kellyann Hogan	Waterford
Essendon	Emma Dineen	Kerry
Fremantle Dockers	Orlagh Lally	Meath
Fremantle Dockers	Aisling McCarthy	Tipperary
Fremantle Dockers	Áine Tighe	Leitrim
Fremantle Dockers	Aoife Healy	Cork
Geelong Cats	Rachel Kearns	Mayo
Geelong Cats	Aishling Moloney	Tipperary
Geelong Cats	Emma Murray	Waterford
Geelong Cats	Kate Kenny	Offaly
Gold Coast Suns	Clara Fitzpatrick	Down
Gold Coast Suns	Niamh McLaughlin	Donegal
Greater Western Sydney Giants	Grace Kos	Dublin
Greater Western Sydney Giants	Eilish O'Dowd	Leitrim
Hawthorn	Aine McDonagh	Galway
Hawthorn	Hannah Looney	Cork
Hawthorn	Niamh Martin	Tipperary
Melbourne	Sinead Goldrick	Dublin
Melbourne	Aoife Horisk	Tyrone
Melbourne	Blaithin Mackin	Armagh
North Melbourne	Vikki Wall	Meath
North Melbourne	Sarah Wall	Meath
North Melbourne	Erika O'Shea	Cork
North Melbourne	Bláithín Bogue	Fermanagh
North Melbourne	Amy Gavin Mangan	Offaly
Richmond Tigers	Aoibhin Cleary	Meath
Richmond Tigers	Ana Mulholland	Antrim
St Kilda	Saoirse Lally	Mayo
Sydney Swans	Tanya Kennedy	Donegal
Sydney Swans	Paris McCarthy	Kerry
Sydney Swans	Julie O'Sullivan	Kerry
Sydney Swans	Mary-Kate Lynch	Meath

== Current Irish AFL Players ==
Club	Name	County
Adelaide Crows	Mark Keane	Cork
Brisbane Lions	Ben Murphy	Kerry
Brisbane Lions	Darragh Joyce	Kilkenny
Brisbane Lions	Conor McKenna	Tyrone
Carlton	Rob Monahan	Kerry
Essendon	Cillian Bourke	Offaly
Geelong Cats	Mark O'Connor	Kerry
Geelong Cats	Oisín Mullin	Mayo
Geelong Cats	Cillian Burke	Kerry
Greater Western Sydney Giants	Callum Brown	Derry
Hawthorn	Conor Nash	Meath
St Kilda	Liam O'Connell	Cork
St Kilda	Kobe McDonald (2027)	Mayo
St Kilda	Eamonn Armstrong	Meath

== See also ==
- List of Australian rules football leagues outside Australia
