= Lota House (Ireland) =

Historical Irish residence

Coordinates: 51.9078°N 8.3998°W

Lota House is an 18th-century house overlooking the River Lee near Glanmire, County Cork, Ireland. According to multiple sources, it was built c. 1765 by the architect Davis Ducart. The house was acquired by the Brothers of Charity in the first half of the 20th century and is now used as a convalescence home. The building is included in the Record of Protected Structures maintained by Cork City Council.

== History ==
The land on which Lota House stands, in Lotamore townland, was originally associated with the Galwey family. In "The Galweys of Munster" (Journal of the Cork Historical and Archaeological Society, 1967) Henry Blackhall lists each successive Galwey owner of Lotamore, and notes that Edward Galwey (1804–1873) "was the last Galwey owner" of the lands at Lotamore. Other houses in the same area include Lota Park, Lota Lodge (now the Vienna Woods Hotel), Lotamore House and Lotabeg House.

Several sources, including the National Inventory of Architectural Heritage and Dictionary of Irish Architects, indicate that the main house was designed by the architect Davis Ducart and built c. 1765 for members of the Rogers family. The central block of Lota House is a three-storey nine-bay structure with masonry quoins and a carved cornice.

According to the Landed Estates Database, the lands at Lota House were later associated with the Courtney (or Courtenay) family. In the 1830s, the house was occupied by William Hastings Greene who "held Lota on a long lease from Robert Courtenay". By the 1850s, George A. Wood was the resident tenant of Lota House in 1851, having leased it from John Courtney.

The house was acquired by the Brothers of Charity in the 1940s, who continue to operate convalescence services from the site. A chapel was built alongside the main house in the 1960s.
