= List of historic houses in the Republic of Ireland =

This is a list of historic houses in the Republic of Ireland which serves as a link page for any stately home or historic house in Ireland.

== County Carlow ==
- Dunleckney Manor
- Lisnavagh House

== County Cavan ==
- Bailieborough Castle (demolished)
- Bellamont House
- Cabra Castle
- Castle Saunderson

== County Clare ==
- Dromoland Castle
- Ennistymon House (now the Falls Hotel)
- Mount Ievers Court
- Moy House
- Newhall House and Estate

== County Cork ==
- Bantry House
- Bowen's Court
- Castlehyde
- Clontead More House
- Corkbeg House
- Doneraile Court
- Fota House
- Lotamore House
- Lotabeg House
- Myrtle Grove, Youghal
- Red House (Youghal)
- Vernon Mount

== County Donegal ==
- Ballymacool House
- Convoy House
- Horn Head House
- Mongavlin Castle
- Oakfield Demesne

== County Dublin ==
- Abbeville House
- Aldborough House
- Ardgillan Castle
- Belcamp Hall
- Delville
- Drimnagh Castle
- Drumcondra House
- Farmleigh
- Glenalbyn
- Hillcourt
- Howth Castle
- Kenure House
- Kiltalown House
- Lucan House
- Malahide Castle
- Manresa House, Dublin
- Marino House
- Newbridge House
- Old Connaught House
- Rathfarnham Castle
- St. Helen's, Booterstown
- St. Sepulchre's Palace
- Tallaght Castle
- Turvey House
- Tyrone House

== County Galway ==
- Ballynahinch Castle
- Castle Hackett
- Clifden Castle
- Eyrecourt Castle
- Lough Cutra Castle
- Tyrone House

== County Kerry ==
- Derreen House
- Derryquin Castle (demolished)
- Dromquinna House
- Dunkerron Castle
- Flesk Castle (demolished)
- Glanleam House
- Kenmare House (demolished)
- Killarney House
- Muckross House

== County Kildare ==
- Balyna House
- Ballindoolin House
- Barberstown Castle
- Carbury Castle
- Castletown House
- Harristown House
- Leixlip Castle
- Lyons Demesne
- Moore Abbey
- Straffan House now the K Club

== County Kilkenny ==
- Ashfield House
- Ballybur Castle, Cuffsgrange
- Bessborough House
- Bonnettstown House
- Bonnettstown Hall (Castle)
- Castle Blunden
- Castlecomer Demesne
- Castletown Cox
- Danesfort House
- Desart Court, near Cuffesgrange and Callan
- Drakelands House
- Foulksrath Castle
- Gowran Castle
- Grace's Old Castle
- Jenkinstown Castle
- Kilkenny Castle, Kilkenny City
- Mount Juliet House, near Thomastown
- Rothe House, Kilkenny City
- Shankill Castle
- Sheestown House
- Switzer's Asylum
- Webbsborough
- Westcourt
- Woodstock Estate

== County Laois ==
- Abbeyleix House
- Castle Durrow
- Emo Court
- Heywood House Gardens
- Stradbally Hall
- Sheffield House, Portlaoise (ruined)

== County Leitrim ==
- Glenfarne Hall
- Lough Rynn house

== County Louth ==
- Ballymascanlon House
- Barmeath Castle
- Beaulieu House
- Drumcar House
- Proleek MountPleasant Dundalk
- Ghan House
- Townley Hall

== County Limerick ==
- Adare Manor
- Currachase
- Kilgobbin House

== County Longford ==
- Coolamber Hall House
- Doory Hall

== County Mayo ==
- Moore Hall (ruin)
- Rappa Castle (ruin)
- Turlough Park House
- Westport House

== County Meath ==
- Allenstown House (demolished)
- Ardbraccan House
- Bellinter House
- Dangan Castle
- Dardistown Castle
- Dowth Hall
- Derlangan house
- Dunsany Castle
- Durhamstown Castle
- Headfort House
- Killeen Castle, Dunsany
- Rahinston House
- Slane Castle
- Summerhill House

== County Monaghan ==
- Dartrey House (demolished)
- Hope Castle
- Rossmore Castle

== County Offaly ==
- Birr Castle
- Charleville Castle
- Kinnitty Castle
- Leap Castle

== County Roscommon ==
- Clonalis House
- Edmonstown House
- Kilronan Castle
- Mote Park House
- Scregg House
- Strokestown Park

== County Sligo ==
- Classiebawn Castle
- Hazelwood House
- Lissadell House
- Markree Castle
- Temple House

== County Tipperary ==
- Abbeville, Tipperary
- Cashel Palace
- Castle Otway (ruined)
- Cloughjordan House
- Marlfield House, Clonmel
- Redwood Castle
- Slevoir House
- Knocklofty

== County Waterford ==
- Cappoquin House
- Castle Gurteen de la Poer
- Curraghmore
- Lismore Castle
- Mount Congreve
- Waterford Castle
- Whitfield Court
- Woodhouse
- Mayfield Manor

== County Westmeath ==
- Ballinlough Castle
- Belvedere House and Gardens
- Clonyn Castle (or Delvyn Castle)
- Gaulstown House
- Killua Castle
- Middleton Park House
- Tullynally Castle

== County Wexford ==
- Bargy Castle
- Borleagh Manor
- Castleboro House
- Courtown House (demolished)
- Johnstown Castle
- Loftus Hall

== County Wicklow ==
- Avondale House
- Bellevue House
- Blessington House aka Downshire House (post-1789)
- Baltyboys House
- Coolattin House
- Humewood Castle
- Kilruddery House
- Luggala Lodge
- Powerscourt House
- Russborough House
- Shelton Abbey

== See also ==
- List of market houses in the Republic of Ireland
- List of historic houses in Northern Ireland
