= Christ Church, Cork =

Christ Church
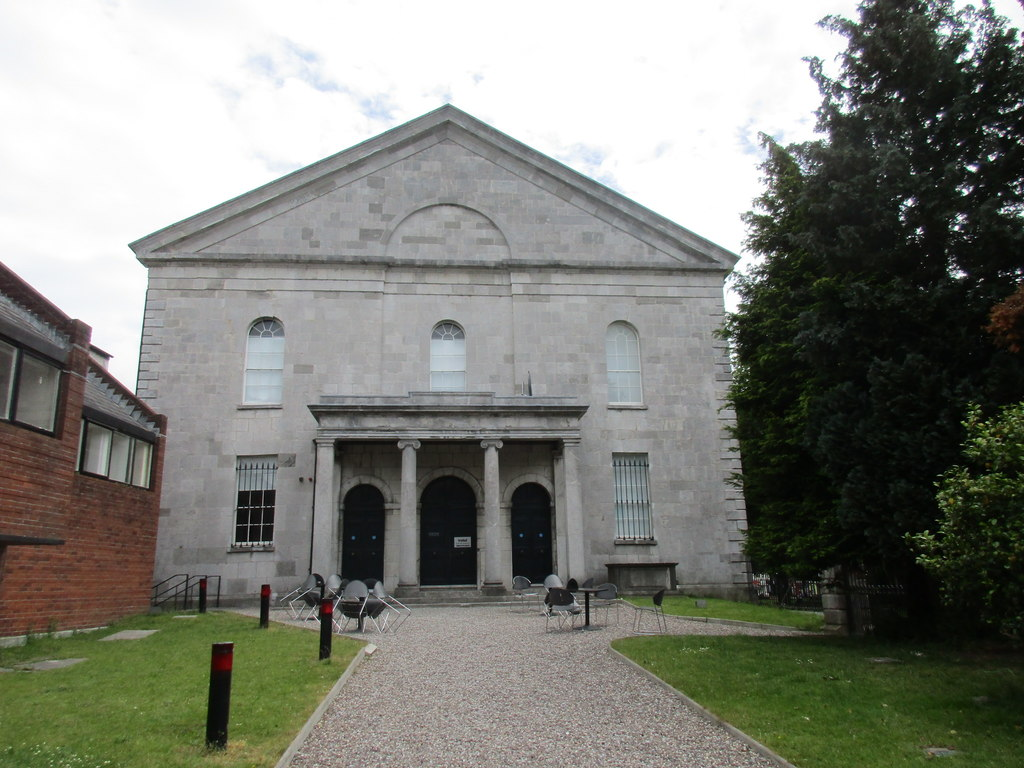
- Facade of Christ Church (Triskel Christchurch) on Cork's South Main Street
- Interactive map of the Christ Church area
- Alternative names: Holy Trinity, Christchurch, Triskel Christchurch

General information
- Type: Church
- Architectural style: Neo-classical Georgian architecture
- Location: South Main Street, Cork, Ireland
- Coordinates: 51.8974°N 8.4763°W
- Current tenants: Triskel Art Centre
- Years built: c.1050 – Hiberno-Norse church; c.1180 – Anglo-Norman church; c.1720 – Georgian church; 2011 – Arts venue
- Renovated: 1826 – Church renovation; 1877 – Church improvements; 2009 – Arts centre development

Technical details
- Material: Limestone ashlar

Design and construction
- Architect: John Coltsman (18th century construction)

Renovating team
- Architect: George Richard Pain (19th century renovation)

Christ Church, also known as Triskel Christchurch, is an early 18th-century neo-classical Georgian church on South Main Street in Cork, Ireland. Now used as an arts and cultural venue, the church and its graveyard are included in the Record of Protected Structures maintained by Cork City Council.

== History ==
The site has been home to several churches, dating to at least the mid-11th century, and Christ Church was listed among the possessions of the diocese of Cork in a 12th-century decretal letter by Pope Innocent III. The pretender to the English throne Perkin Warbeck was reputedly crowned in this church in 1497 and the Elizabethan poet Edmund Spenser married there in 1594. Christ Church, also known as Holy Trinity, was the "main church" in Cork city by the 17th century.

Substantially destroyed during the 1690 Siege of Cork, the remaining structures of the early medieval church were demolished in 1716 and the current neo-classical building was completed in the 1720s.

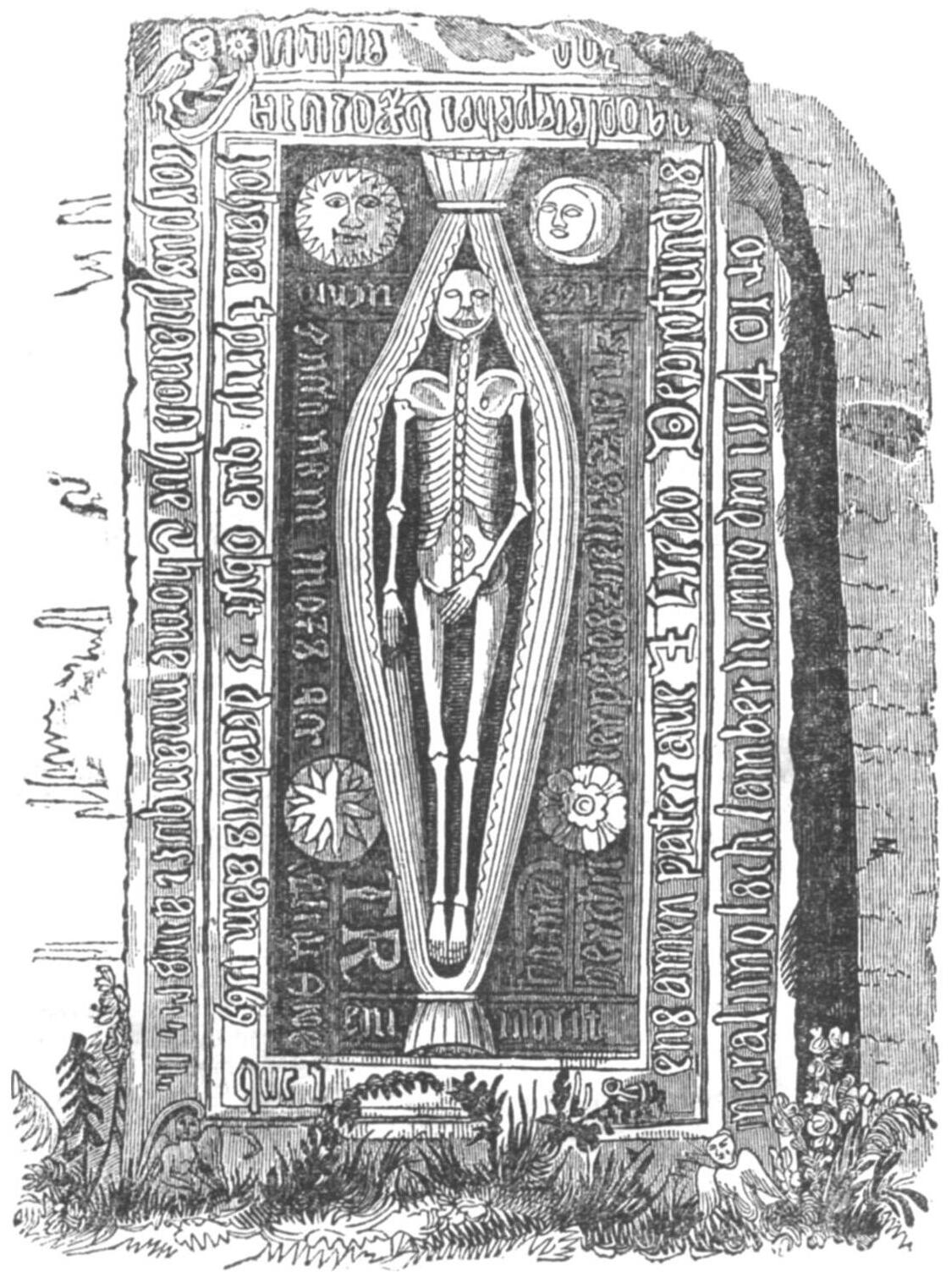
Monumental stone from the crypt for the 1549 Mayor of Cork, Thomas Ronan, rediscovered in 1815. (Dublin Penny Journal; 1833)

Originally designed by John Coltsman, the church was remodelled in the 1820s by George Richard Pain. Later works were undertaken by architect William Henry Hill. The church's 19th-century organ is attributed to T. C. Lewis.

Operating as a Church of Ireland church until the 1970s, the church was deconsecrated in 1979 and subsequently purchased by Cork City Council. The building hosted the Cork City and County Archives until 2005 when these were relocated to Blackpool. Between 2009 and 2011, the city council and the Triskel Arts Centre renovated and developed the building into an arts and cultural venue. The nave of the church is used as the centre's main auditorium.

== Notable people ==
Notable people associated with the church include:

- Neptune Blood, 17th-century church minister
- Edward Synge, vicar of Christ Church in the late 17th century
- Henry Browne Hayes, buried at the church in 1832
