= Henry Browne Hayes =

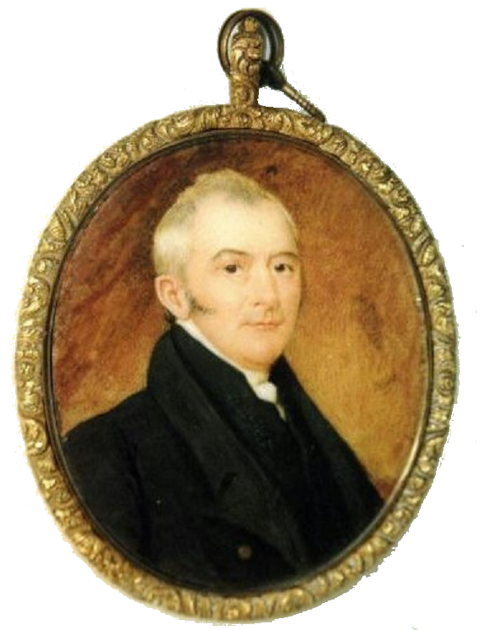
- 1820s portrait of Henry Browne Hayes, attributed to Cork-based artist Adam Buck
- Born: 1762; Cork, Ireland
- Died: 1832 (aged 69–70); Cork, Ireland
- Burial place: Christ Church, South Main Street, Cork
- Known for: Kidnap of Mary Pike; Association with Vernon Mount (Cork) and Vaucluse House (Sydney)
- Criminal penalty: Penal transportation to Australia
- Spouse: Elizabeth Smyth (1783–1794)
- Children: Three
- Father: Attiwell Hayes

Sir Henry Browne Hayes (1762–1832) was a landowner and Sheriff of Cork City in Ireland. Convicted of the kidnap of a wealthy heiress in Cork, he was subject to penal transportation to New South Wales in 1802 where he built Vaucluse House near Sydney. He was pardoned in 1812 and returned to Ireland. Surviving a shipwreck at the Falkland Islands on the return journey, he retired in Cork where he died in 1832.

== Early life and family ==
Hayes was born in Ireland, the son of Attiwell Hayes (d.1799) a wealthy brewer and miller. Henry Browne Hayes was admitted a freeman of the city of Cork in November 1782 and married Elizabeth Smyth in 1783. The couple had one son and three daughters. He was one of Cork's sheriffs in 1790 and was knighted in the same year.

== Kidnapping and trial ==
Several years after the death of his wife, in 1794, Hayes became acquainted with Miss Mary Pike, a Quaker heiress who had inherited between £20,000 and £80,000. On 22 July 1797, Hayes abducted her and took her to his home at Vernon Mount near Douglas. While a form of marriage ceremony was performed against Pike's will, she was rescued from the house by a number of her relatives.

Hayes fled and evaded capture for two years. A reward of £1000 was offered for his capture, and some accounts suggest that Hayes surrendered to a family friend so that he could claim the reward.

The trial, which began in April 1801, created much interest and was described as "one of the sensations of the day" with Hayes accompanied by "numerous and influential friends". The prosecution was led by John Philpot Curran. The jury found Hayes to be guilty and made a "recommendation of mercy from the required life sentence". The judge sentenced him to transportation to Australia.

== Penal transportation and life in Australia ==
Hayes sailed to Australia on the Atlas and arrived on 6 July 1802. Hayes, who travelled with a considerable sum of money, was arrested and imprisoned on his arrival in Sydney for "threatening and improper conduct" while on board.

Hayes was involved in freemasonry and, according to the Australian Dictionary of Biography, a meeting held by Hayes on 14 May 1803 is "regarded as the foundation day of Freemasonry in Australia".

Vaucluse House, built by Hayes in 1803, was later acquired by William Wentworth.

== Later life and legacy ==
Hayes sailed back to Europe in December 1812, surviving a shipwreck at the Falkland Islands. The vessel on which he sailed, the Isabella, also carried the United Irishman Joseph Holt and an account of their shipwreck can be found in the Memoirs of Joseph Holt.

After returning to Ireland, Hayes lived in the country for approximately 20 years. He died in 1832 (at the age of 70), and was buried in the Hayes family crypt at Christ Church in Cork.

A 2017 play, titled Sir Henry, was based on the life of Hayes.
