= Irish Hospitals' Sweepstake =

Irish lottery for financing hospitals

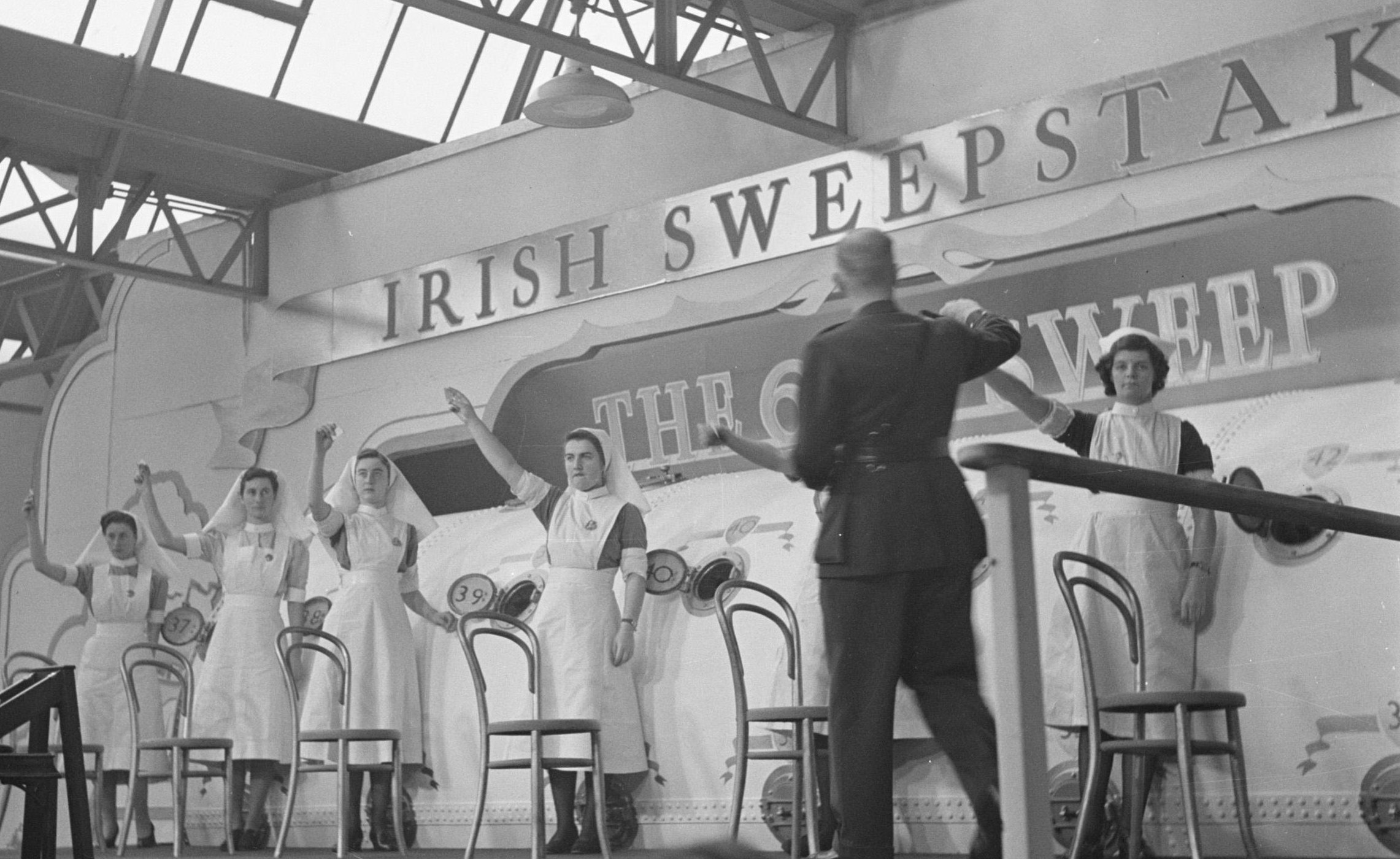
- Nurses holding up the drawn "Sweepstake Tickets" in 1946
- Region: Ireland
- First draw: 1930
- Final draw: 1987

The Irish Hospitals' Sweepstake was a lottery established in the Irish Free State in 1930 as the Irish Free State Hospitals' Sweepstake to finance hospitals. It is generally referred to as the Irish Sweepstake or Irish Sweepstakes, sometimes abbreviated to Irish Sweep or Irish Sweeps. The Public Charitable Hospitals (Temporary Provisions) Act, 1930 was the act that established the lottery; as this act expired in 1934, in accordance with its terms, the Public Hospitals Acts were the legislative basis for the scheme thereafter.

The main organisers were Richard Duggan, Captain Spencer Freeman, and Joe McGrath. Duggan was a well known Dublin bookmaker who had organised a number of sweepstakes in the decade prior to setting up the Hospitals' Sweepstake. Captain Freeman was a Welsh-born engineer and former captain in the British Army.

The ratio of winnings and charitable contributions to Sweepstake revenues proved low, and the scheme made its founders very rich. The Sweepstake administrators wielded substantial political influence, allowing the scheme to flourish before it was finally wound up in January 1986.

== History ==
The sweepstake was established to raise funding for hospitals in Ireland. A significant amount of the funds was raised in the United Kingdom and United States, often from the Irish émigrés. Potentially winning tickets were drawn from rotating drums, or tombolas, usually by nurses in uniform. Each such ticket was assigned to a horse expected to run in one of several horse races, including the Cambridgeshire Handicap, Derby, and Grand National. Tickets that drew the favourite horses thus stood a higher likelihood of winning, and a series of winning horses had to be chosen on the accumulator system, allowing for enormous prizes.

After the Constitution of Ireland was enacted in 1937, the name Irish Hospitals' Sweepstake was adopted and "Free State" was dropped.

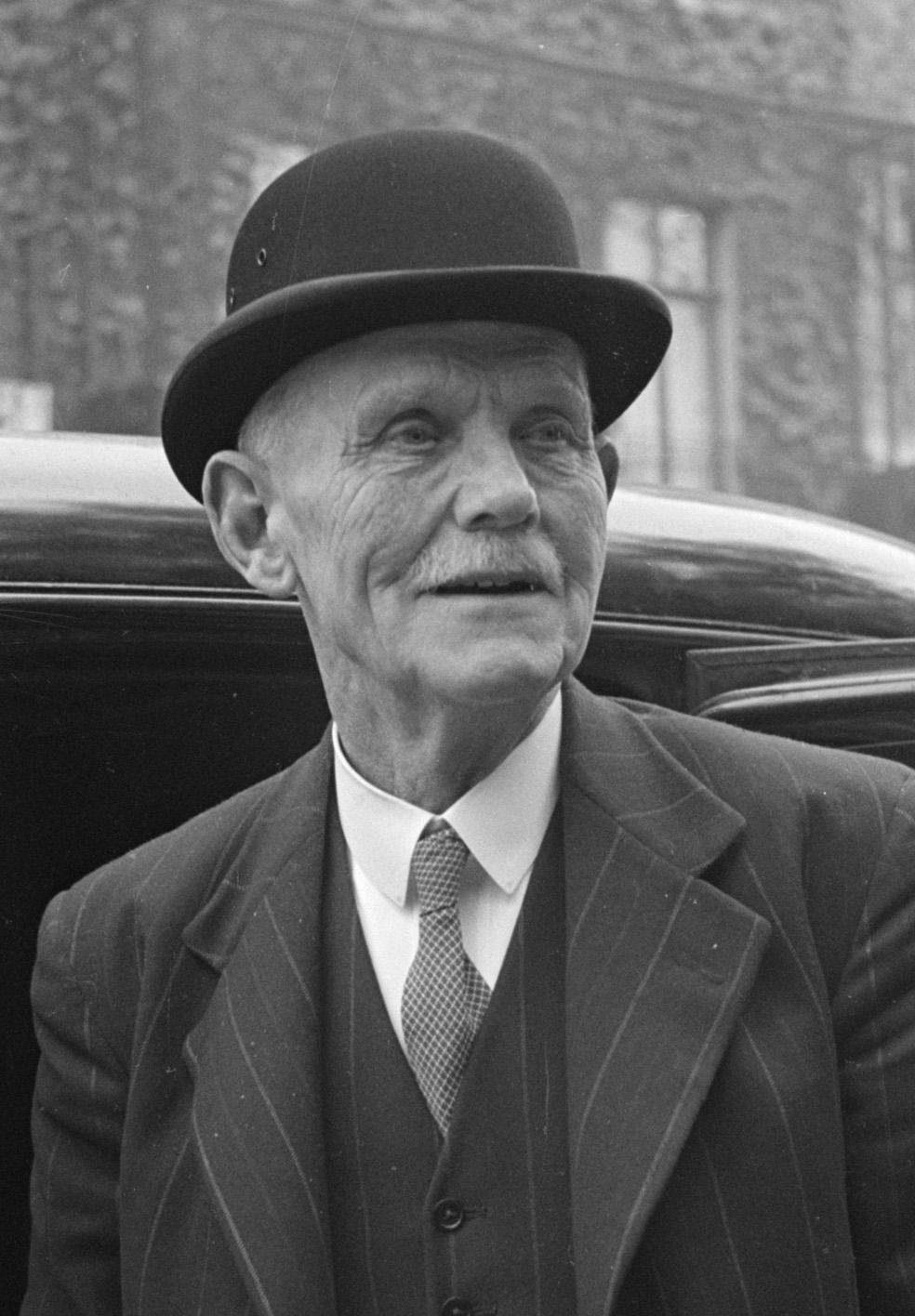
F. F. Warren, the engineer who designed the mixing drums from which sweepstake tickets were drawn

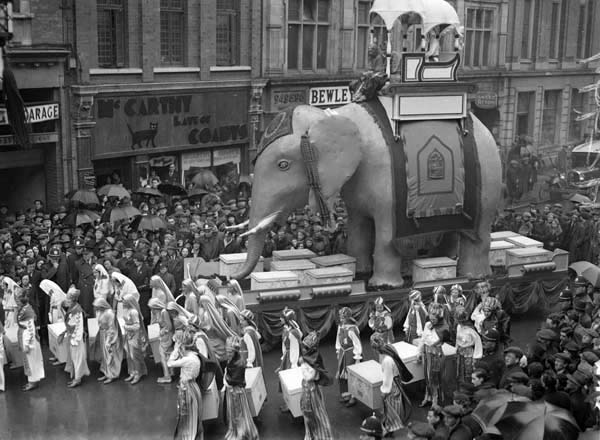
Sweepstakes parade through Dublin in late March 1935

The original sweepstake draws were held at The Mansion House, Dublin, on 19 May 1939 under the supervision of the Chief Commissioner of Police and were moved to the more permanent fixture at the Royal Dublin Society (RDS) in Ballsbridge later in 1940.

The Adelaide Hospital in Dublin was the only hospital at the time not to accept money from the Hospitals Trust, as the governors disapproved of sweepstakes.

From the 1960s onward revenues declined. The offices were moved to Lotamore House in Cork. Although giving the appearance of a public charitable lottery, with nurses featured prominently in the advertising and drawings, the Sweepstake was in fact a private for-profit lottery company, and the owners were paid substantial dividends from the profits. Fortune Magazine described it as "a private company run for profit and its handful of stockholders have used their earnings from the sweepstakes to build a group of industrial enterprises that loom quite large in the modest Irish economy. Waterford Glass, Irish Glass Bottle Company and many other new Irish companies were financed by money from this enterprise and up to 5,000 people were given jobs." By his death in 1966 Joe McGrath had interests in the racing industry and held the Renault dealership for Ireland beside large financial and property assets. He was notorious throughout Ireland for his ruthless business attitude and his actions during the Irish Civil War.

In 1986 the Irish government created a new public lottery, and the company failed to secure the new contract to manage it. The final sweepstake was held in January 1986 and the company was unsuccessful in a licence bid for the Irish National Lottery, which was won by An Post later that year. The company went into voluntary liquidation in March 1987. The majority of workers did not have a pension scheme.

The Public Hospitals (Amendment) Act, 1990 was enacted for the orderly winding-up of the scheme, which had by then almost £500,000 in unclaimed prizes and accrued interest.

A collection of advertising material relating to the Irish Hospitals' Sweepstakes is among the Special Collections of National Irish Visual Arts Library.

=== In the United Kingdom and North America ===
At the time of the Sweepstake's inception, lotteries were generally illegal in the United Kingdom, the United States, and Canada. In the absence of other readily available lotteries, the Irish Sweeps became popular. Even though tickets were illegal outside Ireland, millions were sold in the three aforementioned countries. How many of these tickets failed to make it back for the drawing is unknown. The United States Customs Service alone confiscated and destroyed several million counterfoils from shipments being returned to Ireland.

In the UK the sweepstakes caused some strain in Anglo-Irish relations, and the Betting and Lotteries Act 1934 was passed by the parliament of the UK to prevent export and import of lottery-related materials. The United States Congress had outlawed the use of the United States Postal Service for lottery purposes as early as 1890. Consequently a thriving black market sprang up for tickets in both jurisdictions.

From the 1950s onward as the American, British, and Canadian governments relaxed their attitudes toward this form of gambling and went into the lottery business themselves, the Irish Sweeps (never legal in the United States) declined in popularity.

== Cultural references ==
- The film The Winning Ticket (1935) is about a winning sweepstakes ticket that a baby hides and the drama of trying to find it.
- In Agatha Christie's novel, Death in the Clouds (1935), one of the characters, Jane Grey, a hairdresser, has won £100 in the Sweeps, so allowing her to be on the Paris–London flight on which the novel's action begins. Discussing her win later with another passenger, they "agreed together on the general romance and desirability of sweeps and deplored the attitude of an unsympathetic English government".
- The movie 36 Hours to Kill (1936) begins with a gangster trying to claim the money he has won in the Sweepstakes.
- In Evelyn Waugh's novel, Scoop (1938), the Sweeps are mentioned in connection with the protagonist, William Boot's, long-cherished wish to fly in an aeroplane: "[Nannie Bloggs] had promised him a flight if she won the Irish Sweepstake, but after several successive failures she had decided that the whole thing was a popish trick, and with her decision William's chances seemed to fade beyond the ultimate horizon."
- In the 1939 Columbia Pictures cartoon "Lucky Pigs," a family of impoverished pigs wins the Irish Sweepstakes. The pigs briefly enjoy their newfound wealth, before losing it all to tax collectors.
- The plot of the film Lucky Partners (1940) revolves around the purchase of an Irish Sweepstakes ticket by Jean Newton (Ginger Rogers) and David Grant (Ronald Colman).
- The Sweeps are mentioned in the film Rage in Heaven (1941), starring Robert Montgomery and Ingrid Bergman.
- In the film Cabin in the Sky (1943), Little Joe is offered $50,000 in exchange for his Sweepstake ticket, whose horse is favoured to win in the final draw.
- Cork Crashes and Curiosities (1945) is an Irish short film on car and motorcycle racing with Irish Sweep posters visible in several shots. In its RiffTrax commentary, Mike Nelson, Kevin Murphy and Bill Corbett assume that the posters are ads for a mysterious product called "Irish Sweep".
- In a skit titled "A Sweepstakes Ticket" in the film Ziegfeld Follies (1945), an indigent wife (Fanny Brice) learns via cablegram that she is the winner of the Irish Sweepstakes – only then to discover that her husband (Hume Cronyn) has given the ticket to the landlord (William Frawley) as a substitute for the $3 he was short on rent.
- In the film Three Strangers (1946), a glamorous but unhappy British wife (Geraldine Fitzgerald) persuades two strangers (Peter Lorre and Sydney Greenstreet) to join her at Chinese New Year in making a common wish before a Chinese idol to obtain the winning Irish Sweepstakes ticket for a runner in the Grand National horse race. Their ticket is drawn and their horse wins, but this success brings none of them good fortune.
- In the film Force of Evil (1948), about the legalization of a numbers racket, the Irish Sweepstake is mentioned as a model.
- In the cartoon The Emerald Isle (1949), a steak is found sweeping. When asked by the narrator (Jack Mercer) what kind of a steak he was, the steak (voiced by Sid Raymond) calls himself an Irish Sweepsteak, a reference to the Irish Sweepstake.
- In the 1954 episode of I Love Lucy titled "Bonus Bucks", Lucy tells Ricky about her near-misses at winning money, in part, by saying "Five years in a row I didn't win the Irish Sweepstakes".
- Robert Heinlein mentions the Irish Sweeps in his novella, The Man Who Sold the Moon (1950). In his novel Glory Road (1963) it plays a central part in the early chapters: the protagonist accumulates many lottery tickets through playing poker, one of which carries a winning number. When he looks into the possibility of selling this ticket before the race he discovers a curious fact about it, which alters the course of the story.
- In the 1958 episode "Post Mortem" of Alfred Hitchcock Presents (series 3, episode 33) a woman finds out that she'd buried her first husband with a winning ticket in his suit pocket. For some reason her second husband doesn't want the body dug up.
- An April 1963 episode of I've Got a Secret featured a woman who had won $140,000 in the Irish Sweepstakes: in response to a panelist's question, the woman noted that approximately $100,000 of her winnings would be taken by the Internal Revenue Service, to which host Garry Moore observed that for "a $3 ticket," $40,000 still represented substantial winnings.
- In October 1964, Bub on My Three Sons wins the sweepstakes and takes his family on a two-episode trip to Ireland.
- In the February 1965 Hazel episode, "Bonnie Boy", Hazel buys her boss, George Baxter, a winning Sweepstakes ticket not knowing that he'd been recently appointed to the city's anti-gambling committee that was specifically homing in on sweepstakes sales.
- In her collection of poems titled Transformations (1971), Anne Sexton mentions the Irish Sweepstakes in the first stanza of "Cinderella".
- In Happy Days season 3 episode 8 (1975), Richard Cunningham notes that his father "almost won the Irish Sweepstake".
- In Stephen King's novel The Stand (1978), William Starkey mentions the Irish Sweepstakes in reference to the start of the flu pandemic. "Anyway, Cindy, what I'm trying to say is that this was a chain of coincidence on the order of winning the Irish Sweepstakes."
- In a 1978 episode of The Love Boat, Harry Morgan's character jokes to his wife that he could afford their passage after winning the Irish Sweepstakes.
- In the 1981 episode of WKRP in Cincinnati titled "Out to Lunch", Johnny and Venus hand out Irish Sweepstakes tickets to the employees of the station as gifts from a record company rep.
- In the 1983 episode of Fantasy Island titled "The Winning Ticket" Tattoo wins a million dollar Irish Sweepstakes by being the best friend of the newly deceased winner.
- In Frederick Exley's semi-autobiographical final novel, Last Notes From Home (1988), the author/protagonist encounters the bullying Irishman Jimmy Seamus Finbarr O'Twoomey, who is employed by the public relations firm responsible for promoting the Irish Sweepstakes.
- In the 2006 episode of NCIS titled "Family Secret", Dr Mallard says "I once wagered a five hundred-to-one on the Irish Sweepstakes."
- In the 2012 episode of Breaking Bad titled "Madrigal", Saul Goodman tells Walter White that, regarding Walt's luck, "you're alive, as far as I'm concerned, that's the Irish sweepstakes."

== See also ==
- Isaac Wunder order - a type of Irish legal case law that arose after a vexatious litigant instigated numerous unmerited legal proceedings against the Irish Hospitals' Sweepstake
