= Australian Rules Football League of Ireland =

- Sport: Australian Rules Football
- Founded: 2001
- No. of teams: 4(men's), 5(women's)
- Country: Ireland
- Headquarters: Dublin, Republic of Ireland
- Most recent champion: Leeside Lions
- Most titles: Leeside Lions (7 premierships)
- Sponsor: Jeep
- Website: aflireland.ie

The Australian Rules Football League of Ireland (ARFLI) is an Australian rules football competition and is the governing body of Australian Football in Ireland. Ireland was ranked the number three country in Australian football outside of Australia in 2017.

The league is an international affiliate of the Australian Football League and a founding member of the European governing body, AFL Europe. The league is not affiliated with the Gaelic Athletic Association or the International Rules Series.

== History ==
The ARFLI was formed in October 2000 after the first ever Irish Grand Final was contested between Dublin Demons and Belfast Redbacks.

The Demons then travelled to London in April 2000, where they took part in the FSS Cup - BARFL’s (British Australian Rules Football League) pre-season competition. The Dublin lads finished third out of twelve teams in their first real competitive games and people sat up and took notice that Aussie Rules had arrived in the Emerald Isle.

From the early days, ARFLI’s co-founders Currane and O ‘Headhra were also heavily involved with developing relations with other leagues.

== Former clubs ==
- Drogheda Dockers
- Dublin Eagles (renamed South Dublin Swans in 2006)
- Galway Tribesmen
- Midwest Magpies (renamed Galway Magpies in 2012)
- Clare Crows
- Midland Tigers
- Dublin Saints
- Dublin Demons
- North Leinster Giants

(Note:: Midland Tigers and Saints merged during the 2011 Season under the name Kangaroos. For the 2012 Season following an affiliation with Greater Western Sydney, the Kangaroos became the North Leinster Giants.)

== See also ==
- List of Australian rules football leagues outside Australia
