= Mary Pike =

- Born: 1776; Cork, Ireland
- Died: 1832 (aged 55–56)

Mary Pike (1776 – 1832) was an Irish quaker heiress who was abducted by Sir Henry Browne Hayes.

== Early life and family ==
Mary Pike was born in 1776, the only surviving daughter of Samuel Pike and Catherine née Hutchinson. Her father was in business with his older brother Ebenezer with a family bank in Cork city which was established in around 1770. The details of Pike's early life are not recorded. After the death of her father in 1796, she inherited £20,000. She moved out of the city to live with the family of Cooper Penrose, a brother of her aunt Anne, at Woodhill. It appears that she became estranged from her mother, possibly over religion. Penrose was expelled from the Society of Friends due to his indulgence in avaricious leisure pursuits.

== Abduction ==
Pike was abducted by Sir Henry Browne Hayes on 22 July 1797, using a forged letter from her mother's physician claiming that her mother was gravely ill and requesting her presence. He ambushed and kidnapped her on the road from Woodhill. Bringing her to Vernon Mount, his residence, Hayes and his sister forced Pike into a marriage ceremony, which Pike resisted strongly. Her uncle, Richard, discovered that Pike was at Vernon Mount, rescued her. He put up a reward for the capture of Hayes and his accomplices, on top of the government offering of £1,000. Despite living in the vicinity of Cork, Hayes remained at large. He wrote to Pike to offer his surrender himself for trial if the reward was rescinded. He was finally brought before the Cork spring assizes on 13 April 1801, prosecuted by John Philpot Curran, with Hayes being sentenced to transportation to Botany Bay.

Pike was deeply affected by the abduction, appearing to have "developed a pathological fear of the male sex" and lived in a quaker retreat. Other reports state that she was admitted to a mental institution. She died in 1832 with a fortune of £55,000.
