= Lotabeg House =

Historic house in County Cork

Coordinates: 51°54′22″N 8°24′58″W

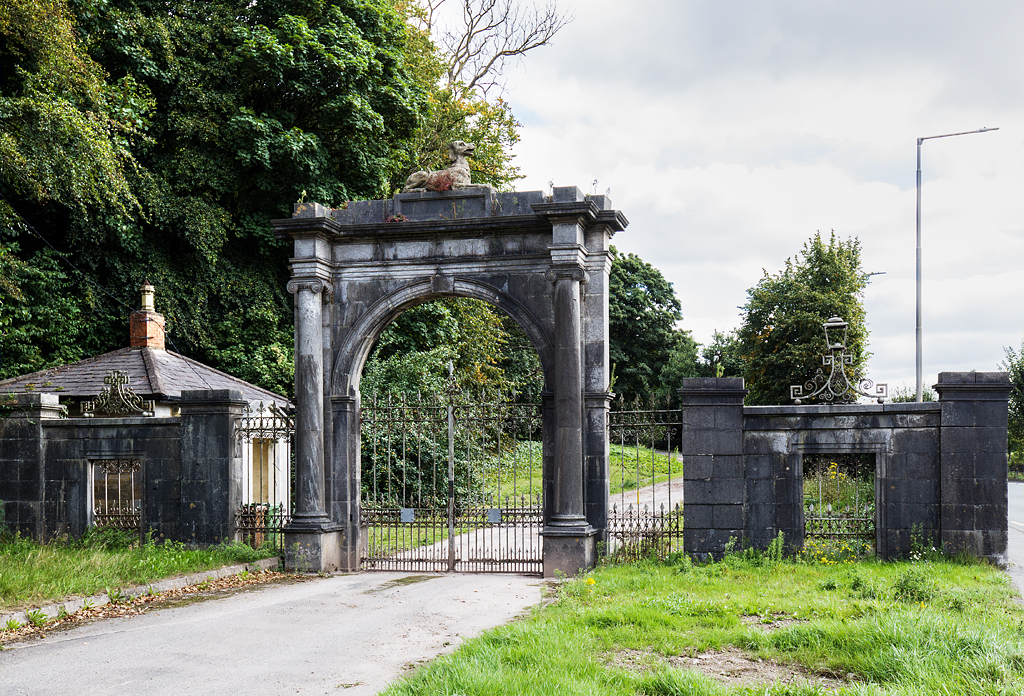
- The entrance gate to Lotabeg House, topped by an Irish Wolfhound, was designed by GR Pain
- Interactive map of the Lotabeg House area

General information
- Location: Lotabeg (near Tivoli), Cork, Ireland
- Years built: c. 1800

Design and construction
- Architect: Abraham Hargrave

Lotabeg House is a historic house in Cork, Ireland, used as a residence by Cork merchant families, built between 1780 and 1820. The house, gate lodge and entrance are protected structures.

== House ==
As with nearby Lotamore, the lands at Lotabeg were historically associated with the Galwey family.

Lotabeg House itself was constructed between 1780 and 1800. It was designed by Abraham Hargrave and built for Sir Richard Kellett, first baronet. Designed as a seven-bay two-storey house, with a basement, its main reception rooms are south-facing and overlook the River Lee. The main entrance is on the north elevation. The house, which was built with a domed hallway and a cantilever staircase, has six bedrooms.

Lotabeg House was occupied for a period by the Mahony family, who were also associated with the nearby Lotamore House. Another resident of the house, Daniel Callaghan, was a member of parliament for the Cork City Parliamentary constituency until his death from cholera in 1849.

The last owner to live in the house was Vincent Hart who died in 1939. Hart, an engineer, served with the British empire in India from 1903 and returned in 1936 to a newly independent country. When Hart died, the house remained unchanged, minded by his wife Evelyn Hart and their descendants until the contents were auctioned in May 2016.

The house, and its surrounding 37-acre estate, was listed for sale (in several lots) in 2018. Sold in late 2022, a planned development of 101 homes at Lotabeg was refused planning permission in 2024.

== Entrance ==
The entrance, which was designed by George Richard Pain, is topped by an Irish Wolfhound. Known as 'Callaghan's Gate', it was designed to commemorate an incident where Daniel Callaghan (1786–1849) was saved from drowning by his dog.

== See also ==
- List of historic houses in the Republic of Ireland
