= Grace's Old Castle =

Historic castle and civic building in Kilkenny, Ireland

- Location within Ireland

General information
- Location: Parliament Street, Kilkenny, Ireland
- Coordinates: 52°39′15″N 7°15′13″W

Grace's Old Castle is a historic castle building in the centre of Kilkenny which has been extended to create the city's modern courthouse structure. It houses one of the oldest courthouses in the country.

== History ==
=== Castle ===
The current site of the courthouse in Kilkenny is on the site of the castle known as Grace's Old Castle. This was originally built by William le Gras some time before 1210, le Gras having been appointed constable and Seneschal of Leinster for life, and Governor of Kilkenny. Much of that original building was replaced over time though the family continued to use it as a private town residence until the building was leased to the State by the Constable of Kilkenny and owner James Grace in 1566. From that time, it began to be used as a gaol and by 1691 the building was in use as the County Gaol.

=== Court ===
The building first became a courthouse in 1792 when it was also used to hold sessions and assizes for the county. The Parliament Street Courthouse dates from 1786 so that from the 1790s the building housed the County Courthouse, County Gaol and City Gaol though it was also used intermittently for theatre performances, public meetings and elections.

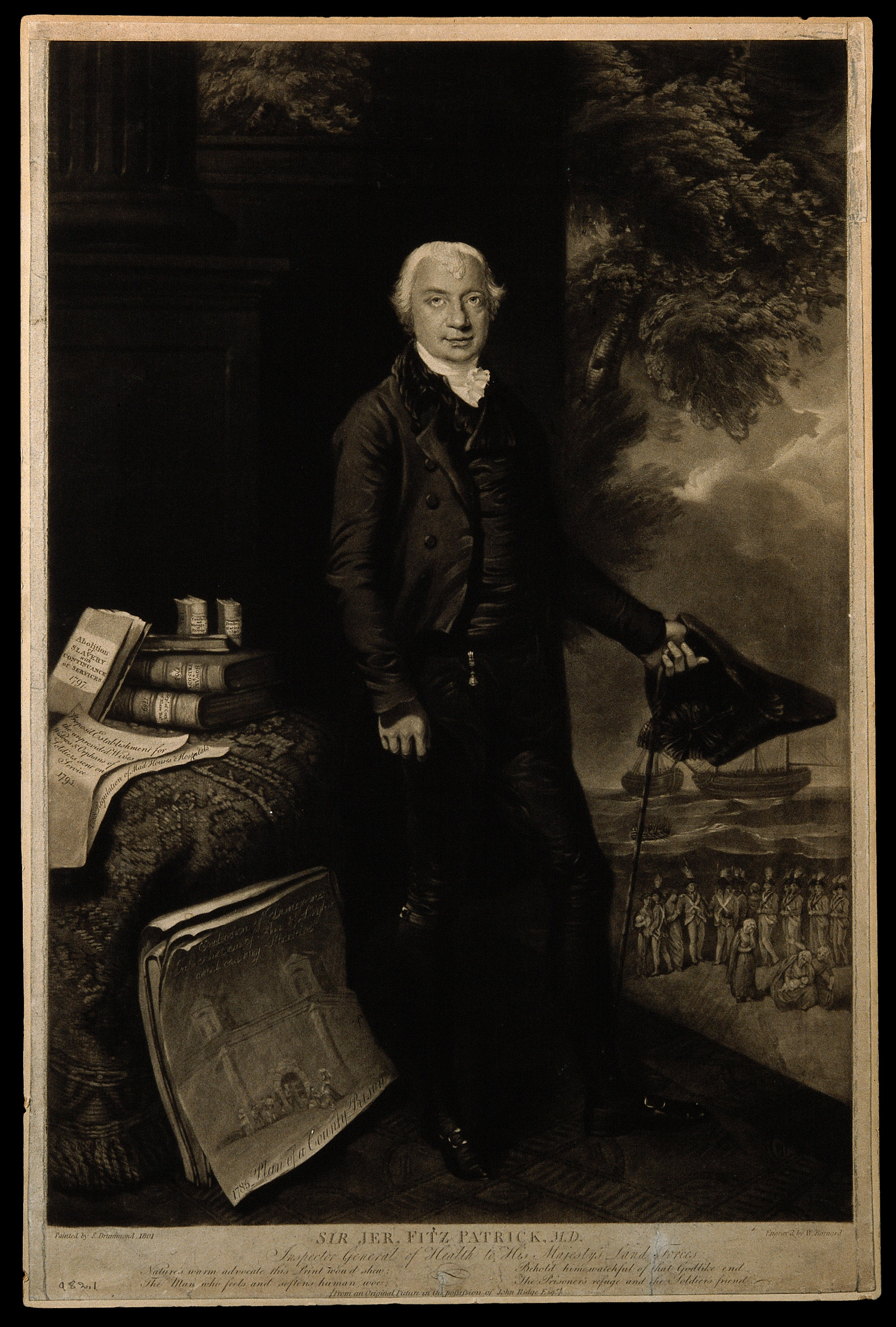
Sir Jerome Fitzpatrick M.D.

While it's believed that much of earlier remodeling work to transform the building was done by Sir Jerome Fitzpatrick, the current facade was constructed by architect William Robertson in 1824. As a courthouse the building still had seven cells for prisoners but was not considered to be well arranged as a modern gaol though it operated as the city's detention facility or bridewell from 1871 until 1946.

In the 1920s, a timber-lined ceiling'd council chamber was added to the back of the building. There have been continuous upgrades and remodeling works to the building since, with the most recent in 2010. As of 2010, the Courthouse holds the Circuit and District Courts.

== Excavations ==
In 2008, the area was the subject of an archaeological excavation by Maedbh Saunderson, in the course of which domestic medieval materials and burgage plots were uncovered, evidence of post-medieval structural development, as well as a prison burial plot and land drainage.

== See also ==
- List of historic houses in the Republic of Ireland
