= Tramore Valley Park =

Park in Cork city, Ireland

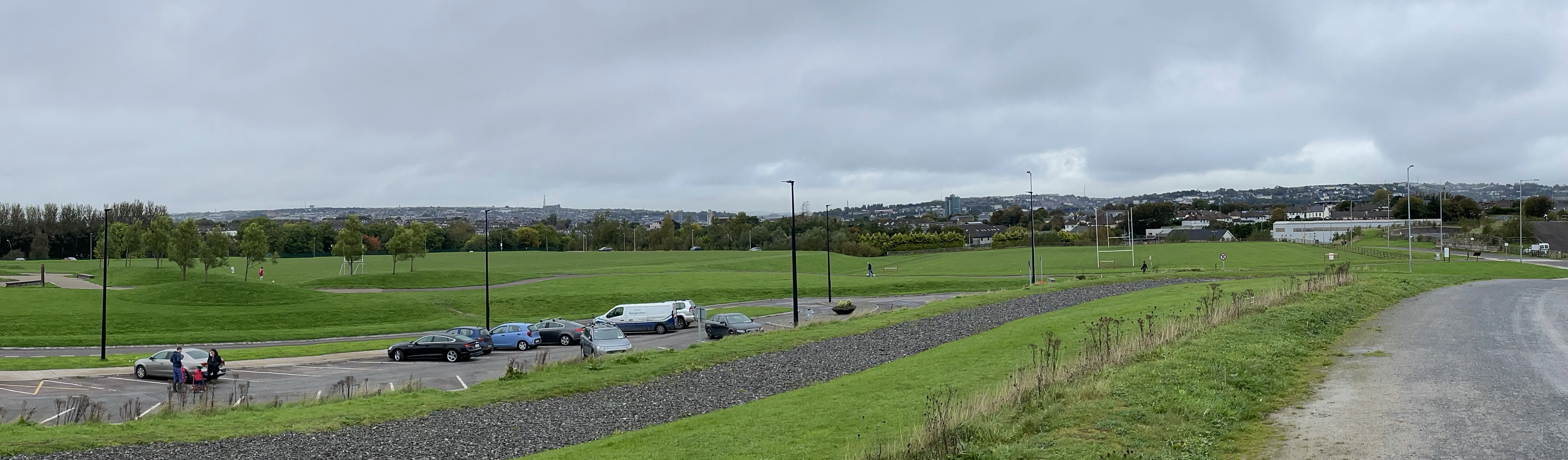
- Tramore Valley carpark, sports fields and BMX track
- Interactive map of Tramore Valley Park
- Type: Public Park
- Location: Cork, Ireland
- Coordinates: 51°52′40″N 8°27′33″W
- Area: 160 acres (65 ha)
- Status: Open

Tramore Valley Park is a park on the southside of Cork in Ireland. With an area of approximately 160 acres (65 ha), the park site is located on a landfill site which closed in 2009. While parts of the park opened in mid-2015 (including for BMX and parkrun events), and had been targeted to open more completely during 2016, the park was not completely opened until May 2019. It is managed by the Glen Resource Centre on behalf of Cork City Council.

== Development ==
The park was designed to have an area of 160 acres (65 ha), and was developed on the site of the city's former landfill, which ceased operation in 2009.

While parts of the park opened in mid-2015 (including a BMX track), and some events held in the park since September 2015 (including parkrun events), by late 2017, not all parts of the park had opened. While planned to open by mid-2016, by late-2018, access and parking issues had delayed the opening of the park on a broader scale or to larger events. Additional funding, to address these issues, was allocated in the Cork City Council budget for 2018, with a view to "open Tramore Valley Park [..] seven days a week before [summer 2018]". By late 2018 however it had been reported that at least a further €6m would be required "to provide full and safe access to the site", and that the opening would be delayed until 2019.

Following the opening of a pedestrian entrance onto the South Douglas Road and the addition of 400 car parking spaces, the park was officially opened in May 2019, with further enhancements proposed "in the coming years".

Following public campaigns, an additional pedestrian and cycling entrance was opened to the north side of the Park, on Half Moon Lane in 2021.

After 6-year break, a weekly parkrun event returned to the park in July 2022.

In 2022 a new pedestrian and cyclist link to the south of the park was approved. The new route officially opened in November 2023. The walkway and bridge connect to the Grange Road, and totals 1.5km in length. Cork City Council named the bridge after nearby Vernon Mount after a public consultation process.

A large-scale public art project, the KinShip project, has been running in Tramore Valley Park since 2021. As part of the project, an open shelter (known as "EcoLab") has been created in the park with the intent that it would host public events. The structure, described as the "first public building using rammed earth in Ireland", is roofed with reed thatch and based on the Irish vernacular cottage.

== Location ==
The park boundaries are broadly triangular in shape, marked on the south-side of the site by the South Ring Road (N40), on the north-west by the South Link Road (N27), and on the north-east by housing estates off the South Douglas Road. Neighbouring suburbs include Douglas, Turner's Cross, Ballyphehane, Frankfield and Grange. As Grange lies across a dual-carriageway, planning consideration was given for a pedestrian access bridge.

As of 2023, there were three access points to the park. These included regular vehicular access from the N27 South Link Road (opposite the Black Ash Park and Ride), with pedestrian and cyclist access from the south east via a walkway in Willow Park, Douglas and in the north of the park at Half Moon Lane. The latter pedestrian gate, included in the park's original plans, was opened in 2022. A fourth access point, via the Vernon Mount pedestrian and cycle bridge in the south of the park, opened in November 2023.

== Electricity generation ==
When completed, it was expected that almost €40m would have been spent sealing off the rainwater waste and harvesting any gas produced by the former landfill. It was planned to use this gas to generate 0.5MW of electricity - enough to power approximately 400 to 500 local homes. In 2012, Cork City Council and Naturgy Energy announced the commencement of energy generation from reclaimed methane gas. At the time of its development, the methane-fired combined heat and power generating station, was supplying 1.8MW of electricity, amounting to approximately 4% of Cork City's domestic power demand. This subsequently reduced to 1MW (2% of houses in Cork) and, as of 2015, the small plant could reportedly supply electricity to the equivalent of "500 houses on an ongoing basis until 2021". As of 2017, the site was expected to generate power "for another 3-5 years".
