= Lotamore House =

Historic house in Cork, Ireland

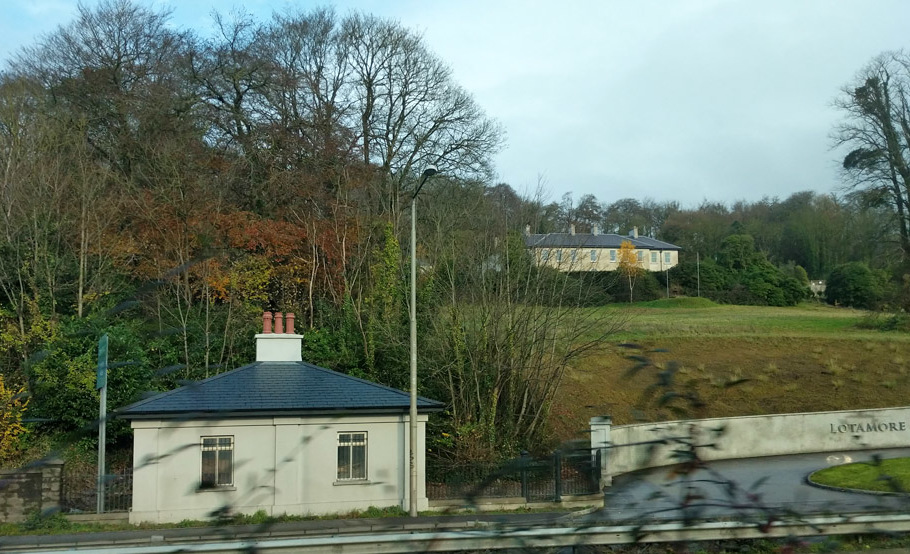
- Gate lodge, entrance and main building (right rear-ground) of Lotamore House

- Location within Ireland

General information
- Location: Lotamore, Rathcooney, Cork, Ireland
- Coordinates: 51°54′21″N 8°24′25″W
- Estimated completion: c.1780; 246 years ago
- Renovated: 1880s (extended); 2010s (renovated)

Lotamore House is a Georgian house in Cork, Ireland, which the residence of several Cork merchant families before being used by a number of businesses. Built c. 1780, the house was extended in the 1880s. Used as guesthouse for several years, by the beginning of the 21st century Lotamore House had fallen into disrepair. It was, however, renovated and reopened as a fertility clinic in 2017.

== House ==
The lands at Lotamore were associated with the Galwey family, whose family seat was at Dundanion Castle, since at least the first-half of the 17th century. By the late 17th century, the land belonged to John and William Galwey and was leased to Robert and George Rogers, detailed in leases dated 1694 and 1720.

Associated with the Rogers family of Lota into the 18th century, the central structure of the main house is a two-storey Georgian building built c. 1780. Located on a hill with views overlooking the River Lee, the house was extended in the Victorian 1880s.

The house was let to the Honourable C.L. Bernard in 1837 and Frederick Hamilton nearer the middle of the 19th century. Sir William Bartholomew Hackett was the tenant near the latter end of the century before the house was sold to the Perrier family, a merchant family of Huguenot origin, and later occupied by Martin Francis Mahony and his descendants. The list of names also shown as private residents includes Harrison, Hackett, Lunham and Cudmore.

After 1961 when the house was no longer a family residence, it served as the offices of the Irish Hospital Sweepstakes before becoming a twenty-room guesthouse which closed in 2006. Further development was halted with the downturn in the economy. Though the house was sold, the new owners went into receivership through Deloitte. There was a period when the house was occupied by a group, purporting to be a property trust, known as the Rodolphus Allen Family Private Trust. After a related court case concluded, and a number of squatters were removed, the house was eventually sold again.

Between 2013 and 2017, Lotamore House was renovated and expanded, and redeveloped as a private fertility clinic.

== See also ==
- List of historic houses in the Republic of Ireland
- Lotabeg House
