= Redmond Barry =

Australian judge (1813–1880)

Sir Redmond Barry KCMG, QC
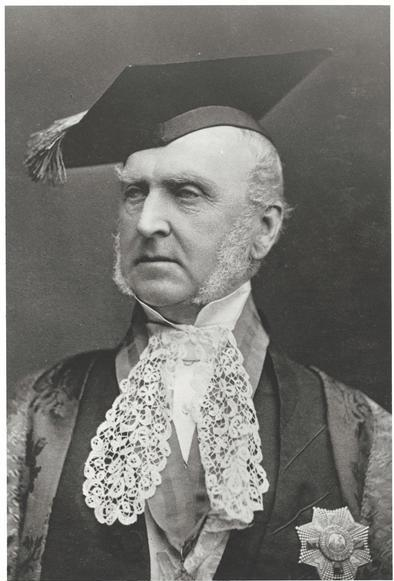

1st Chancellor of the University of Melbourne
- In office 1853–1880

Personal details
- Born: 7 June 1813 Kilworth, County Cork, Ireland
- Died: 23 November 1880 (aged 67) Melbourne, Colony of Victoria
- Occupation: Chancellor, judge

Sir Redmond Barry (7 June 1813 – 23 November 1880) was an Irish-born judge in the Australian colony of Victoria. A major figure in the early civic life of Melbourne, Barry was instrumental in founding several key institutions in the city, including the University of Melbourne and State Library Victoria, outside of which a statue of him stands. He is also well known for presiding over the trial of the Eureka rebels, as well as having sentenced the bushranger and outlaw Ned Kelly to death.

== Early life ==
Barry was the third son of Major-General Henry Green Barry, of Ballyclogh near Kilworth, County Cork, Ireland, and his wife Phoebe Drought, daughter of John Armstrong Drought and Letita Head. Barry had five brothers and six sisters and was educated at a military school, Hall Place, near Bexley, Kent.

Returning to Ireland in 1829, he was unable to obtain a military commission so began his own further education. Following his own classics programme, translating classical authors into English verse, he furthered his scholarly pursuits by reading a variety of old and new writers.

In 1832, he entered Trinity College Dublin, graduated in 1835 with the usual Bachelor of Arts degree, and was called to the bar in Dublin in 1838.

After his father's death, Barry sailed for Sydney, capital of the British Colony of New South Wales.

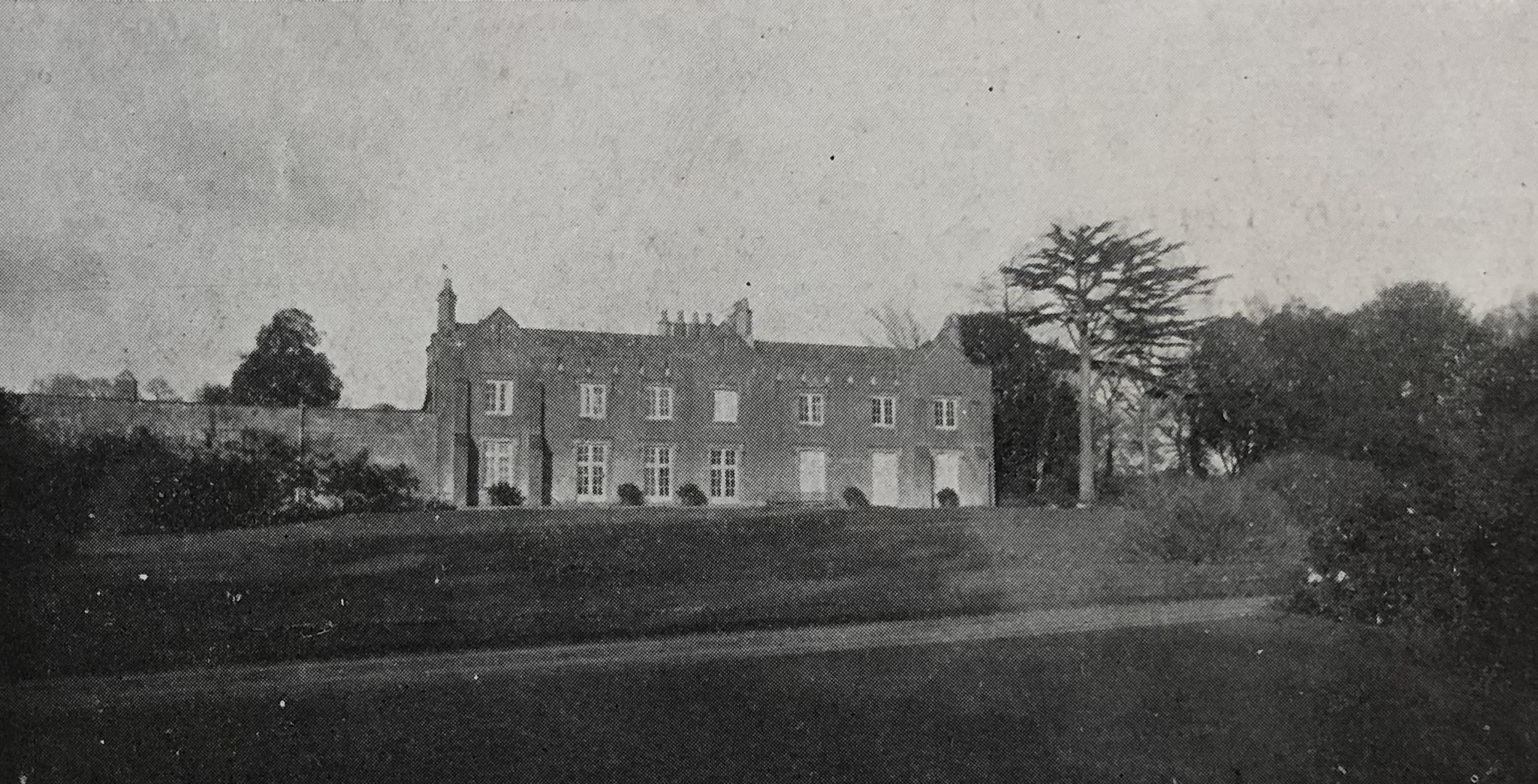
Ballyclough House, Kilworth. Birthplace of Redmond Barry

== Life and work in Australia ==
Barry arrived in New South Wales in April 1837 and was admitted to the New South Wales Bar. After two years in Sydney, Barry moved to Melbourne, a city with which he was ever afterwards closely identified, arriving at the new Port Phillip Settlement on 13 November 1839.

In 1841, Barry served as the defence lawyer for Tunnerminnerwait and Maulboyheenner, two Indigenous rebels on trial for murder. Barry questioned the legal basis of British authority over Aborigines who were not citizens and claimed that the evidence was dubious and circumstantial. Despite his best efforts, the two men were found guilty and subsequently hanged on 20 January 1842, becoming the first people in Victoria to be legally executed.

After practising his profession for some years, he became commissioner of the Court of Requests, and after the creation in 1851 of the colony of Victoria, out of the Port Phillip district of New South Wales, he became the first Solicitor-General of Victoria, with a seat in both the Legislative and Executive Councils. In 1852, he was appointed a judge of the Supreme Court of Victoria. Later he also served as acting Chief Justice and Administrator of the government.

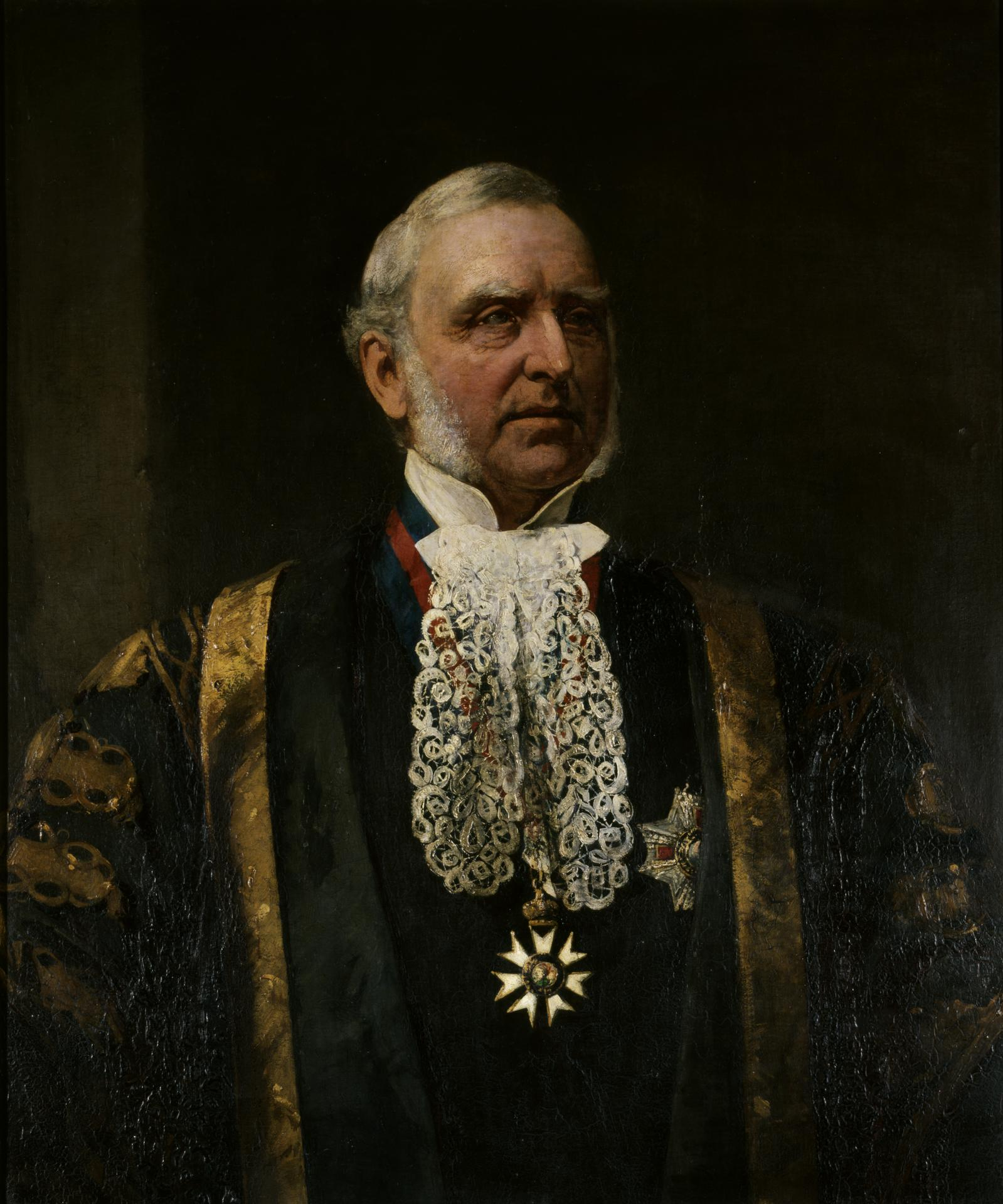
Sir Redmond Barry

Barry was noted for his service to the community, and he convinced the state government to spend money on public works, particularly on education. He was instrumental in the foundation of the Royal Melbourne Hospital (1848), the University of Melbourne (1853), and the State Library of Victoria (1854). He served as the first chancellor of the university until his death and was also president of the trustees of the State Library. He was the first President of the Ballarat School of Mines (1870), which later became Ballarat University and is now Federation University Australia.

Barry was the judge in the Eureka Stockade treason trials in the Supreme Court in 1855. The thirteen miners were all acquitted.

In 1857, Barry conducted the inquest into the murder of Inspector-General John Giles Price, who was beaten to death by a group of at least 15 convicts during an inspection of the prison quarries in Williamstown, Victoria. Seven of the convicts involved in the attack on Price were found guilty, and sentenced to death by hanging. The seven men were executed at Melbourne Gaol within a three-day period from 28 to 30 April.

He chaired the committee for the Victorian Intercolonial Exhibition in Melbourne, and represented Victoria at the London International Exhibition of 1862 and at the Philadelphia Exhibition of 1876. He was made a knight bachelor in 1860, and was created a Knight Commander of the Order of St Michael and St George (KCMG) in 1877.

=== Kelly cases ===
In October 1878, at Beechworth court, Barry presided over a case in which Mrs Ellen Kelly (King) and two men were accused of aiding and abetting the attempted murder of a Victoria Police constable named Alexander Fitzpatrick. After sentencing Mrs Kelly to three years with hard labour, Barry said, "if your son Ned were here I would make an example of him for the whole of Australia – I would give him fifteen years".

In 1880, Barry presided at the final trial of Ned Kelly, who was tried and convicted of murdering three other Victoria Police constables. The trial and sentencing have since been the subject of many articles and books by lawyers and historians. When he sentenced Kelly to death by hanging, Barry uttered the customary words "May God have mercy on your soul". According to the transcripts, Kelly replied "I will go a little further than that, and say I will see you there when I go." On 23 November 1880, only twelve days after Kelly's execution, Barry died from what the doctors described as "congestion of the lungs and a carbuncle in the neck".

=== Contribution to libraries ===
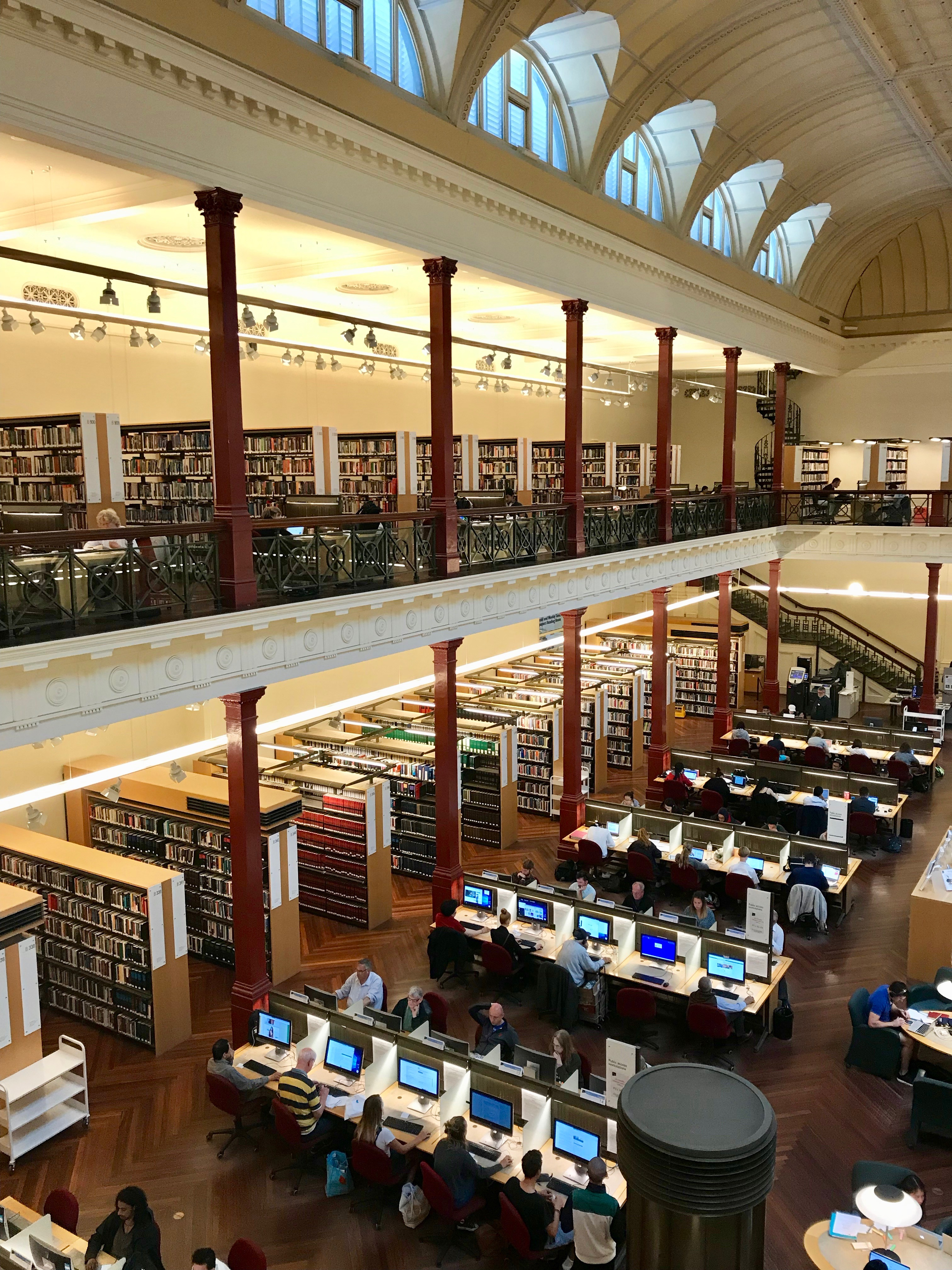
The Redmond Barry Reading Room in the State Library of Victoria

Barry laid the foundations of the Supreme Court Library (Melbourne) and was the prime mover establishing the Melbourne Public Library. As a legislator he promoted the Parliamentary Library. He organised the Governor, Sir Charles Hotham, to lay the foundation stones of University of Melbourne, Melbourne Public Library and Sunbury Industrial School [later Sunbury Lunatic Asylum] in 1854 – all on the same day.

Sir Redmond Barry virtually single-handedly planned the Melbourne Public Library building and its contents. He had a 'hands-on' approach personally writing book selection and acquisition procedures – even helping to shelve books for the Library's 1856 opening. In 1862 and 1877–1878, he went to Europe, England and America, purchasing books and pictures for University, Law and Public Libraries and Art Gallery. As Board of Trustees Chairman he was responsible for starting travelling libraries and supporting extended library hours. In September 1870, he "acquired" Marcus Clarke as Public Library Trustees clerk (later secretary), who until his death in 1881 worked as sub-librarian. Historian Geoffrey Blainey has said: "There can be fewer men with greater concern for and a greater and better vision for the young colonial society in which Redmond Barry made his life".

Books and reading were intrinsic to Barry's own educational and intellectual development, so he wanted these advantages for other people. The reason for his support of the Melbourne Public Library, the Law Library and his support of Mechanic Institutes was free access to libraries for all and not just a select few.

== Personal life ==
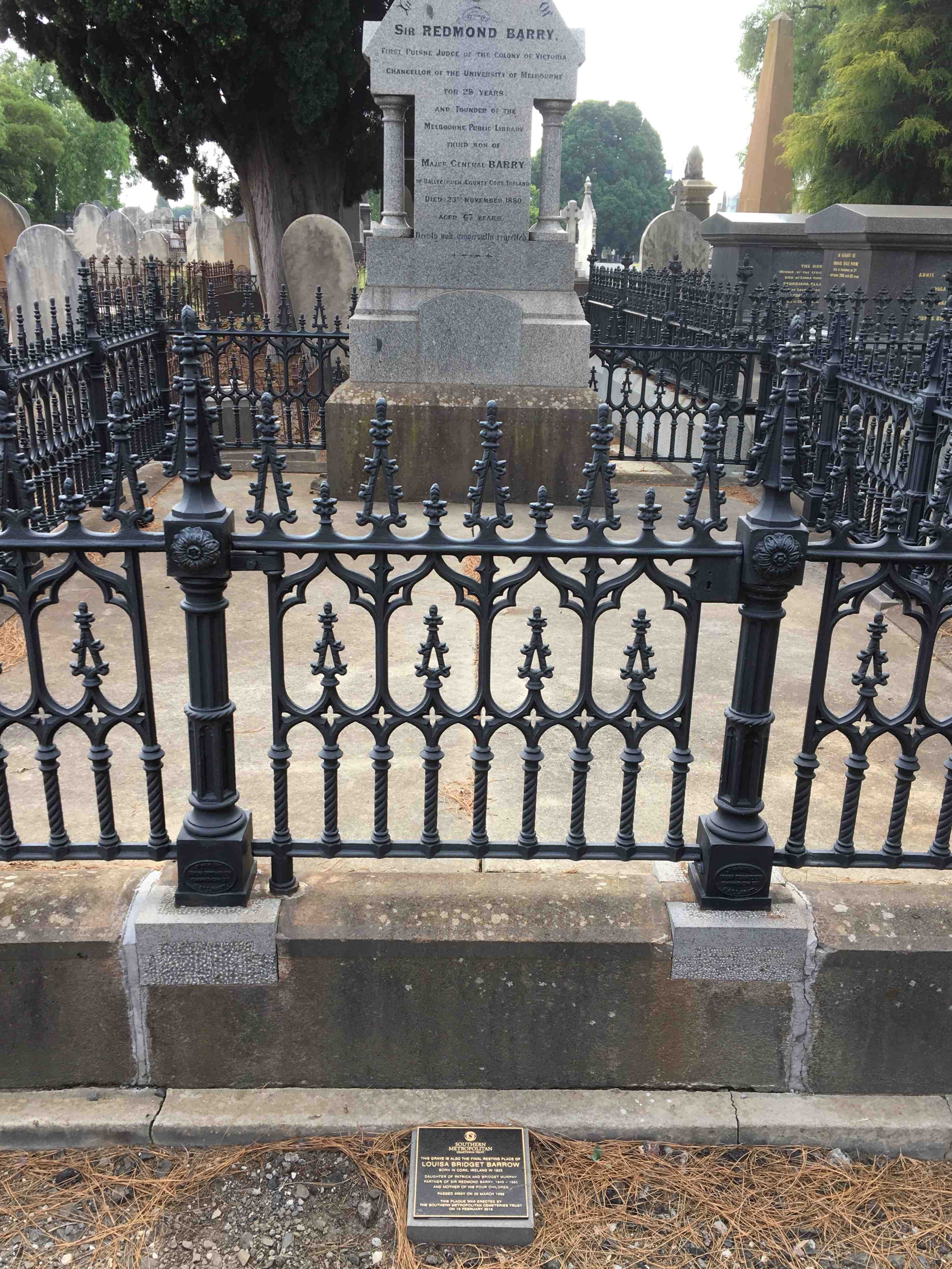
Barry's grave, with plaque acknowledging Louisa Barrow

Barry never married, but had four children with Louisa Barrow, all of whom he acknowledged and supported.

In August 1841, he was involved in a duel with pastoralist Peter Snodgrass, whose pistol discharged prematurely. Barry then discharged his own pistol harmlessly into the air.

== Death ==
The Argus reported that Barry had been suffering from diabetes for about ten years, but on his return from his trip to Europe and America it was apparent that the disease had affected his system. On Monday, 15 November, he was first troubled with a carbuncle on his neck.

Sir Redmond was counselled by his medical adviser to at once rest from duty, but he was reluctant to do so, and continued to attend the court until he was compelled to take rest. He was constantly attended by Dr Gunst, who, however, could scarcely impress his patient with a sense of the very serious nature of his disease, which he regarded somewhat lightly. He became restless, and it was deemed advisable to place him under the constant care of a nurse. Despite the precautions, Barry caught cold through exposure, and congestion of the left lung set in. Dr Gunst held a consultation with Dr Teague, and pronounced the case hopeless. The left lung had become greatly congested, and this, together with the exhaustion and wasting away of the system resulting from the previous disease, proved fatal.

Barry was a book collector and left a substantial library that was auctioned after his death.

== Memorials and legacy ==
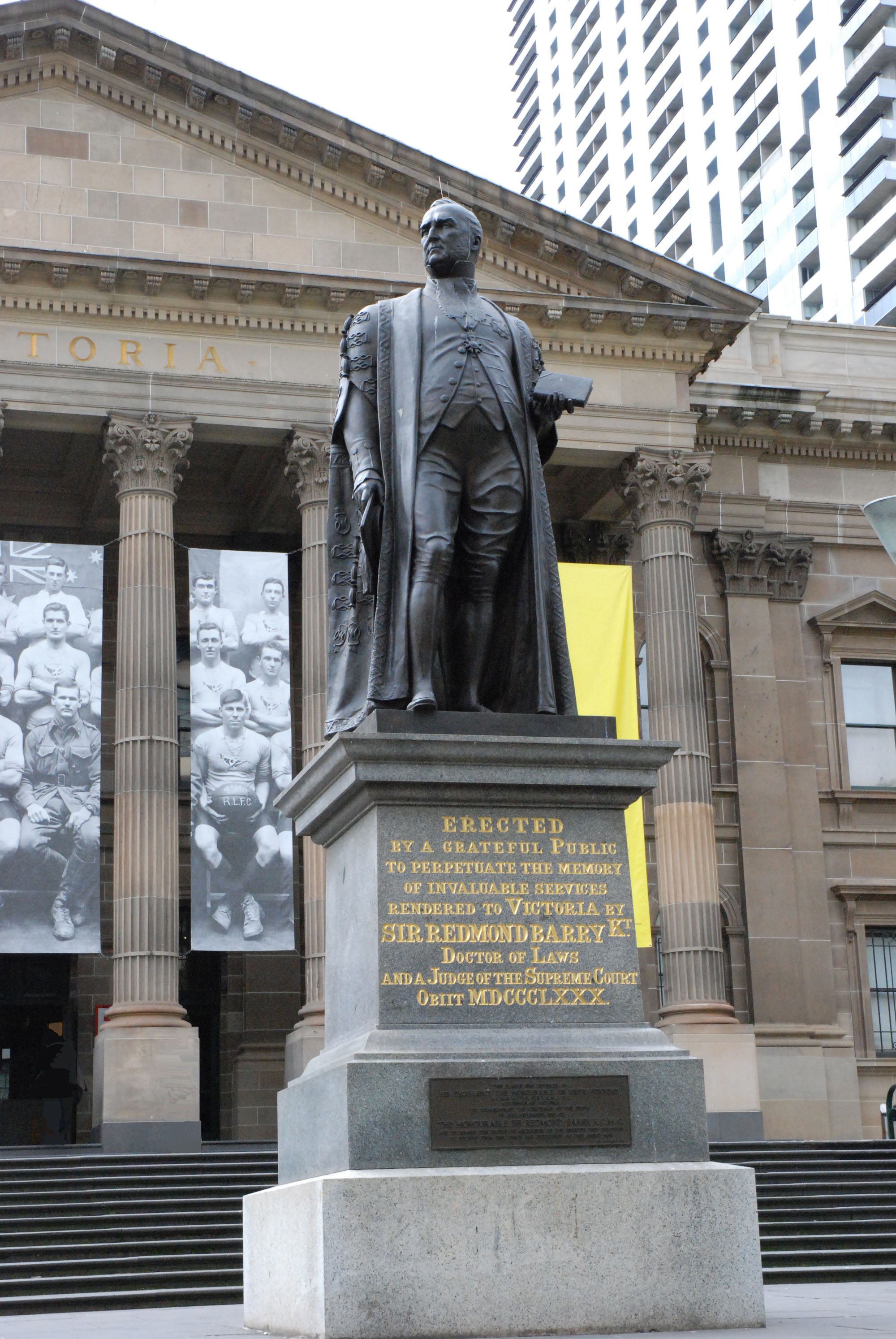
Statue of Barry in the forecourt of State Library Victoria

The State Library of Victoria has named a reading room after Sir Redmond Barry, who was the first chair of the Board of Trustees of the Melbourne Public Library. A statue of Barry was installed in front of the library in 1887.

The University of Melbourne, of which he was the first Chancellor, has a Redmond Barry building named for him. A plaque marking the location of Sir Redmond Barry's residence is located near the corner of Josephine Avenue and High Street Road in Mount Waverley.

The University of Melbourne also established the Redmond Barry Distinguished Professor, a title awarded to multiple professors within the university who display outstanding research and leadership.

The Australian Library and Information Association's highest honour that can be bestowed on an individual not eligible for membership of the association is the Redmond Barry Award awarded in recognition of outstanding service to or promotion of a library and information service or libraries and information services, or to the theory or practice of library and information science, or an associated field.

=== Portrayals ===
Barry appears briefly in the 1920 silent film The Kelly Gang played by the film's director Harry Southwell.

He appears in the 1923 silent film When the Kellys Were Out (1923), played by David Edelsten.

He appears in the 1970 film Ned Kelly, played by Frank Thring.

He appears as a minor character in Philippe Mora's bushranging biopic Mad Dog Morgan, where he is played by Peter Collingwood.

He has a prominent role in the 1977 television drama The Trial of Ned Kelly, where he was played by John Frawley.

He appeared in the 1980 miniseries The Last Outlaw, played by David Clendinning.

Barry's relationship with Marcus Clarke was the subject of the play, The Future Australian Race, written by Bill Garner and Sue Gore. The play premiered at the State Library's Queen's Hall in 2008, and starred Jim Daly and Luke Ryan as Barry and Clarke respectively.

Barry's career and relationship with Ned Kelly was featured in Shane Maloney and Chris Grosz's column for The Monthly, "Encounters" The story was later adapted in 2013 as an episode of the animated series Australian Encounters: Heroes, Villains and Ratbags, narrated by Geoffrey Rush.

In 2015, the band Bushwahzee produced a play with music entitled Barry Versus Kelly. The play takes place during the trial of Ned Kelly, and explores Barry's conflict with his own Irish upbringing and concerns that he will create a martyr out of Kelly. It originally premiered at Wangaratta Performing Arts Centre, and starred the show's writer Felix Meagher as Barry and singer Anthony Penhall as Kelly.

He appears in the 2026 update of Reg Livermore’s Ned Kelly The Musical. During the run at Her Majesty’s Theatre, Ballarat, he was played by Kiran Rajasingam. For the run at Union Theatre, Melbourne, he was played by Darcy Carroll.

== Works ==
- Address on the opening of the Free Public Library of Ballarat East, on Friday, 1st. January 1869

== See also ==
- Judiciary of Australia
- List of Judges of the Supreme Court of Victoria

Victorian Legislative Council
New creation	Nominated Member & Solicitor-General; July 1851 – June 1852	Succeeded by Edward Williams
Academic offices
New title	Chancellor of the University of Melbourne; 1853 – 1880	Succeeded by Sir Anthony Brownless
