= Vernon Mount =

Georgian manor house in Cork, Ireland

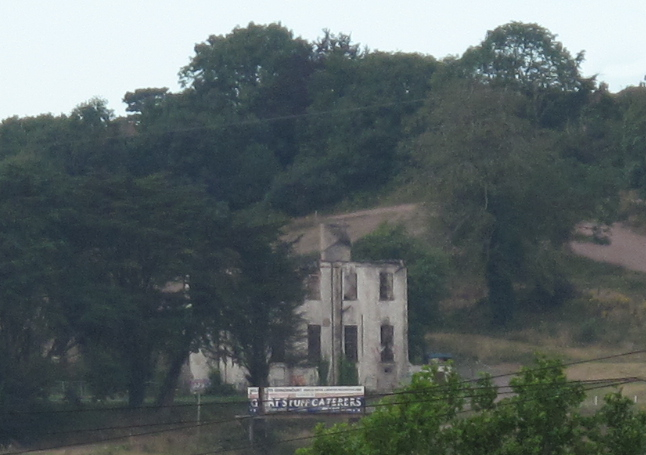
- Rear of Vernon Mount following 2016 fire

- Location within Ireland

General information
- Status: Derelict
- Type: Manor house
- Architectural style: Georgian
- Location: Cork, Ireland, Ireland
- Coordinates: 51°52′20″N 8°27′28″W
- Construction started: 1780s

Technical details
- Floor count: 3 (2 over basement)

Design and construction
- Architect: Abraham Hargrave (attrib)
- Designations: Protected Structure (RPS 480)

Vernon Mount (sometimes Vernon Mount House or Mount Vernon) is a ruined Georgian manor house in Cork, Ireland. It was built between the 1780s and early 1790s to designs attributed to Abraham Hargrave. Originally built for the merchant Hayes family, the house was named for Mount Vernon, the home of US president George Washington. Passing through several owners, the house remained largely disused and subject to deterioration from the late 20th century. It was included in the Record of Monuments and Places by the National Monuments Service, and on the Record of Protected Structures for Cork County Council. It remained largely intact until 2016, when a significant fire largely gutted the house, and the building was subsequently listed on the derelict sites register. In 2021, the building was subject to a funding request for stabilisation works due to "risk of collapse".

== Construction and design ==
Some sources imply that Vernon Mount was built in 1784, while others suggest it was completed after 1789 following the arrival of Abraham Hargrave in Cork. Hargrave designed a number of buildings in the city at this time, including Cork's military barracks. The house was built for and by Atwell Hayes (d.1799) a wealthy brewer and miller. Following the death of his wife, Atwell Hayes did not take up occupancy, but instead leased the estate to his son, Henry Browne Hayes (1762–1832). Browne Hayes reputedly spent significant sums on the interior of the house, including murals and other artworks by artist Nathaniel Grogan (1740–1807). Several of Grogan's works adorned doorways and other internal architectural elements, including a work depicting Minerva on a large curved ceiling. The curved elevations, staircase, oval atrium, and interior decorations made Vernon Mount, according to the Irish Georgian Society "unique in the history of the Irish villa and [..] a building of national importance".

== History and ownership ==
Following the death of his own wife, Henry Browne Hayes abducted a local heiress named Mary Pike, and in 1797 reputedly forced her into a marriage ceremony at the estate. Hayes was later convicted of kidnap, but had a death sentence commuted to penal transportation to Australia.

Passing through several owners, by the late 20th century the Vernon Mount estate was owned for a period by the Cork and Munster Motorcycle and Car Club. The club used the demesne for motocross and similar events. The house was sold to a private investor in the 1990s, though a planning application for redevelopment as apartments and a hotel was not successful. As of late 2021, the company that owned the building had reportedly been "dissolved".

== Today ==
The house was listed for protection on the Record of Protected Structures by the local authority, and also included in the Record of Monuments and Places. The Irish Georgian Society, World Monuments Fund, An Taisce and other stakeholder groups listed the building as a risk, and attempts were made to slow the effects of deterioration, roof damage, water issues and vandalism over a number of decades. Although in private ownership, public funds were allocated by the Department of Arts and Heritage which allowed Cork County Council to undertake roof repairs in 2012.

Despite recommendations for a compulsory purchase order, to bring the building into permanent state ownership and protection, a severe fire in July 2016 reduced the structure to a largely empty shell. Following the fire, there was some speculation as to the future of the house and site. In September 2016, Cork County Council voted in favour of prosecuting the owners of Vernon Mount for "fail[ure] to secure the protected structure".

In 2017, there were renewed calls to bring the site into public ownership, and to stabilise the structure with a view to preserving its shell. As of 2019, Cork City Council (the responsible local authority following the 2019 Cork boundary change) reportedly stated that the "strategy in relation to Vernon Mount" was "under review", but that it had no plans to consider a compulsory purchase order. In 2020 the building was reportedly placed on the derelict sites register, and members of the council subsequently advocated funding stabilisation works as parts of the building were "at risk of collapsing". Though further calls for compulsory purchase were made in early 2023, there were reportedly "no signs" of the site being taken into public ownership by March 2024. The site remained derelict and "falling apart" as of September 2025.

A footbridge, linking the area to Tramore Valley Park, was named "Vernon Mount Bridge" in mid-2023.
