= Abraham Hargrave =

English architect active in Ireland

Abraham Addison Hargrave (1755–1808), sometimes referred to as Abraham Hargrave the Elder was an architect and building contractor who was active mainly in County Cork, Ireland, in the late 18th and early 19th century. Born near Leeds, England, in 1755, Hargrave came to Cork between 1789 and 1791. Among his first commissions was the rebuilding of St Patricks Bridge in Cork, which had been damaged by severe flooding in 1789. Over the coming decades Hargrave was responsible for a number of merchant manor houses in the area (including Vernon Mount c. 1790, Lotabeg c. 1800, additions to Castle Hyde c. 1801, and works at Fota House). He was also involved in the development of several barracks (for example Cork Military Barracks c.1800 and Fermoy Barracks c.1804) and other works (including Christ Church in Fermoy c.1804, and at Belvelly bridge).

Reputedly a member of the Freemasons, some later commentators suggest that Hargrave incorporated masonic symbolism into some works attributed to him – although other commentators question this claim. Hargrave died at the age of 53 at Camden Place, Cork, in March 1808. A number of Hargave's descendants were also involved in architecture and construction, including his sons Abraham Addison Hargrave (died 1838) and John Hargrave (died 1833). The former was responsible for Cork's Custom House (later the Cork Harbour Commissioners headquarters) which was completed in 1818.
