= Ballyclough House =

Anglo-Irish Estate

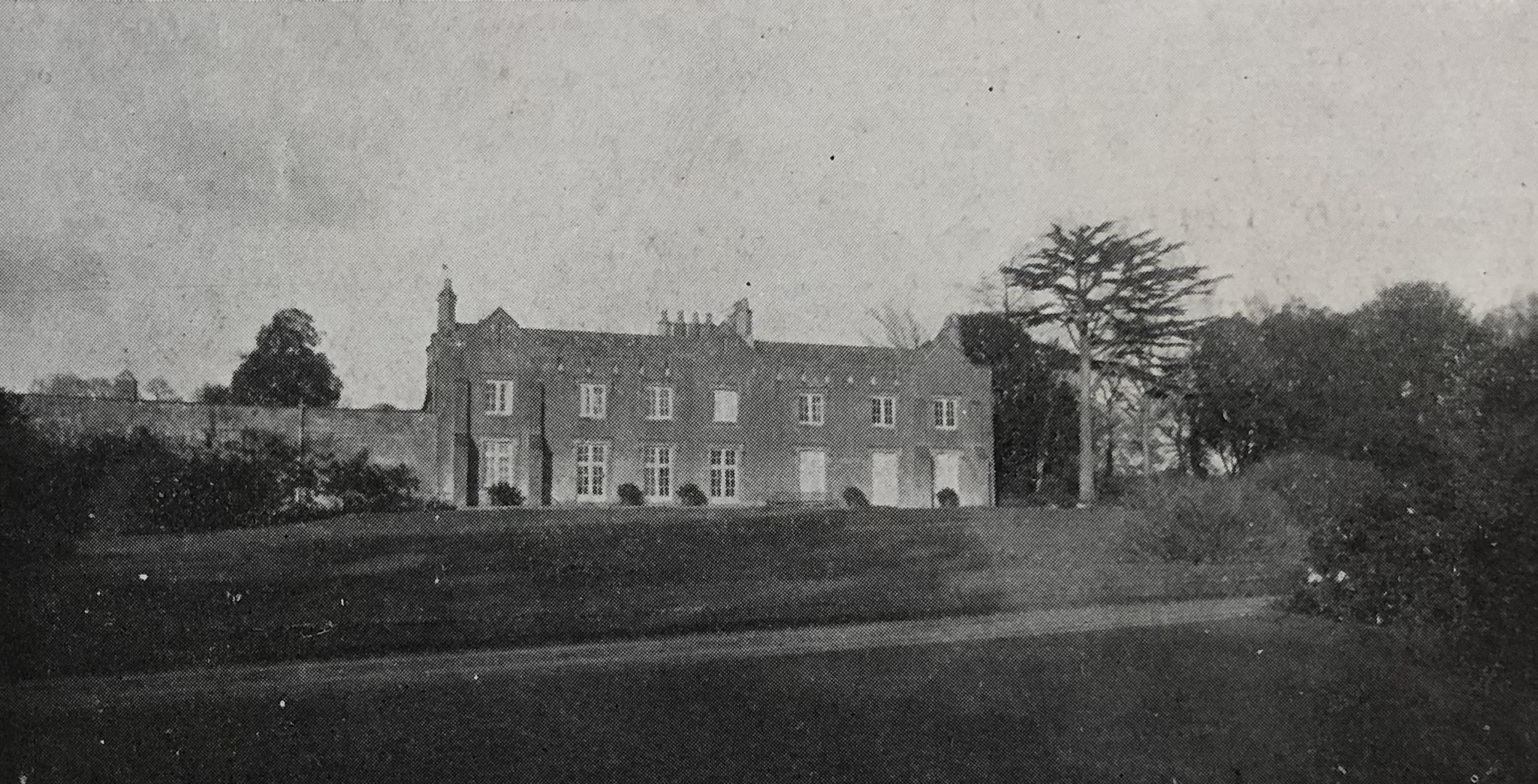
- Ballyclough House, South Elevation,1911.

- Location within County Cork Location within Ireland
- 52.1900°N 8.3099°W
- Location: Kilworth, County Cork, Ireland

History
- Built: 17th century

Site notes
- Architectural styles: Elizabethan, Gothic Revival

Ballyclough House, also known as Ballyclogh House, is an Irish country house built in the 17th century by members of the Anglo-Irish ascendency. It was the principal house of the Ballyclough Estate. The name Ballyclough is derived from the Irish, Baile Cloiche, which translates as town/townland of stone/stone building. There are a number of townlands and villages in Ireland of the same or similar name. While the form 'Ballyclogh' is used on Ordnance Survey maps, the form 'Ballyclough' was commonly used. Little remains of the original house.

== Location ==
Ballyclough House is located in the townland of Ballyclough in the north east of County Cork, Ireland. It lies between the villages of Kilworth, to the east, and Glanworth, to the west, with the River Funshion on its southern boundary. The townland of Ballyclough is in the Civil Parish of Glanworth, in the Barony of Fermoy. It comprises approximately 687 acres corresponding with the former Ballyclough Estate.

== History ==
1588 - Ballyclough was first mentioned by Grove White as being included in the grant of lands to Arthur Hyde.

1669 - Sir Nicholas Purdon was granted a large part of north Cork, including Ballyclough. Sir Nicholas's daughter Jane married Redmond Barry, the MacAdam Barry of Lisnagar, Rathcormac, a descendent of William de Barry. She subsequently inherited Ballyclough.

1734 - Ballyclough passed through several generations of the male line of the Barry family, including Redmond Barry, High Sheriff of Co. Cork in 1734, whose daughter Mary Catherine married St. Leger St. Leger, the 1st Viscount Doneraile second creation.

1812 - It was inherited by Major General Henry Greene Barry, High Sheriff of Cork 1821. Married to Phoebe, née Drought they had thirteen children, including Sir Redmond Barry. Their eldest son Capt. James J. P. MacAdam Barry inherited Ballyclough in 1838. His brother Capt. St. Leger Barry inherited in 1881.

1888 - James Robert Bury, grand-nephew of St. Leger Barry, inherited Ballyclough and took the additional name Barry by licence. He was High Sheriff of Cork, 1910, a Major in the British army and was appointed Officer, OBE. In 1901 the Irish Census lists the house as being occupied by his mother, Anna Maria, her second husband Capt. James Broadley RN and six servants. Sometime between 1911, when the Census shows Bury-Barry, his wife Judith née Ringrose Voase, their daughter and six servants in residence, and 1920, the family moved to Elvington Hall, Yorkshire and the house was used as a military garrison by the British.

1920 - The house was set alight by the IRA. The house and the estate were then acquired by the Irish Land Commission who divided the estate and partially demolished the house.

== Architecture ==
Built in the early 17th century in the Elizabethan style, it was a two-storey house. The south façade of the house comprised seven bays topped with crenelations and with buttresses at either end. The house was reroofed and refurbished by James Barry in the 1850s and 1860s due to problems with damp. In 1904 James Bury-Barry built a two-storey extension to the north side of the house with a ballroom on the ground floor and a Tudor-Revival staircase. This extension is of Gothic Revival design with a Tudor arch entrance and limestone pinnacles.

Curtilage

There is a large courtyard to the west of the house, which was connected to the western gable of the original house, a walled garden to the north of the house, a farmyard to the north-west and a thrashing mill. There were two driveways, to the south and east, both with gate lodges. The eastern side of the courtyard has the remains of a bread oven, with the remains of stables and coach house to other sides.

Demolition

In 1920 the house was bought by the Irish Land Commission who demolished the house apart from the 1904 extension.

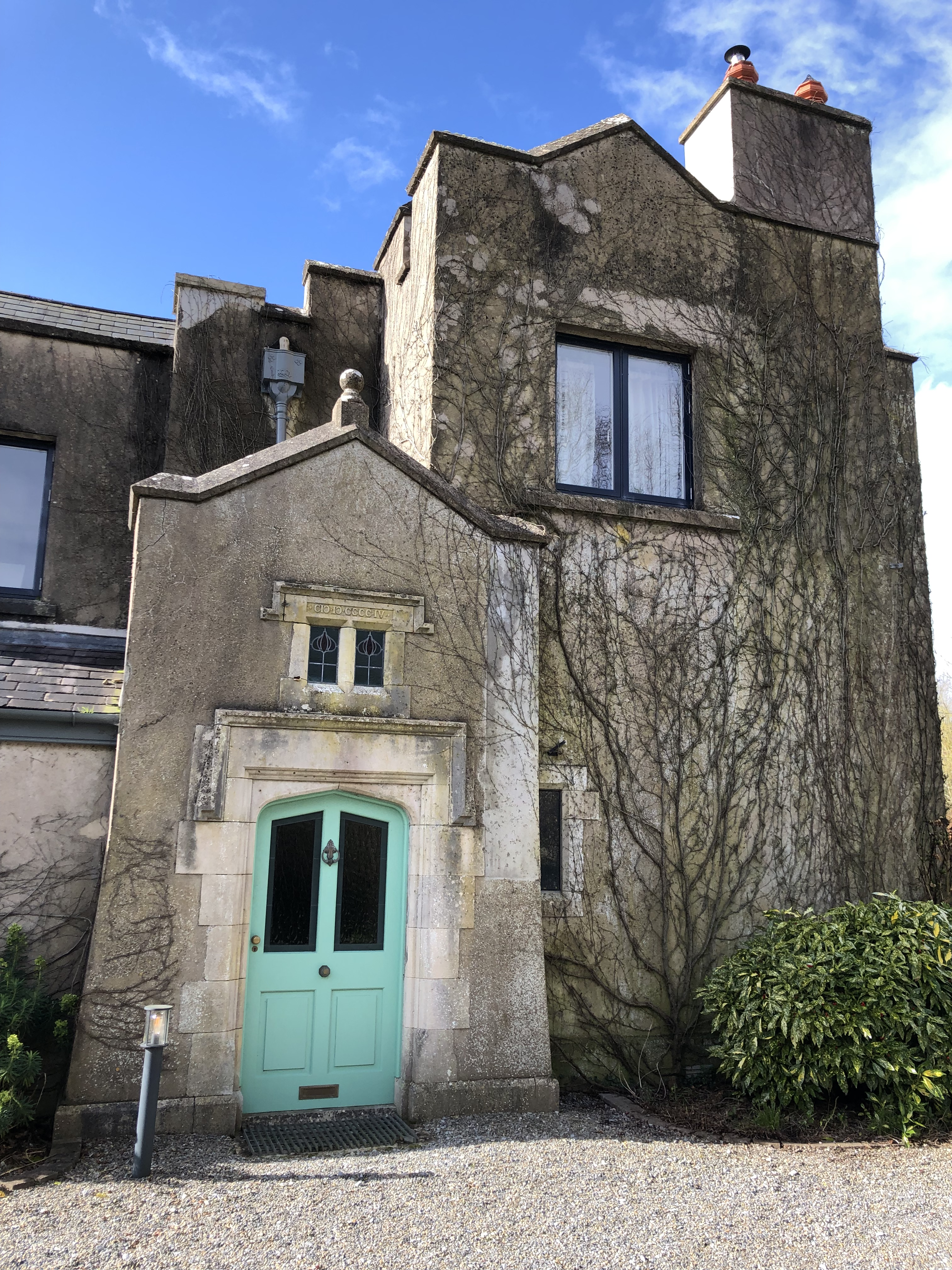
East Elevation, 1904 Extension

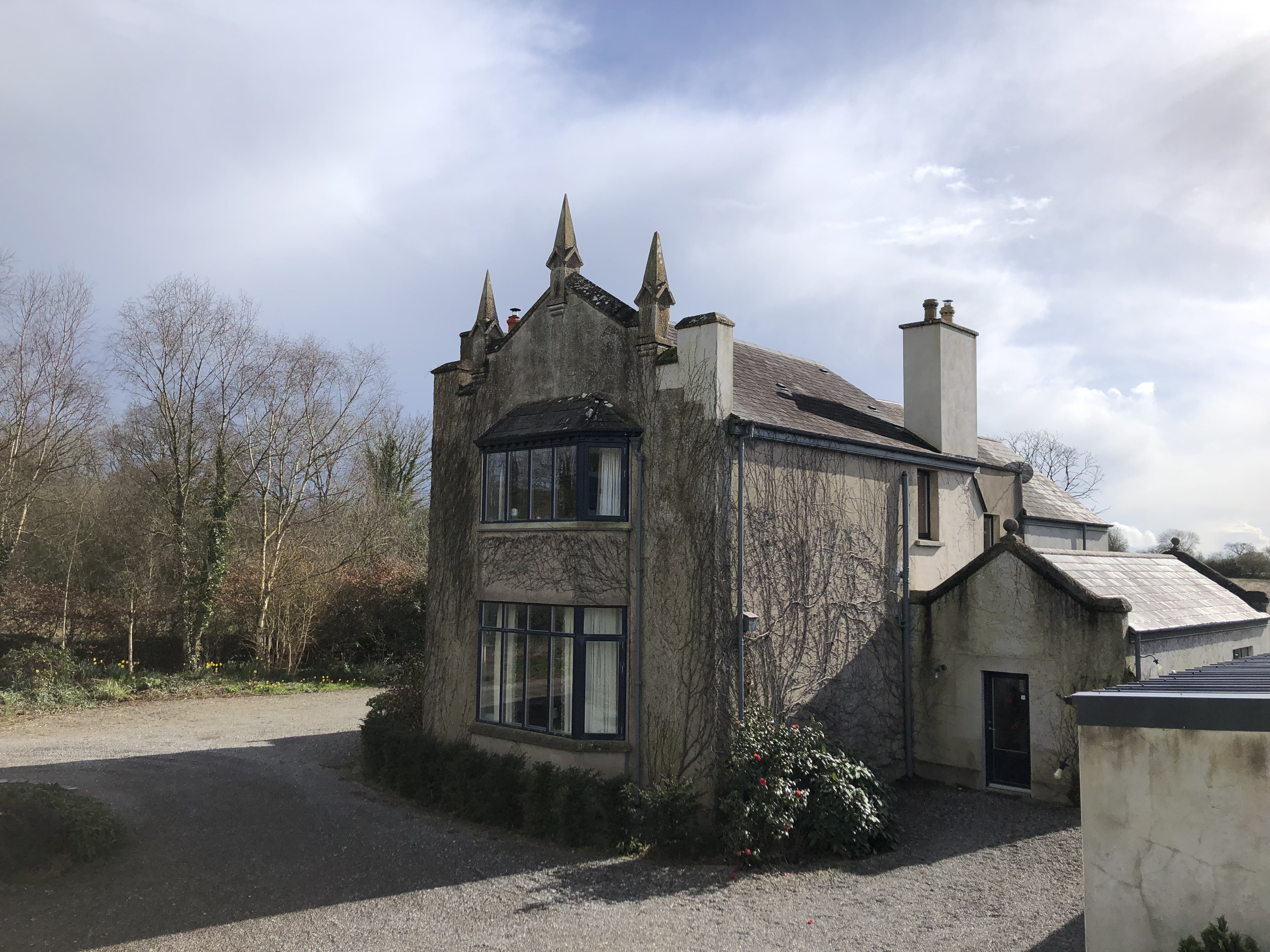
North Elevation, 1904 and later extensions
