= John Challoner =

Member of the Parliament of England

John Challoner MP (c. 1520–1581) was the first Secretary of State for Ireland, appointed by Queen Elizabeth I of England in 1560. He also sat at different times as a member of parliament in both the Parliament of England and the Parliament of Ireland. He should not be confused with his contemporary, Alderman John Challoner, Mayor of Dublin between 1556 and 1557, who died in 1565.

== Background ==
John Challoner was born around 1525 to Margaret Myddleton and Roger Challoner (c. 1490–1550). Roger Challoner was a London silk merchant, a Gentleman-Usher of the Privy Chamber to King Henry VIII, and a Teller of the Receipt of the Exchequer; it is recorded that he obtained the fishing rights of Galway City in 1538. Both John and his brother Francis Challoner settled in Dublin: their brother was the Elizabethan ambassador and statesman, Sir Thomas Chaloner.

John Challoner was admitted to Lincoln's Inn in 1541 and had begun a career by 1547 in the English-ruled outpost of Calais, on mainland France, as an auditor. He was a member of parliament in the Parliament of England in 1555 and it is thought he may have sat for the constituency of Calais. It is not clear at what stage Challoner resettled in Ireland, but his move may have been prompted by the final loss of Calais to French forces in 1558.

== Career in Ireland ==
The first reference to John Challoner in Irish records appears in 1551 when he was granted Lambay Island off the coast of Dublin. A condition of the lease was that he build a town for fishermen and a fortification on the island to defend against pirates. It was described in the 1830s as 'a curious old polygonal residence, with battlements and spike holes': it lay just to the south of the 19th-century Edwin Lutyens designed residence, but was completely demolished in 1837. Challoner appears to have spent the 1550s moving mostly between London and Calais before settling permanently in Dublin.

He was elected a member of parliament in Ireland for Dungarvan for the legislative session which convened on 12 January 1560. In 1560 Challoner was appointed as the English Crown's Secretary of State for Ireland by Queen Elizabeth I, an office which was later incorporated into the office of Chief Secretary for Ireland until its abolition in 1922. As Secretary, Challoner's role also included that of Keeper of the Royal Signet and membership of the Privy Council of Ireland. In 1563, he wrote to his English counterpart Lord Burghley asking to be relieved of the office in favour of his own brother Francis, as he wanted to concentrate on developing silver and gold mining on Lambay; but he stayed on until his death in 1581 when he was replaced by Sir Geoffrey Fenton. He had applied to become Irish Master of the Rolls in 1564, and despite making it to a final shortlist of four candidates, was beaten to the post by Henry Draycott.

Mining is known to have occupied a great deal of Challoner's attention. In addition to attempting to mine on Lambay Island, he also tried to expand his interests in mines in Castleknock, Clonmines, and Clontarf. It is not known how successful he was in these enterprises, but progress at Lambay was retarded by a lack of wood for smelting: attempts to ship wood from Cumberland to Lambay for that purpose fell through. In 1563, French pirates raided Lambay Island taking all they could of John Challoner's fortune, worth some £300. Ultimately, despite an annual salary of £50 as Secretary of State (including an additional 10s. a day while on the Queen's business), his heir found he had left debts of over £1000.

It has been argued that during Challoner's time as Secretary of State he did not become an independent and powerful Secretary, like Lord Burghley did in England, failing to fulfill the office's more political potential. Lord Deputy Sussex may have initially nominated Challoner to the office because of his experience as an auditor in Calais, as Sussex particularly burdened Challoner with the collection of the Cess tax, restricting Challoner's opportunity for influencing the Irish Privy Council. Likewise, during Sir Henry Sidney's tenure as Lord Deputy of Ireland, Sidney's own personal secretaries (especially Edward Waterhouse) assumed control over affairs of state which should have come under Challoner's remit as Secretary of State.

== Family ==
John Challoner's brother Francis was the father of Dr. Luke Challoner, who was one of the three founding fellows of Trinity College, Dublin in 1592, and also Pro-Chancellor of the college between 1612 and his death in 1613. Luke Challoner was the father-in-law of Archbishop James Ussher, Primate of All Ireland. He gave his name to the small graveyard in the grounds of Trinity College where he is buried, Challoner's Corner.

The suppression of monasteries in 1538 by King Henry VIII saw the closure of the 12th century Augustinian priory called All Hallows. The site of this monastery was chosen for a new college during the reign of Queen Elizabeth. John's nephew Luke Challoner was intricately involved from the inception of the idea of a university in Dublin.

Luke Challoner had attended Trinity College, Cambridge and christened the new educational institution in the capital city of the Kingdom of Ireland as Trinity College, Dublin. He led negotiations that secured the land and funding for the college. Upon the college admitting its first students in 1594, he served as Vice Chancellor and then as Vice Provost during the first Commencement ceremony of the University of Dublin in 1601. On his death in 1613 the tradition began with him of the burial of the Provost on campus.

Originally the Challoner grave was inside the College Chapel but reconstruction in the late 19th century saw the layout of the building change. The first College Chapel was replaced with a new building (the current chapel) in 1798. The graves of the college provosts now lie outside the north-eastern external wall of the chapel. Situated in the vicinity of the ATM of the Buttery, this small cemetery — the smallest in Ireland — is known as Challoner's Corner. As well as Luke Challoner, there are eight recorded burials there, including William Temple, Thomas Seele, George Browne, Francis Andrews, Richard Baldwin, FSL Lyons, and William Arthur Watts.

== Alderman John Challoner, Mayor of Dublin ==
John Challoner, Secretary of State, is often confused with his contemporary namesake who was also prominent in Dublin politics, but died sixteen years earlier. Alderman John Challoner was the Sheriff of Dublin City in 1545, and first appears in the records of Dublin Corporation as a member from 1547. He became Mayor of Dublin in September 1556 and died in 1565.

There is a story told of John Challoner's defence of the city while Mayor, however the episode happened some months before his election and may have indeed contributed, if true, to his election later that year. In May 1556 the native Gaelic Kavanagh clan of Carlow raided Dublin, the seat of English rule in Ireland. Challoner armed a civic militia in defence of Dublin with "several pieces of ordnance and a hundred and fifty fire arms" which he had imported at his own expense from Spain. He was reputedly offered a knighthood by the Lord Deputy, the Earl of Sussex in recognition, but turned it down, saying: "No my Lord, it will be more to my credit and my posterity's to have it said that John Challoner served the Queen upon occasion, than to say that Sir John Challoner did it." The Kavanaghs and their supporters were driven out of Dublin and captured at Powerscourt Castle, after which they were brought back to Dublin and 74 were executed.

Parliament of England
| Preceded by Oliver Loveband; Hugh Counsell | Member of Parliament, possibly for Calais; 1555 | Constituency abolished |
Parliament of Ireland
| Unknown | Member of Parliament for Dungarvan; 1559 | Unknown |
Political offices
| New creation | Secretary of State for Ireland; 1560–1581 | Succeeded by Geoffrey Fenton |
