= Michael Ward (bishop) =

English Anglican bishop and academic

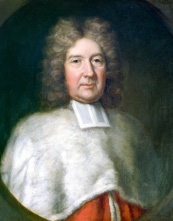
- Provost Michael Ward, by Hugh Howard

12th Provost of Trinity College Dublin
- In office 30 July 1675 – 1 August 1678
- Preceded by: Thomas Seele
- Succeeded by: Narcissus Marsh

Personal details
- Born: 1643 Newport, Shropshire, England
- Died: 1681 (aged 37–38) Oxford, England
- Education: Trinity College Dublin

'Michael Ward (1643-1681) was an English 17th-century Anglican bishop and academic who served as the 12th Provost of Trinity College Dublin from 1675 to 1678.

Ward was the son of Richard Ward. He was born in Newport, Shropshire, England, and he was educated at Trinity College Dublin. Ward was Regius Professor of Divinity at Trinity College Dublin from 1670 to 1678 and its Provost from 1674 to 1678; Dean of Lismore from 1670 to 1678; Archdeacon of Armagh from 1674 to 1678; Bishop of Ossory from 1678 to 1680; and Derry from 1680; until his death on 3 October 1681. His early death at 38 cut short a career which saw his meteoric rise to high office, fuelled by his great ambition.

His nephew, also Michael Ward, was an Irish politician and judge, and father of the first Viscount Bangor.

== Notes ==
Academic offices
Preceded by Richard Lingard	Regius Professor of Divinity, Trinity College Dublin; 1670–1678	Succeeded by William Palliser
Preceded by Thomas Seele	Provost of Trinity College Dublin; 1674–1678	Succeeded by Narcissus Marsh
Church of Ireland titles
Preceded by Richard Lingard	Dean of Lismore; 1670–1678	Succeeded by Edward Jones
Preceded by William Smith	Archdeacon of Armagh; 1674–1678	Succeeded by Thomas Otway
Preceded by Benjamin Parry	Bishop of Ossory; 1678–1680	Succeeded by Thomas Otway
Preceded by Robert Mossom	Bishop of Derry; 1680–1681	Succeeded by Ezekiel Hopkins
