= Chancellor of the University of Dublin =

Titular head of the University of Dublin (Trinity College Dublin)

- Incumbent; Mary McAleese since 6 December 2019; 6 years ago
- Appointer: Elected by the senate of the university
- First holder: The 1st Baron Burghley
- Deputy: Pro-Chancellors
- Website: Chancellor of the University of Dublin

== Introduction ==
The Chancellor of the University of Dublin is the titular head of the University of Dublin, generally referred to by its sole college, Trinity College Dublin, founded in 1592. The current Chancellor is Mary McAleese, former president of Ireland.

== Chancellors of the University of Dublin ==
- 1592–1598: The 1st Baron Burghley
- 1598–1601: The 2nd Earl of Essex
- 1601–1612: The 1st Earl of Salisbury (known as Viscount Cranborne until 1605)
- 1612–1633: George Abbot, Archbishop of Canterbury
- 1633–1645: William Laud, Archbishop of Canterbury
- 1645–1653: The 1st Marquess of Ormonde (created the 1st Duke of Ormonde in 1661)
- 1653–1660: Henry Cromwell
- 1660–1688: The 1st Duke of Ormonde (restored)
- 1688–1715: The 2nd Duke of Ormonde
- 1715–1727: George, Prince of Wales
- 1727–1728: Vacant
- 1728–1751: Frederick, Prince of Wales
- 1751–1765: The Duke of Cumberland
- 1765–1771: The 4th Duke of Bedford
- 1771–1805: The Duke of Gloucester and Edinburgh
- 1805–1851: The Duke of Cumberland and Teviotdale (succeeded as King Ernest Augustus of Hanover in June 1837)
- 1851–1862: Lord John Beresford, Archbishop of Armagh
- 1862–1867: The 3rd Earl of Rosse, President of the Royal Society (UK)
- 1867–1885: The 1st Baron Cairns (created The 1st Earl Cairns in 1878), Lord High Chancellor of Great Britain, (1868 and 1874–1880)
- 1885–1908: The 4th Earl of Rosse, vice-president of the Royal Society in 1881 and 1887. President of the Royal Irish Academy from 1896
- 1908–1927: The 1st Viscount Iveagh (created The 1st Earl of Iveagh in 1919)
- 1927–1963: Rupert Guinness, 2nd Earl of Iveagh
- 1963–1982: Frederick Boland
- 1982–1984: Professor William Bedell Stanford
- 1985–1998: Francis O'Reilly
- 1998–2019: Professor Mary Robinson
- 2019–present: Professor Mary McAleese

== Vice-Chancellors and Pro-Chancellors of the University of Dublin ==
The Chancellor of the University of Dublin is supported by a number of Pro-Chancellors who may act in his/her place. The appointment was formerly known as the Vice-Chancellor; this post was held by one individual who acted as deputy to the Chancellor. In 1964, the Vice-Chancellor was replaced by a group of Pro-Chancellors (up to a maximum of six): the seniority of the Pro-Chancellors is determined by date of election.

=== Vice-Chancellors ===
- 1: Henry Alvey (1609–1612) (had been Provost, 1601–1609)
- 2: The Revd Luke Challoner (1612–1613) (had been Regius Professor of Divinity)
- 3: Charles Dunn/Doyne/Ó Duinn JCD (1614–1615) "distinguished legist ... son of the Chief of Hy Regan" MP for Dublin University, 1613
- 4: The Most Revd James Ussher (1615–1646), Archbishop of Armagh, 1625–1656
- 5: The Right Revd Henry Jones (1646–1660), Bishop of Clogher
- 6: The Right Revd Jeremy Taylor (1660–1667), Bishop of Down and Connor
- 7: The Most Revd James Margetson (1667–1678), Archbishop of Armagh
- 8: The Right Revd Michael Ward (1678–1681), Bishop of Ossory (1678–1680), Bishop of Derry, (1680–1681)
- 9: The Most Revd Anthony Dopping (1682–1697), Bishop of Meath
- 10: The Very Revd Edward Smith or Smyth (1697–1698), Dean of St Patrick's Cathedral, Dublin
- 11: The Most Revd Richard Tenison (1698–1702), Bishop of Meath
- 12: The Right Revd St George Ashe (1702–1713), Bishop of Clogher
- 13: The Most Revd John Vesey (1713–1714), Archbishop of Tuam
- 14: The Right Revd Thomas Smyth (1714–1721), Bishop of Limerick
- 15: The Right Revd John Sterne (1721–1743), Bishop of Clogher
- 19. Richard Robinson, 1st Baron Rokeby (1765–1791), Archbishop of Armagh
- 20. John FitzGibbon, 1st Earl of Clare (1791–1802), Lord Chancellor of Ireland, (1791–1802)
- 21. Arthur Wolfe, 1st Viscount Kilwarden (1802–1803), Lord Chief Justice of the King's Bench in Ireland (1798–1803)
- 22. John Freeman-Mitford, 1st Baron Redesdale (1803–1806), Lord Chancellor of Ireland, (1802–1806)
- 23. William Downes (1806–1816), Lord Chief Justice of the King's Bench in Ireland, (1803–1822)
- 24. Thomas Manners-Sutton, 1st Baron Manners (1816–1829), Lord Chancellor of Ireland, (1807–1827)
- 25. The Most Revd Lord John George De La Poer Beresford (1829–1851), Archbishop of Armagh
- 26. Francis Blackburne (1852–1867), Lord Chancellor of Ireland, (1852 and 1866–67)
- 27. Sir Joseph Napier (1867–1880), MP for Dublin University, (1848–1858), Lord Chancellor of Ireland, (1858–1859)
- 28. John Thomas Ball (1880–1895), MP for Dublin University, (1868–1875), Lord Chancellor of Ireland, (1875–1880)
- 29. Dodgson Hamilton Madden (1895–1919), MP for Dublin University, (1887–1892)
- 30: John Henry Bernard (1919-1919), Archbishop of Dublin (1915–1919), Provost (1919–1927)
- 31: Sir James Henry Mussen Campbell, first Lord Glenavy (1919–1931), Lord Chancellor of Ireland, (1918–1921)
- 32: Sir Thomas Francis Molony (1931–1949), Lord Chief Justice of Ireland, (1918–1924)
- 33: Michael Parsons, 6th Earl of Rosse (1949–1979); Vice-Chancellor to 1964

=== Pro-Chancellors ===
- 33: Michael Parsons, 6th Earl of Rosse (1949–1979); Pro-Chancellor from 1964
- 34: Bryan Guinness, 2nd Baron Moyne (1965–1977)
- 35: Professor George Alexander Duncan (1965–1972)
- 45: Anthony Joseph Francis O'Reilly (1994–2011)
- 46: Susan Jane Gageby Denham (1995–2010)
- 47: Professor Eda Sagarra (1999–2008)
- 48: Patrick James Anthony Molloy (2000–2013)
- 49: Professor Dermot F. McAleese (2005–2017)
- 50: Professor Vincent John Scattergood (2008–2015)
- 51: Professor Thomas David Spearman (2009–2012)
- 52: Petros Serghiou Florides (2010–2012)
- 53: Mary Henry (2012–2015)
- 54: Edward McParland (2013–2018)
- 55: Dame Jocelyn Bell Burnell (2013–2018)
- 56: Sir Donnell Deeny (2014–2025)
- 57: Professor David McConnell (2016–2019)
- 58: Professor Jane Grimson (2016–2025)
- 59: Sean Barrett (2018–2019)
- 60: Professor Sheila Greene (2018–2022)
- 61: Stanley Swee Han Quek (2018–2024)
- 63: Professor Ignatius Thomas McGovern (2020–2024)

Current

- 62: Professor Shane Ann Patricia Allwright (2020–present)
- 64: Frank Clarke (2022–present)
- 65: Rachel Hussey (2024–present)
- 66: Professor Jürgen Barkhoff (2024–present)
- 67: Mark Orr (2025-present)
- 68: Hugh Patrick MacNeill (2025-present)
- 69: Professor Gerard McHugh (2025-present)
