= Thomas Noel Mitchell =

Irish academic

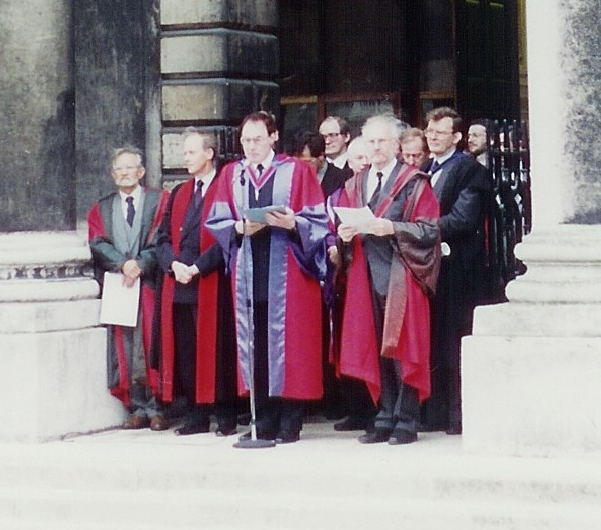
- Provost Tom Mitchel announcing the new Fellows and Scholars on Trinity Monday 1994 in Trinity College Dublin.

42nd Provost of Trinity College Dublin
- In office 1 August 1991 – 1 August 2001
- Preceded by: William Arthur Watts
- Succeeded by: John Hegarty

Personal details
- Born: Thomas Noel Mitchell; 7 December 1939 (age 85); Castlebar, County Mayo, Ireland
- Education: St Nathy's College
- Alma mater: University of Galway (B.A., M.A.); Cornell University (Ph.D.); Trinity College, Dublin (Litt.D.)

Thomas Noel Mitchell (born 7 December 1939) is an Irish academic who served as the 42nd Provost of Trinity College Dublin from 1991 to 2001.

== Biography ==
Mitchell was born in Castlebar, County Mayo on 7 December 1939, to Patrick Mitchell and Margaret Mitchell. He was educated at St Nathy's College in Ballaghaderreen. He graduated with first-class honours with a B.A. and M.A. in Latin and Greek from University College Galway. He earned a doctorate from Cornell University and a Litt.D. from Trinity College Dublin. He started his academic career as instructor at Cornell University from 1965 to 1966. He joined the faculty of Swarthmore College in 1966, first as assistant professor (1966-1973), then associate professor (1973-1978), and full professor (1978-1979). He returned to the Ireland as Professor of Latin at Trinity College Dublin in 1979. His work on Cicero and Roman Republicanism has won him wide acclaim and has been described as a monument in the field.

He served as director of Hibernia College in Dublin and was the former chairman of the boards of St. James’s Hospital and the Ireland National Children's Trust. He was on the Irish Council for Science, Engineering and Technology. He also served as director of the Trinity Foundation. In 1991, he was the first Catholic to be elected and appointed as Provost of Trinity College Dublin, since Micheál Ó Mordha (Michael Moore) was provost from 1689-1690.

He is a member of the Royal Irish Academy and the American Philosophical Society, and is a Fellow of Oriel College, Oxford and St. John's College, Cambridge. He holds honorary doctorates from numerous universities, including the Queen's University, Belfast, National University of Ireland, Swarthmore College, Charles University in Prague, the State University of New York, and Victoria University, Melbourne.

Academic offices
Preceded by William Arthur Watts	Provost of Trinity College Dublin; 1991–2001	Succeeded by John Hegarty
