= Neill Malloy =

17th-century Irish Anglican priest

Neill Molloy was an Anglican priest in Ireland in the seventeenth century.

Molloy was born in King's County, Ireland (now Offaly) and educated at Trinity College, Dublin. He was ordained in 1617 and became the incumbent at Fercall. He was Precentor of Kildare Cathedral from 1633 to 1639; and Archdeacon of Clonmacnoise from 1638 to 1639.
