= John Anckers =

John Anckers was an Anglican priest in Ireland in the seventeenth century.

Anckers was educated at Trinity College, Dublin. After serving as a curate at Drumrany, he held incumbencies at Ballyloghloe and Athlone. He was appointed Archdeacon of Clonmacnoise in 1620.
