= Number of Westminster MPs =

MPs by party

Over the history of the House of Commons, the number of Members of Parliament (MPs) has varied for assorted reasons, with increases in recent years due to increases in the population of the United Kingdom. There are currently 650 constituencies, each sending one MP to the House of Commons, corresponding to approximately one for every 92,000 people, or one for every 68,000 parliamentary electors.

While the Conservative – Liberal Democrat coalition governing after the 2010 general election had initially planned to reduce the number of MPs and constituencies to 600 during its term of office, Parliament voted in January 2013 to delay the boundary review this change would require. Section 6 of the Electoral Registration and Administration Act 2013 required that the next review report come by October 2018; that was done, but the delays continued. The overall measure was not implemented and later abrogated with the Parliamentary Constituencies Act 2020, from which the redrawn boundaries will be based and implemented ahead of the 2024 United Kingdom general election. The new boundary reviews were submitted on 28 June 2023.

== History ==
In the 16th century there were around 310 members of parliament, including representation at various points from Calais and Wales.

In 1654 the First Protectorate Parliament included elected representation from Scotland and Ireland. After the Third Protectorate Parliament in 1659 the Scottish and Irish members disappeared from Westminster until the unions of 1707 and 1801 respectively.

In 1654 England and Wales saw its first systematic redistribution of parliamentary seats ever. However, in 1659 the representation of England and Wales reverted to the pre-Civil War pattern. When the Rump Parliament was recalled, later the same year, and the full Long Parliament was reinstated the following year its composition was exactly the same as before the Protectorate.

Only three new English constituencies, with a total of six seats, were enfranchised between the restoration of King Charles II in 1660 and the Reform Act 1832. As many of the constituencies were rotten boroughs, which had either decayed into insignificance centuries ago or had never been important settlements, whereas some major towns only participated in elections as part of the historical county they were situated in, the state of representation was very imperfect. By the Glorious Revolution of 1688 there were 513 MPs, until the Act of Union 1707 added 45 MPs for Scotland. (A total of 48 Scottish constituencies were able to return members, but six small counties were arranged in an alternating scheme whereby only three would return a member at each election, giving a total of 45 MPs). These 558 were again increased to 658 by the Act of Union 1800, with the addition of MPs for Ireland.

Over the next 85 years the number of seats varied only slightly, as constituencies were disenfranchised for corruption and the seats were re-allocated some time later (see the lists below for details). The major redistributions of constituencies following the Reform Act 1832 and Reform Act 1867 both created a new House (elected in 1832 and 1868 respectively) with exactly 658 seats. The number of MPs had dropped to 648 by the dissolution before the general election of 1885.

With the Redistribution of Seats Act 1885, introduced in the wake of the Reform Act 1884, the size of the House was increased to 670 and remained unchanged until the Representation of the People Act at the end of the First World War.

The period between 1918 and 1922 saw the most MPs in the history of Parliament with 707 seats.

From 1922 the number of seats has fluctuated between 615 and 659. Unlike the position in many countries, such as the United States and Australia, seats are not allocated to different parts of the United Kingdom by a strict mathematical formula. The total number of seats result from the decisions of the four national Boundary Commissions, each applying the rules from time to time provided for by Parliament.

Up to the fifth general review of parliamentary boundaries, the usual effect of the interaction of the rules applied by the four national boundary commissions was to over-represent the non-English parts of the United Kingdom compared to England. The number of seats in each redistribution also tended to rise (although Northern Ireland was under represented between 1922 and 1983 as for most of that time it had a devolved government and from the 2005 redistribution Scotland used the same quota of average number of electors per constituency as England as it now has devolved institutions).

The Parliamentary Voting System and Constituencies Act 2011, amended the rules. For the first time the total number of members of parliament was to be fixed (at 600) and a mathematical formula was prescribed for apportioning seats between the four parts of the United Kingdom. As a result of the new legislation, the sixth general review of parliamentary boundaries commenced. The four national boundary commissions agreed on the apportionment of seats. They had a statutory duty to produce a final report on the review by 1 October 2018, but it was not submitted for approval and never implemented at all in 2019, with Parliament and the commissions keeping the 650 seats and the boundaries as drawn before 2010. For the next election, scheduled for 2024, the newly redrawn constituency boundaries and recommendations, whose process began in January 2021, are expected to be reported no later than June 2023.

=== Number of MPs since 1654 ===
The numbering of Parliaments in the table below related to the Protectorate Parliaments (1654–59), the Parliaments of Great Britain (1707–1800) and the Parliaments of the United Kingdom (from 1801).

Years	Parliaments	MPs	Notes
1654–59	1st–2nd	460	Thirty members each from Scotland and Ireland.
1659	3rd	567	England and Wales reverted to pre-1654 distribution of seats.
1659–73		507	Scotland and Ireland no longer represented at Westminster.
1673–75		509	Enfranchisement of Newark.
1675–78		511	Enfranchisement of County Durham.
1678–1707		513	Enfranchisement of the City of Durham.
1707–1800	1st–18th	558	Union of Scotland with England and Wales.
1801–21	1st–7th	658	Union of Ireland with Great Britain. Numbering restarted.
1821–26	7th	656	Disenfranchisement of Grampound. (Note: Change came into effect during a Parliament.)
1826–44	8th–14th	658	Two seats re-allocated as additional seats to Yorkshire.
1844–52	14th–15th	656	Disenfranchisement of Sudbury.
1852–61	15th–18th	654	Disenfranchisement of St Albans.
1861–65	18th	656	Two seats re-allocated to enfranchise Birkenhead and as an additional seat to South Lancashire.
1865–70	19th–20th	658	West Riding of Yorkshire divided into two constituencies.
1870–85	20th–22nd	652	Four constituencies disenfranchised for corruption.
1885	22nd	648	Two constituencies disenfranchised for corruption.
1885–1918	23rd–30th	670	
1918–22	31st	707	Largest Parliament ever assembled.
1922–45	32nd–37th	615	Irish Free State left Union, Northern Ireland constituencies reduced.
1945–50	38th	640	Several large constituencies divided.
1950–55	39th–40th	625	University and multi-member constituencies abolished.
1955–74	41st–45th	630	
1974–83	46th–48th	635	
1983–92	49th–50th	650	
1992–97	51st	651	Split of Milton Keynes.
1997–2005	52nd–53rd	659	
2005–10	54th	646	Scottish over-representation reduced after creation of Scottish Parliament.
2010–present	55th-58th	650	A net gain of four seats in England.

== List of constituencies disenfranchised for corruption and re-allocated seats 1821–85 ==
The normal number of members of parliament in this period was 658. Changes took effect on the dissolution of the previous Parliament, unless otherwise indicated.

Year	Parliament	Change	Total MPs	Notes
1821	7th (Note: This change took effect during the Parliament.)	−2	656	Grampound disenfranchised and represented as part of Cornwall.
1826	8th	+2	658	Yorkshire received additional seats (4 instead of 2).
1844	14th	−2	656	Sudbury disenfranchised and represented as part of West Suffolk.
1852	15th	−2	654	St Albans disenfranchised and represented as part of Hertfordshire.
1861	18th	+1	655	Birkenhead was enfranchised.
1861	18th	+1	656	South Lancashire received an additional seat (3 instead of 2).
1865	19th	+2	658	West Riding of Yorkshire, a 2-member seat, was split into 2 two member divisions.
1868	20th (Note: This change took effect at the same time as the redistribution provided for by the Reform Act 1867, so the total membership of the 20th Parliament remained unchanged from the 658 at the dissolution of the 19th Parliament.)	−2	658	Great Yarmouth disenfranchised and represented as part of North Norfolk and East Suffolk.
1868	20th	−2	658	Lancaster disenfranchised and represented as part of North Lancashire.
1868	20th	−1	658	Reigate disenfranchised and represented as part of Mid Surrey.
1868	20th	−2	658	Totnes disenfranchised and represented as part of South Devon.
1870	20th	−2	656	Beverley disenfranchised and represented as part of East Riding of Yorkshire.
1870	20th	−2	654	Bridgwater disenfranchised and represented as part of West Somerset.
1870	20th	−1	653	Cashel disenfranchised and represented as part of County Tipperary.
1870	20th	−1	652	Sligo disenfranchised and represented as part of County Sligo.
1885	22nd (Note: This change took effect during the Parliament. The Macclesfield borough constituency which was disenfranchised on 25 June 1885, should not be confused with the Macclesfield county constituency which was created under the redistribution that took effect at the 1885 United Kingdom general election and held its first election in November or December 1885.)	−2	650	Macclesfield disenfranchised and represented as part of East Cheshire.
1885	22nd	−2	648	Sandwich disenfranchised and represented as part of East Kent.

== Number of MPs by country ==
Under the Commonwealth of England, Scotland and Ireland, the Protectorate regime was established by the Instrument of Government which included a redistribution of parliamentary seats in England and Wales. It also authorised the Lord Protector and Council of State to provide for the parliamentary representation of Scotland and Ireland. This arrangement only lasted for a few years and the three components of the Commonwealth reverted to having individual parliaments.

The total number of MPs representing constituencies in different parts of the United Kingdom has been varied by Act of Parliament several times since the Acts of Union 1707. In the tables below the occasions on which the number has been changed, and the number of MPs following the change is given in each case. The dates given are those when the change took effect. More details of minor changes in the 1821–85 period are set out in the section above.

Monmouthshire is treated as part of Wales throughout this section, although it was sometimes considered to be an English county before the twentieth century. The number of members of parliament representing the county (including borough constituencies within it) was (1654–1885) three, (1885–1918) four and (1918–83) six.

Country	1654	1659 (Note: Third Protectorate Parliament)	1659 (Note: Rump Parliament/Long Parliament restored)	1673	1675	1678	1707	1801	1821	1826	1832	1844	1852	1861	1865	1868	1870	1885 (Note: Changes in June 1885)	1885 (Note: Changes at the 1885 United Kingdom general election, in November–December 1885)	1918
England	372	480	480	482	484	486	486	486	484	486	468	466	464	466	468	460	456	452	461	492
Wales	28	27	27	27	27	27	27	27	27	27	32	32	32	32	32	33	33	33	34	36
Scotland	30	30	0	0	0	0	45	45	45	45	53	53	53	53	53	60	60	60	72	74
Ireland	30	30	0	0	0	0	0	100	100	100	105	105	105	105	105	105	103	103	103	105
Total	460	567	507	509	511	513	558	658	656	658	658	656	654	656	658	658	652	648	670	707

Country	1922	1945	1950	1955	1974	1983	1992	1997	2005	2010	2015	2017	2019	2024
England	492	517	506	511	516	523	524	529	529	533	533	533	533	543
Wales	36	36	36	36	36	38	38	40	40	40	40	40	40	32
Scotland	74	74	71	71	71	72	72	72	59	59	59	59	59	57
Northern Ireland	13	13	12	12	12	17	17	18	18	18	18	18	18	18
Total	615	640	625	630	635	650	651	659	646	650	650	650	650	650

Notes

A list of the number of MPs from Scotland, as provided for in the year of the legislation specified (but not necessarily the year when the redistribution took effect).

- 1654: 30
- 1659: 0
- 1707: 45
- 1832: 53
- 1867: 60
- 1885: 72
- 1918: 74
- 1948: 71
- 1983: 72
- 2003: 59
- Next: 57

In 2003, following the creation of the Scottish Parliament, the Boundary Commission for Scotland met to recommend a decrease in the number of Scottish MPs. This change came into effect following the May 2005 general election.

== Recent boundary changes ==
=== 2024 ===
See 2023 Periodic Review of Westminster constituencies.

=== 2010 ===
See Boundary changes for the 2010 United Kingdom general election.

=== 2005 ===
The House of Commons was reduced from 659 to 646, following a boundary review in Scotland that reduced the number of Scottish seats by 13.

=== 1997 ===
The House of Commons was increased from 651 to 659 following a major boundary review.

=== 1992 ===
The House of Commons was increased from 650 to 651, by splitting Milton Keynes into two constituencies after a rare interim boundary review due to the growing size of the town. All other seats remained unchanged.

=== 1983 ===
The House of Commons was increased from 635 to 650.

Wales gained 2 seats. Scotland gained 1 seat. Northern Ireland gained 5 seats.

Only 66 constituencies remained unchanged, in the greatest boundary re-organisation since the Great Reform Act.

=== 1955 ===
The House of Commons was increased from 625 to 630 seats.

The five net additional seats were all in England. Eleven new constituencies were created, while six were abolished. Of the new constituencies two were in Essex, with one in each of Middlesex, Surrey, Kent, East Sussex, Hertfordshire, Cheshire, Hampshire, Staffordshire and Warwickshire.

London, Reading, Leeds, Sheffield, Blackburn and Manchester each lost a seat.

In total, 152 constituencies underwent major alterations, with 30 more having minor changes. 324 seats remained unchanged. The average constituency electorate was 55,670.

=== 1950 ===
The House of Commons was reduced from 640 to 625 seats.

The 12 University seats were abolished.

The 12 double-member seats were abolished, being split into separate constituencies. The Cities of London and Westminster, previously having two seats each, were merged into one seat.

Wales gained a seat.

London lost 19 seats, Liverpool 2, Manchester 1, while Edinburgh gained 2 seats, and Bristol, Coventry, Leeds, and Leicester gained 1 each.

Boundary changes were extensive, with only 80 seats remaining unchanged.

== See also ==
- Number of Parliamentarians in the Fifth French Republic
