= Narcissus Marsh =

English clergyman (1638–1713)

The Most Reverend and Right Honourable Narcissus Marsh PC (Ire), D.D.
- Archbishop of Armagh; Primate of All Ireland
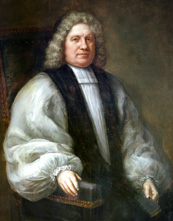
- Church: Church of Ireland
- Archdiocese: Armagh
- Appointed: 26 January 1703
- In office: 1703–1713
- Predecessor: Michael Boyle
- Successor: Thomas Lindsay
- Previous posts: Bishop of Ferns and Leighlin (1683-1691); Archbishop of Cashel (1691-1694); Archbishop of Dublin (1694-1703)

Orders
- Ordination: 1662
- Consecration: 6 May 1683 by Francis Marsh

Personal details
- Born: 20 December 1638 Hannington, Wiltshire, England
- Died: 2 November 1713 (aged 74) Dublin, Ireland
- Buried: St Patrick's Cathedral, Dublin
- Denomination: Anglican
- Education: Magdalen Hall, Oxford

Narcissus Marsh

13th Provost of Trinity College Dublin
- In office 1 August 1679 – 30 July 1683
- Preceded by: Michael Ward
- Succeeded by: Robert Huntington

Narcissus Marsh (20 December 1638 – 2 November 1713) was an English clergyman who was successively Church of Ireland Bishop of Ferns and Leighlin, Archbishop of Cashel, Archbishop of Dublin and Archbishop of Armagh. He also served as the 13th Provost of Trinity College Dublin from 1679 to 1683.

Marsh was born at Hannington, Wiltshire and educated at Magdalen Hall, Oxford. In 1658, he became a fellow of Exeter College, Oxford. In 1662, he was ordained and presented to the living of Swindon, which he resigned from in the following year.

After acting as chaplain to Seth Ward, Bishop of Exeter and then Bishop of Salisbury, and Lord Chancellor Clarendon, he was elected principal of St Alban Hall, Oxford, in 1673. In 1679, he was appointed Provost of Trinity College Dublin, where he did much to encourage the study of the Irish language. He helped to found the Dublin Philosophical Society and contributed to it a paper entitled Introductory Essay to the Doctrine of Sounds (printed in Philosophical Transactions, No. 156, Oxford, 1684). As a scientist, he coined the word "microphone" from the Greek roots.

In 1683, he was consecrated Bishop of Ferns and Leighlin. Still, after the accession of James II, he was compelled by the turbulent soldiery to flee to England (1689), when he became Vicar of Gresford, Flintshire, and Canon of St. Asaph. Returning to Ireland in 1691 after the Battle of the Boyne, he was made Archbishop of Cashel, and three years later, he became Archbishop of Dublin and resided at St. Sepulchre's Palace. He founded Marsh's Library in Dublin. Many oriental manuscripts belonging to him are now in the Bodleian Library in Oxford. He became Archbishop of Armagh in 1703. Between 1699 and 1711, he was a Lord Justice of Ireland six times. He died on 2 November 1713.

His funeral oration was pronounced by his successor at Dublin, Archbishop King. A more acerbic account of his character was provided three years prior by Jonathan Swift in his short essay on the "Character of Primate Marsh," which concludes: "No man will be either glad or sorry at his death, except his successor."

Academic offices
Preceded by Michael Ward	Provost of Trinity College Dublin; 1679–1683	Succeeded by Robert Huntington
Church of Ireland titles
Preceded by Richard Boyle	Bishop of Ferns and Leighlin; 1683–1691	Succeeded by Bartholomew Vigors
Preceded by Thomas Price	Archbishop of Cashel; 1691–1694	Succeeded by William Palliser
Preceded by Francis Marsh	Archbishop of Dublin; 1694–1703	Succeeded by William King
Preceded by Michael Boyle	Archbishop of Armagh; 1703–1713	Succeeded by Thomas Lindsay
