= Ernest Alton =

Irish academic and politician (1873–1952)

38th Provost of Trinity College Dublin
- In office 1 August 1942 – 1 August 1952
- Preceded by: William Thrift
- Succeeded by: Albert Joseph McConnell

Senator
- In office 27 April 1938 – 8 September 1943
- Constituency: Dublin University

Teachta Dála
- In office May 1921 – July 1937
- Constituency: Dublin University

Personal details
- Born: 21 September 1873 Mullingar, County Westmeath, Ireland
- Died: 18 February 1952 (aged 78) Dublin, Ireland
- Spouse: Ethel Hughes-Hunter (m. 1915)
- Children: 3
- Relatives: Bryan Alton (nephew)
- Education: Trinity College Dublin

Military service
- Allegiance: United Kingdom
- Branch/service: University Officers' Training Corps
- Rank: Captain
- Unit: Dublin UOTC
- Conflicts: Easter Rising
- Awards: Military Cross

Ernest Henry Alton (21 September 1873 – 18 February 1952) was an Irish academic and politician who served as the 38th Provost of Trinity College Dublin from 1942 to 1952. He also served as a Teachta Dála (TD) from 1921 to 1937 and a Senator from 1938 to 1943, representing the Dublin University constituency respectively in each house.

Born near Mullingar, County Westmeath, in 1873, Alton attended The High School in Dublin. He graduated from Trinity College Dublin in 1896 with honours in classics and philosophy, having been elected a Scholar of the college in 1894. He won the Berkeley medal (in Greek) and the Wray prize (in philosophy) and was awarded a studentship (postgraduate scholarship) on his final results. He was commissioned into Trinity College's Dublin University Officers' Training Corps in 1911, and led the cadets to defend the college during the 1916 Easter Rising from the Irish Volunteers, for which he was awarded the Military Cross. He was elected to the Royal Irish Academy in 1912, and served as its vice-president from 1942 to 1944, and from 1946 to 1947.

He was elected to the House of Commons of Southern Ireland at the 1921 elections, representing the Dublin University constituency as an Independent Unionist, he did not participate in the Second Dáil. He was re-elected for the same constituency at the 1922 general election and became a member of the 3rd Dáil. He was re-elected at the next five general elections until the Dublin University Dáil Éireann constituency was abolished in 1937. He served as a member of the 2nd Seanad and the 3rd Seanad representing the Seanad Éireann Dublin University constituency until 1943 when he retired from politics.

He was a professor of Latin at Trinity College Dublin from 1921 to 1942 and was Provost from 1942 until he died in 1952. During his time as provost, the college made the first successful application for state funding. He married Ethel Hughes-Hunter in 1915, and they had 2 sons and a daughter.

His nephew Bryan Alton was a member of Seanad Éireann from 1965 to 1973.

Academic offices
Preceded by William Thrift	Provost of Trinity College Dublin; 1942–1952	Succeeded by Albert Joseph McConnell

Dáil	Election	Deputy (Party)	Deputy (Party)	Deputy (Party)	Deputy (Party)
1st	1918	Arthur Samuels (U)	Robert Woods (Ind U)	2 seats under 1918 Act	
1st	1919 by-election	William Jellett (U)	Robert Woods (Ind U)	2 seats under 1918 Act	
2nd	1921	Ernest Alton (Ind U)	James Craig (Ind U)	William Thrift (Ind U)	Gerald Fitzgibbon (Ind U)
3rd	1922	Ernest Alton (Ind.)	James Craig (Ind.)	William Thrift (Ind.)	Gerald Fitzgibbon (Ind.)
4th	1923	Ernest Alton (Ind.)	James Craig (Ind.)	William Thrift (Ind.)	3 seats from 1923
5th	1927 (Jun)	Ernest Alton (Ind.)	James Craig (Ind.)	William Thrift (Ind.)	3 seats from 1923
6th	1927 (Sep)	Ernest Alton (Ind.)	James Craig (Ind.)	William Thrift (Ind.)	3 seats from 1923
7th	1932	Ernest Alton (Ind.)	James Craig (Ind.)	William Thrift (Ind.)	3 seats from 1923
8th	1933	Ernest Alton (Ind.)	James Craig (Ind.)	William Thrift (Ind.)	3 seats from 1923
8th	1933 by-election	Ernest Alton (Ind.)	Robert Rowlette (Ind.)	William Thrift (Ind.)	3 seats from 1923
