= Walter Travers =

English Puritan theologian

2nd Provost of Trinity College Dublin
- In office 1 August 1594 – 30 July 1598
- Preceded by: Adam Loftus
- Succeeded by: Henry Alvey

Personal details
- Born: 9 March 1548 Crewe, Cheshire, England
- Died: 2 January 1635 (aged 86) London, England
- Education: Christ's College, Cambridge; Trinity College, Cambridge

Walter Travers (9 March 1548 - 1 February 1635) was an English Puritan theologian who served as the 2nd Provost of Trinity College Dublin from 1594 to 1598. He was also at one time chaplain to William Cecil, 1st Baron Burghley, and tutor to his son Robert Cecil, 1st Earl of Salisbury, who both served Queen Elizabeth I during her reign.

He is remembered mostly as an opponent of the teaching of Richard Hooker. He was educated at the University of Cambridge, where he was admitted to Christ's College before migrating to Trinity, and then traveled to Geneva to visit Theodore Beza. He was ordained by Thomas Cartwright in Antwerp, where in the late 1570s his work was favoured by the encouragement of Sir Francis Walsingham and Henry Killigrew (diplomat). He was a lecturer at the Temple Church in London in 1581, until he was forbidden to preach by Archbishop Whitgift in March 1586.

He was Provost of Trinity College Dublin from 1594 to 1598.

Academic offices
Preceded by Adam Loftus	Provost of Trinity College Dublin; 1594–1598	Succeeded by Henry Alvey
