= Number of parliamentarians in the Fifth French Republic =

The number of members of the two houses of the French Parliament, deputies to the National Assembly (lower house) and members of the Senate (upper house), is set by law, in the Electoral Code, with a cap introduced in the Constitution in 2008. There have been 577 deputies since 1986 and 348 senators since 2011, which is the constitutional cap, for a total of 925.

== History ==
Legislatures	1st	2nd	3rd	4th	5th	6th	7th	8th
Number of MPs	579	482	487	487	490	491	491	577
Legislatures	9th	10th	11th	12th	13th	14th	15th	16th
Number of MPs	577	577	577	577	577	577	577	577

== See also ==
- Number of Westminster MPs
