= Milo Mac Thady O'Connor =

Milo Mac Thady O'Connor was an Irish priest in the second half of the thirteenth century and was the first recorded Archdeacon of Clonmacnoise (recorded as holding the office in 1260).
