= Henry Alvey =

Former vice-chancellor of the University of Dublin

3rd Provost of Trinity College, Dublin
- In office 1 August 1601 – 14 June 1609
- Preceded by: Walter Travers
- Succeeded by: William Temple

President of St John's College, Cambridge
- In office 11 July 1590 – 30 July 1601
- Preceded by: Charles King
- Succeeded by: Henry Aston

Personal details
- Born: 28 April 1550 York, England
- Died: 11 March 1627 (aged 76) Kildare, Ireland
- Resting place: Trinity College Chapel
- Education: St John's College, Cambridge (B.A., 1576; M.A., 1579; B.D., 1586)

Henry Alvey (28 April 1550 - 11 March 1627) was an English Anglican bishop who served as the 3rd Provost of Trinity College, Dublin and President of St John's College, Cambridge from 1590 to 1601.

Alvey gained his B.A. degree at St John's College, Cambridge in 1575/6, his M.A. in 1579, and his B.D. in 1586. He was elected a Fellow of St John's College, Cambridge in 1577, and became President of the College in 1590. In 1601, he relocated to Ireland, where he became Provost of Trinity College, Dublin. He returned to Cambridge in 1609. An outbreak of plague in June 1604 caused a temporary closure of the College, and again he retired to England until June 1605. Alvey was a conscientious Puritan who kept meticulous accounts. Though Provost for eight years, he resided for not much over five, and left little or no mark on Trinity. He was Vice-Chancellor of the University of Dublin from 1609 to 1612.

To St. John's College, Alvey bequeathed a number of his own books as well as 100 marks for purchasing books.

== See also ==
- Richard Alvey (priest)

Academic offices
Preceded by Walter Travers	Provost of Trinity College Dublin; 1601–1609	Succeeded by Sir William Temple
