= Benjamin Pratt =

Irish university administrator (c.1669–1721)

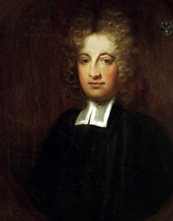

18th Provost of Trinity College Dublin
- In office 1 August 1710 – 30 July 1717
- Preceded by: Peter Browne
- Succeeded by: Richard Baldwin

Personal details
- Born: 17 April 1669 Summerhill, County Meath, Ireland
- Died: 22 June 1721 (aged 52) Bath, Somerset, England
- Education: Trinity College Dublin

Benjamin Pratt (17 April 1669 – 22 June 1721) was an Anglo-Irish academic who served as the 18th Provost of Trinity College Dublin from 1710 to 1717. He was later Dean of Down.

== Life ==
Pratt was born in 1669 in Garradice, near Summerhill, County Meath. He was the son of a landowner. In 1692, he graduated from Trinity College; the following year, he was elected a Fellow. In 1710, Provost Peter Browne, after having been invited by Queen Anne, successfully recommended Pratt as Provost. Pratt was forced to resign his post as Provost in 1717, due to the threat of an inquiry into his alleged Jacobite sympathies.

Academic offices
Preceded by Peter Browne	Provost of Trinity College Dublin; 1710–1717	Succeeded by Richard Baldwin
