= Robert Ussher =

Irish priest (1592–1642)

The Right Reverend Robert Ussher

6th Provost of Trinity College Dublin
- In office 1 August 1629 – 30 July 1634
- Preceded by: William Bedell
- Succeeded by: William Chappell

Personal details
- Born: 4 April 1592 Dublin, Ireland
- Died: 7 August 1642 (aged 50) Ellesmere, Shropshire, England
- Education: Trinity College, Dublin (B.A., 1612; M.A., 1614; B.D., 1621)

Robert Ussher (4 April 1592 – 7 September 1642) was an Irish Protestant bishop who served as the 6th Provost of Trinity College Dublin 1629 to 1634. He was also Bishop of Kildare for some time.

== Life ==
The youngest son of Henry Ussher, Archbishop of Armagh and his first wife Margaret Eliot, daughter of Thomas Elliott of Balreask, he was educated at Trinity College Dublin, being made a fellow in 1611, and graduating B.A. 1612, M.A. 1614, vice provost 1615; B.D. 1621. He was prebendary of St. Audoen's Church, Dublin (1617); rector of Ardstra (1617); prebendary of Dromaragh (1624); and rector of Lurgan (1629).

On the death in 1627 of Sir William Temple, there was a disputed election to the Provostship. The senior Fellows elected Joseph Mead, who declined; the junior Fellows elected Ussher (14 April 1627), and he was sworn in the same day. He was set aside by royal letter in favor of William Bedell, who was sworn in on 16 August. On Bedell's promotion as Bishop of Kilmore, Ussher was again elected (3 October 1629) and sworn in on 13 January 1630. He owed his appointment to a temperate letter in his favour by his cousin, James Ussher, to whom an appeal had been made.

He was an able preacher, promoted the study of the Irish language, and defended the college's charter rights; but was considered too dovish by the formidable Thomas Wentworth, 1st Earl of Strafford. On 11 August 1634, he resigned the Provostship on being appointed Archdeacon of Meath. On 25 February 1635, he was consecrated Bishop of Kildare. He died at Panta Birsley, near Ellesmere, Shropshire, on 7 September 1642, and was buried at Dudleston (Doddleston) Chapel, near Oswestry. He married Jane, eldest daughter of Francis Kynaston of Pantabirsley, and left children. Many thought his early death at fifty to have been hastened by the troubles of the English Civil War.

Academic offices
Preceded by William Bedell	Provost of Trinity College Dublin; 1629–1634	Succeeded by William Chappell
