= Albert Joseph McConnell =

Irish mathematician and mathematical physicist

39th Provost of Trinity College Dublin
- In office 1 August 1952 – 1 August 1974
- Preceded by: Ernest Alton
- Succeeded by: F. S. L. Lyons

Member of the Council of State
- In office 2 January 1973 – 24 June 1973
- Appointed by: Éamon de Valera

Personal details
- Born: 19 November 1903 Ballymena, County Antrim, Ireland
- Died: 24 August 1993 (aged 89) Dublin, Ireland
- Education: Trinity College Dublin (B.A., 1926); Sapienza University of Rome (Ph.D., 1928)

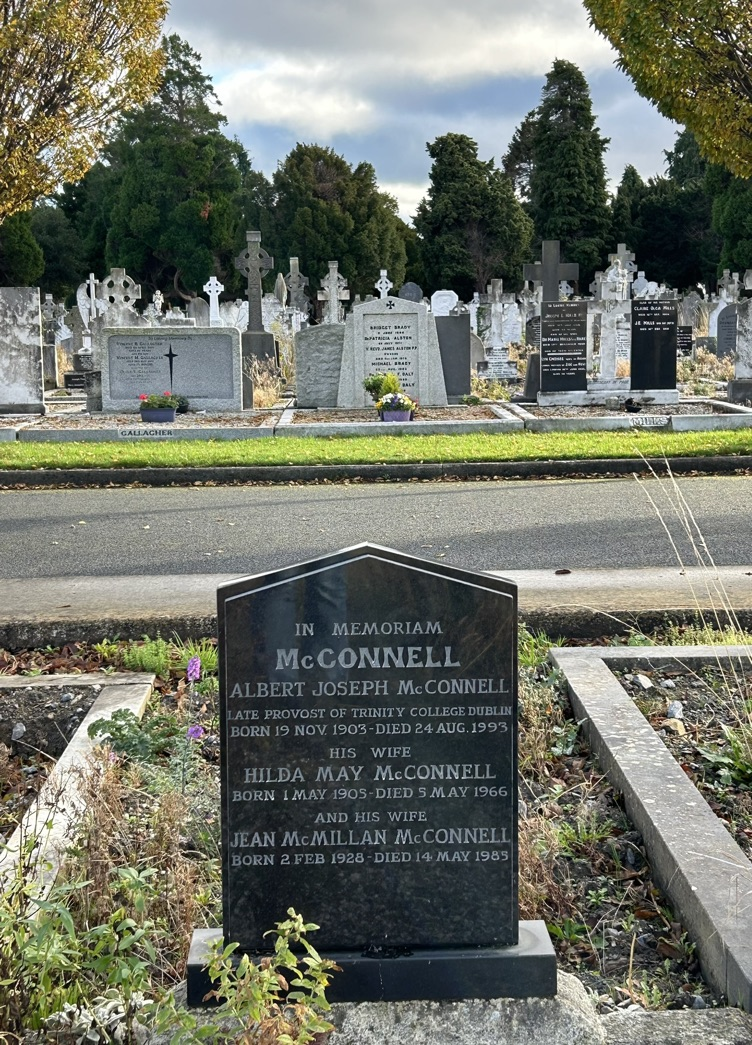
Grave of Albert Joseph McConnell at Deangrange Cemetery,Co. Dublin

Albert Joseph McConnell (19 November 1903 – 19 November 1993) was an Irish mathematician and mathematical physicist who served as the 39th Provost of Trinity College Dublin from 1952 to 1974 and a member of the Council of State from January 1973 to June 1973. He spent his entire academic career at Trinity College Dublin.

He was born in Ballymena, County Antrim, in 1903. He studied Mathematics and Philosophy at Trinity College Dublin, graduating with a B.A. in 1926. He carried out his postgraduate studies in the Sapienza University of Rome under the direction of Professor Tullio Levi-Civita and was awarded his doctorate there in 1928. That same year, he was the official Irish delegate to the International Congress of Mathematicians in Bologna, where he gave an invited address on "The Torsion of Riemannian Space"

Upon returning to Trinity College, he was appointed Professor of Natural Philosophy (Physics) and was elected Fellow in 1930. He specialized in tensor calculus and published the book Applications of the Absolute Differential Calculus in 1931. He later co-edited The Mathematical Papers of Sir William Rowan Hamilton: Volume 2, Dynamics (1940).

He was appointed Provost of Trinity College in 1952 and served for 22 years until his retirement in 1974. As he was elected for life, his retirement was voluntary. During his tenure he reformed the structures of Trinity, allowing more junior academics to hold offices such as Bursar, Senior Lecturer, and Registrar. He also oversaw the reform allowing women to be elected as Fellows and Scholars of Trinity College and to be entitled to reside on campus.

On his retirement he was appointed by President Éamon de Valera to the Council of State.

== Books ==
- 1940 The Mathematical Papers of Sir William Rowan Hamilton: Volume 2, Dynamics, Cambridge, (co-edited with A. W. Conway)
- 1931 Applications of the Absolute Differential Calculus, Blackie & Son, reprinted by Dover in 1947 as Applications of Tensor Analysis

Academic offices
Preceded by Ernest Alton	Provost of Trinity College Dublin; 1952–1974	Succeeded by F. S. L. Lyons
