= Richard Blount (died 1556) =

English politician

Richard Blount (by 1512 – 1 January 1556), of Calais and London, was an English politician.

He was a member (MP) of the parliament of England for Calais in 1545.
