= James Martin (philosopher) =

James Martin (Jacobus Martinus, Jacques Martin) (fl. 1577) was a Scottish philosophical writer and early Ramist.

== Life ==
He was a native of Dunkeld, Perthshire, and is said to have been educated at the University of Oxford. A James Martin, whose college is not mentioned, commenced M.A. at Oxford on 31 March 1522.

He was professor of philosophy at Paris. In 1556 he was proctor of the Germans in the University of Paris, and in May 1557 was chosen by them to negotiate with the king concerning a tax which he desired to impose on the university. He subsequently is said to have become professor at Turin. He was dead by 1584.

== Works ==
Martin wrote a 1577 treatise in refutation of some of Aristotle's dogmas in Generation of Animals. Another edition appeared, with a preface by William Temple. A reply by Andreas Libavius appeared at Frankfort in 1591.

Other treatises by Martin are vaguely mentioned by Thomas Tanner in his Bibliotheca Britannico-Hibernica (1718), viz.: 1. In Artem Memoriae, Paris. 2. De Intelligentiis Motricibus, Turin. 3. In Libros Aristotelis de Ortu et Interitu, Paris, 1555. None of them appear to be now extant.
