= Bryan Alton =

Irish physician and politician (1919–1991)

Senator
- In office 23 June 1965 – 1 June 1973
- Constituency: National University

Personal details
- Born: 5 June 1919 Dublin, Ireland
- Died: 18 January 1991 (aged 71) Dublin, Ireland
- Party: Independent
- Spouse: Winifred Tempany (m. 1950)
- Children: 7
- Relatives: Ernest Alton (uncle)
- Education: University College Dublin

Bryan Gerard Alton (5 June 1919 – 18 January 1991) was an Irish physician and member of Seanad Éireann from 1965 to 1973.

He born in Dublin on 5 June 1919, the only child of Norman Alton, a bank inspector, and his wife, Mary Frances (née Hayes). He was educated at St Mary's College, Dublin, Castleknock College and University College Dublin (UCD). He graduated from UCD in 1946 with a degree in medicine.

He was the personal doctor of Éamon de Valera. His uncle Ernest Alton, was also a Senator.

He was elected to the 11th Seanad in 1965 for the National University constituency. He was re-elected to the Seanad in 1969. He did not contest the 1973 Seanad election.

He was president of the Royal College of Physicians of Ireland from 1974 to 1977.
