= Eustace Abington =

16th-century English politician

- Died: 1569
- Occupation: politician

Eustace Abington (by 1524 – 1569 or later), of Calais and Hertfordshire, was an English politician.

== Career ==
Abington was a Member of Parliament for Calais in 1545. There is a record of his burial in the parish register of St Dunstan-in-the-East, London, on 8 May 1579.
