= Minuscule 325 =

- New Testament manuscript
- Text: New Testament (except Gospels)
- Date: 11th century
- Script: Greek
- Now at: Bodleian Library
- Size: 28 cm by 18.5 cm
- Type: Byzantine text-type
- Category: V
- Note: marginalia

Minuscule 325 (in the Gregory-Aland numbering), α 111 (Soden), is a Greek minuscule manuscript of the New Testament, on parchment. Palaeographically it has been assigned to the 11th century. Formerly it was labelled by 30^{a}, 36^{p}, and 9^{r}. It has marginalia.

== Description ==
The codex contains the text of the New Testament (except Gospels) on 233 parchment leaves (28 cm by 18.5 cm) with some lacunae. The text is written in one column per page, in 24 lines per page. It begins with text of Acts 15:19, but the text from Acts 15:19 to 2 John was supplied in the 13th century.

It contains Prolegomena, tables of the κεφαλαια (tables of contents) before each book, some numerals of the κεφαλαια (chapters) are given at the margin, subscriptions at the end of each book, and numbers of στιχοι. It has numerous notes.

The order of books: Acts, 3 John, Jude, Jude, Apocalypse, and the Pauline epistles (as in 175, 336).

== Text ==
The Greek text of the codex is a representative of the Byzantine text-type. Aland placed it in Category V.

== History ==
Robert Huntington brought this manuscript from the East to England (along with minuscule 67). It was used by John Mill (Hunt 1). C. R. Gregory saw the manuscript in 1883.

Formerly it was labelled by 30^{a}, 36^{p}, and 9^{r}. In 1908 Gregory gave it the number 325.

The manuscript is currently housed at the Bodleian Library (MS. Auct.E.5.9) at Oxford.

== See also ==
- List of New Testament minuscules
- Biblical manuscript
- Textual criticism
