= Dillon Ashe =

Irish Anglican cleric

Dillon Ashe, D.D. (1666-1724) was an Anglican Archdeacon in Ireland in the first half of the eighteenth century.

Ashe was born in County Meath, son of Thomas Ashe and Mary St George, and educated at Trinity College, Dublin and Magdalen Hall, Oxford. The incumbent at Finglas, he became a Canon of Killala in 1693, Archdeacon of Clogher in 1704, Chancellor of Clogher in 1705, and Chancellor of Armagh in 1706. He made his will on 10 July. His brother St George Ashe was successively Bishop of Cloyne, Clogher and Derry between 1695 and 1718.

A friend of Jonathan Swift (who called him "Dilly"), he died in 1724.
