= Anthony Martin (bishop) =

Anglo-Irish Anglican priest

Reverend Anthony Martin

9th Provost of Trinity College Dublin
- In office 1 August 1645 – 11 July 1650
- Preceded by: Richard Washington
- Succeeded by: Samuel Winter

Personal details
- Born: 14 December 1592 Galway, Ireland
- Died: 9 March 1650 (aged 57) Westminster, London, England
- Education: Emmanuel College, Cambridge; Trinity College, Cambridge

Anthony Martin (14 December 1592 - 9 March 1650) was an Anglo-Irish Anglican priest who served as Provost of Trinity College Dublin from 1645 to 1650. He played a prominent role in the religious and political life of Ireland during the 17th century Martin is known for his contributions to the ecclesiastical affairs of Ireland and his efforts to strengthen the Church of Ireland during a time of religious and political upheaval.

== Early life and education ==
Martin was born in County Galway and educated at Emmanuel College, Cambridge and Trinity College, Cambridge. Martin became Vicar of Yagoestown in 1618. He was Prebendary of Castleknock at St Patrick's Cathedral, Dublin from 1619 to 1620; and Archdeacon of Dublin from then until 1625. He was also Rector of Battersea, Treasurer of Cashel Cathedral and Dean of Waterford 'in commendam

== Ecclesiastical career ==
Martin was the Bishop of Meath from 1624 (and Provost of Trinity College Dublin)

Martin's rise within the ranks of the Church of Ireland began when he was appointed Dean of Waterford in 1614. He later became Dean of Kilkenny before his consecration as Bishop of Meath in 1625. His tenure as bishop was marked by a strong commitment to the Anglican faith and the consolidation of the Church of Ireland's position in Irish society.

As Bishop of Meath, Martin had significant influence, both spiritually and politically. He was a staunch defender of the Protestant Reformation in Ireland and worked to ensure that the Church of Ireland maintained its role as the established church. His leadership extended beyond his diocese, as he often collaborated with other ecclesiastical leaders in promoting Protestantism and countering Catholic influence in Ireland.

== Legacy and death ==
Bishop Anthony Martin died in July 1650. His legacy is tied to his efforts to strengthen the Church of Ireland and his role in the political and religious struggles of his time. He is remembered as a pivotal figure in the history of Irish Anglicanism during a period of significant change and conflict.

Academic offices
Preceded by Richard Washington	Provost of Trinity College Dublin; 1645–1650	Succeeded by Samuel Winter
