= Samuel Winter =

English clergyman and academic

The Very Reverend Samuel Winter

10th Provost of Trinity College Dublin
- In office 3 June 1652 – 29 March 1660
- Preceded by: Anthony Martin
- Succeeded by: Thomas Seele

Personal details
- Born: 12 December 1603 Temple Balsall, Warwickshire, England
- Died: 7 October 1666 (aged 62) Rutland, England
- Resting place: North Luffenham, Rutland, England
- Spouse(s): Anne Beeston (m. 1625; d. 1640); Elizabeth Weaver (m. 1643; d. 1666)
- Children: 5
- Education: King Henry VIII School, Coventry
- Alma mater: Emmanuel College, Cambridge; Queens' College, Cambridge

Samuel Winter D.D. (12 December 1603 – 7 October 1666) was an English clergyman and academic who served as the 10th Provost of Trinity College Dublin 1652 to 1660.

== Early life ==
The son of Christopher Winter of Oxfordshire, he was born at Temple Balsall, Warwickshire, in 1603. He early received religious impressions from the preaching of Slader, a Puritan divine for whom his father had obtained the neighbouring chapel of Knowle. His father sent him in 1617 to King Henry VIII School, Coventry, where William Dugdale was his contemporary under James Cranford. He went on to Emmanuel College and Queens' College, Cambridge, his tutor being John Preston.

== Career ==
=== Early career ===
After graduating M.A., Winter placed himself under John Cotton, vicar of Boston, Lincolnshire, with a view to preparation for the ministry. Cotton found him a rich wife, and led him to the Independent position in religion. Recovering from illness, he became perpetual curate of Woodborough in Nottinghamshire, and developed his preaching. He obtained a lectureship at York, but after the outbreak of the First English Civil War, left it in 1642 for the vicarage of Cottingham in the East Riding of Yorkshire. Here he organised a church on the congregational model.

=== Trinity College, Dublin ===
Winter went to Ireland as chaplain to the four parliamentary commissioners. He went about the country with them, preaching. By 3 September 1651, the commissioners appointed him Provost of Trinity College Dublin, in succession to Anthony Martin who had died of the plague in 1650. On 18 November 1651, he performed the acts for B.D. On 3 June 1652, his appointment as Provost was confirmed by Oliver Cromwell. The degree of D.D. was conferred upon him by special grace on 17 August 1654; Henry Jones being vice-chancellor.

Winter took trouble over the college estates; he secured the appointment (24 November 1656) of a lecturer in Hebrew, John Sterne; he made Greek and Hebrew compulsory subjects (14 June 1659) for the B.A. degree, and he imported men of learning from England as fellows. He kept up his preaching engagements, adding a lecture every three weeks at Maynooth. John Bridges induced him in 1655 to take the lead in forming a clerical association in which independents, Presbyterians, and Episcopalians could all meet.

The Third Protectorate Parliament summoned Winter to London (13 August 1659). He was retained as Provost and elected (28 November) divinity lecturer. But on 29 March 1660, he was called on to produce the charter of the college, and a copy of the statutory oath to be taken by provosts. This oath Winter had not taken, the pretext was used as a means of setting him aside. The money he had advanced to the college was never fully repaid. The government of the college was given (6 November) to Thomas Seele, a senior fellow, who was admitted Provost on 19 January 1661. The independent church that he had formed at the Church of St. Nicholas Within was ministered to by Samuel Mather and lasted into the 19th century.

From this point on Winter spent his time with friends at Chester and Coventry, and with his wife's relatives in Hertfordshire and Rutland. He fell ill in October 1666 in Rutland, preached privately the next Sunday, and then took to his bed, dying on 24 December 1666. He was buried at North Luffenham, Rutland.

== Works ==
Winter published The Summe of Diverse Sermons Preached in Dublin, Dublin, 1656 (in favour of infant baptism). He was one of several joint authors of the life (1657) of John Murcot.

== Family ==
Winter left a good estate, thanks to the management of his second wife. His first wife was Anne Beeston (or Bestoe), by whom he had five sons. Three years after her death at Cottingham he married (before 1650) Elizabeth, daughter of Christopher Weaver, a woman of property, and with strong Baptist leanings.

== Notes ==
Attribution

- This article incorporates text from a publication now in the public domain: Gordon, Alexander (1900). "Winter, Samuel". In Lee, Sidney (ed.). Dictionary of National Biography. Vol. 62. London: Smith, Elder & Co. pp. 216–217.
  - Life, 1671, by J. W. (probably his brother-in-law, Weaver);
  - Clarke's Lives of Eminent Persons, 1683, i. 95; (reproduction of most of Life by J. W.)
  - Calamy's Account, 1713, p. 544; (abridged version of Life by J. W.)
  - Calamy's Continuation, 1727, ii. 721;
  - Erasmus Middleton's Biographia Evangelica, 1784, iii. 387 (abridged account of Life by J. W. with additions), and in Colvile's Worthies of Warwickshire, 1870, p. 831;
  - Reliquiæ Baxterianæ, 1696;
  - Armstrong's App. to Martineau's Ordination Service, 1829, p. 78;
  - Pishey Thompson, History of Boston, 1856, p. 784;
  - Reid's History of Presbyterian Church in Ireland (Killen), 1871, p. 556;
  - Stubbs's History of University of Dublin, 1889, pp. 89 sq.;
  - William Urwick the younger's Early History of Trinity College Dublin, 1892, pp. 57 sq.

Academic offices
Preceded by Anthony Martin	Provost of Trinity College Dublin; 1661–1675	Succeeded by Thomas Seele
