= William Chappell (bishop) =

English scholar and clergyman

The Right Reverend William Chappell

7th Provost of Trinity College Dublin
- In office 1 August 1634 – 31 July 1640
- Preceded by: Robert Ussher
- Succeeded by: Richard Washington

Personal details
- Born: 10 December 1582 Mansfield, Nottinghamshire, England
- Died: 14 May 1649 (aged 66) London, England
- Education: Christ's College, Cambridge

William Chappell (10 December 1582 – 14 May 1649) was an English scholar and clergyman who served as the 7th Provost of Trinity College Dublin from 1634 to 1640. He became Church of Ireland bishop of Cork and Ross.

== Early life and education ==
Chappell was born in Mansfield, Nottinghamshire, in 1582. He was educated at Christ's College, Cambridge, where he became Fellow in 1607. His pupils at Christ's included John Lightfoot, Henry More, John Shawe, and John Milton.

In Milton's case, friction with Chappell may have caused him to leave the college temporarily (a rustication) in 1626. Another explanation is that plague caused an absence and that Milton's Elegy I have been over-interpreted. He shared Chappell as a tutor with Edward King – his Lycidas – and it is thought that Damoetas in the poem refers to Chappell (or possibly Joseph Mede).

On his return, Milton was taught by Nathaniel Tovey. Despite their problems, Milton may have learned from Chappell, who was a theoretician of preaching; this aspect of Milton is discussed in Jameela Lares, Milton and the Preaching Arts (2001). She suggests Andreas Hyperius, and his De formandis concionibus sacris (1553), as influential on Chappell and other writers on preaching and sermon types. Chappell was a pupil of William Ames, who left Christ's in 1610. Like Ames, he was a Ramist, though he differed from the Calvinist Ames on doctrine. Chappell was an Arminian, with strong anti-predestinarian beliefs. Lares argues for Chappell as the link to the older Christ's preaching tradition, Milton connected back to William Perkins.

In any case, Chappell had a reputation then for strictness, and for being a hard man in a Latin disputation. Stories gathered about him: John Aubrey, an unreliable source, suggested Chappell had beaten Milton. One of Chappell's disputation opponents was supposedly James I, crushed in Oxford; another (William Roberts in 1615, later bishop of Bangor) allegedly had fainted. The anonymous The Whole Duty of Man (1658) has been attributed to Chappell, though modern opinion suggests Richard Allestree.

== Career ==
Later Chappell was in favour with William Laud and received preferments in Ireland. He was Dean of Cashel from 1633 to 1638 and was soon asked to reform Trinity College Dublin. He was Provost there from 1634 to 1640, replacing Robert Ussher, with Wentworth's backing; amongst other changes, he put an end to the use of and teaching in the Irish language. He was then made Bishop of Cork in 1638.

== Later life ==
With Laud's fall, he was denounced by his fellows, and he was imprisoned in Dublin, in 1641, and later in Tenby, before being released. He then lived in retirement in Nottinghamshire. A monument to him was made in a church at Bilsthorpe. Chappell died in London in 1649.

== Works ==
- Methodus Concionandi (1648)
- Use of Scripture (1653)
- The Preacher, or the Art and Method of Preaching (1656) translation of Methodus Concionandi

== Notes and references ==
=== Sources ===
- Reynolds, Matthew (2005). Godly Reformers and Their Opponents in Early Modern England. Woodbridge: The Boydell Press.

Academic offices
Preceded by Robert Ussher	Provost of Trinity College Dublin; 1634–1640	Succeeded by Richard Washington
Church of Ireland titles
Preceded by Richard Boyle; Bishop of Cork, Cloyne and Ross	Bishop of Cork and Ross; 1638–1649	Succeeded by Michael Boyle; Bishop of Cork, Cloyne and Ross
