= List of provosts of Trinity College Dublin =

The following persons have been provost of Trinity College Dublin.

List of provosts of Trinity College Dublin
No.	Name	Tenure	Lifetime	Notes
1	Adam Loftus	1592–1594	c.1533–1605	Also was Archbishop of Armagh, Archbishop of Dublin and Lord Chancellor of Ireland.
2	Walter Travers	1594–1598	c.1548–1634	
3	Henry Alvey	1601–1609		
4	Sir William Temple	1609–1627	c.1555–1627	
5	William Bedell	1627–1629	c.1571–1642	Later became Bishop of Kilmore and Ardagh in 1629.
6	Robert Ussher	1629–1634		Later became Bishop of Kildare 1636–1642.
7	William Chappell	1634–1640	c.1582–1649	Also was Bishop of Cork and Ross 1638–1649.
8	Richard Washington	1640–1641		
9	Anthony Martin	1645–1650	d. 1650	Also was Bishop of Meath 1625–1650
10	Samuel Winter	1652–1660	c.1603–1666	
11	Thomas Seele	1661–1675	c.1611–1675	Also was Dean of St. Patrick's Cathedral, Dublin 1666–1675
12	Michael Ward	1674–1678	c.1643–1681	Later became Bishop of Ossory in 1678, transferred to Derry in 1680.
13	Narcissus Marsh	1679–1683	c.1638–1713	Later became Bishop of Ferns and Leighlin 1683, then Archbishop of Cashel in 1690, Archbishop of Dublin in 1694, and Archbishop of Armagh in 1703.
14	Robert Huntington	1683–1692	c.1636–1701	Later became Bishop of Raphoe from July to September 1701. In Huntington's absence from 1688, James II appointed Michael Moore, Catholic vicar-general of Dublin, as head of the college for a short period from 1689 until 1690; noted for along with the librarian Fr. McCarthy, protecting the library from pillage and burning. He was later Rector of the University of Paris.
15	St George Ashe	1692–1695	c.1658–1718	Later became bishop of Cloyne in 1695, translated to Clogher in 1697, and finally to Derry in 1717.
16	George Browne	1695–1699	c.1649–1699	
17	Peter Browne	1699–1710	c.1665–1735	Later became Bishop of Cork and Ross 1710–1735.
18	Benjamin Pratt	1710–1717	c.1669–1721	Later became Dean of Down 1717–1721.
19	Richard Baldwin	1717–1758	c.1668–1758	
20	Francis Andrews	1758–1774	c.1718–1774	He left £3,000 to found the Dunsink Observatory and the Andrews chair of astronomy.
21	John Hely-Hutchinson	1774–1794	c.1724–1794	
22	Richard Murray	1795–1799	c.1726–1799	
23	John Kearney	1799–1806	c.1742–1813	Later became Bishop of Ossory 1806–1813.
24	George Hall	1806–1811	c.1753–1811	Later became Bishop of Dromore 17–23 November 1811.
25	Thomas Elrington	1811–1820	c.1760–1835	Later became Bishop of Limerick, Ardfert and Aghadoe in 1820, then translated to Ferns and Leighlin in 1822.
26	Samuel Kyle	1820–1831	c.1771–1848	Later became Bishop of Cork and Ross 1831–1835, and Bishop of Cork, Cloyne and Ross 1835–1848
27	Bartholomew Lloyd	1831–1837	c.1772–1837	
28	Franc Sadleir	1837–1851	c.1774–1851	
29	Richard MacDonnell	1851–1867	c.1787–1867	
30	Humphrey Lloyd	1867–1881	c.1800–1881	
31	John Hewitt Jellett	1881–1888	c.1817–1888	
32	George Salmon	1888–1904	c.1819–1904	Also was Chancellor of St Patrick's Cathedral, Dublin 1871–1904.
33	Anthony Traill	1904–1914	c.1838–1914	
34	Sir John Pentland Mahaffy	1914–1919	c.1839–1919	
35	John Henry Bernard	1919–1927	c.1860–1927	Formerly Dean of St Patrick's Cathedral, Dublin 1902–1911, Bishop of Ossory, Ferns and Leighlin 1911–1915, and Archbishop of Dublin 1915–1919.
36	Edward John Gwynn	1927–1937	c.1868–1941	
37	William Thrift	1937–1942	c.1870–1942	TD for Dublin University 1921–1937
38	Ernest Alton	1942–1952	c.1873–1952	TD for Dublin University 1921–1937, Senator for Dublin University 1938–1943
39	Albert Joseph McConnell	1952–1974	1903–1993	
40	F. S. L. Lyons	1974–1981	1923–1983	
41	William Arthur Watts	1981–1991	1930–2010	
42	Thomas Mitchell	1991–2001	b. 1939	First Catholic to be Provost since Michael Moore in 1690.
43	John Hegarty	2001–2011		
44	Patrick Prendergast	2011–2021		
45	Linda Doyle	2021–		elected 10 April 2021 to take office 1 August 2021. First woman elected provost.
