= Minuscule 67 =

- New Testament manuscript
- Name: Galei Londinensis
- Text: Gospels †
- Date: 10th century
- Script: Greek
- Found: Robert Huntington
- Now at: Bodleian Library
- Size: 23.5 cm by 18 cm
- Type: Byzantine text-type
- Category: none
- Note: marginalia

Minuscule 67 (in the Gregory-Aland numbering), ε 150 (von Soden), known as Codex Galei Londinensis, is a Greek minuscule manuscript of the New Testament, on parchment leaves. Palaeographically it has been assigned to the 10th century. The manuscript is lacunose. Some leaves of the codex were lost. It has full marginalia.

== Description ==
The codex contains the text of the four Gospels on 202 leaves (size 23.5 cm by 18 cm) with only one but large lacuna (John 6:65-21:25). The text is written in two columns per page, 20 lines per page. The initial letters written in gold and colour.

The text is divided according to the κεφαλαια (chapters), whose numbers are given at the margin, and their τιτλοι (titles of chapters) at the top of the pages. There is also another division according to the smaller Ammonian Sections (Matthew 355; Mark 235 – 16:12; Luke 342), with references to the Eusebian Canons.

It contains the Eusebian tables, tables of the κεφαλαια (tables of contents) before every Gospel, lectionary markings at the margin (for liturgical use), and subscriptions at the end of each Gospel. It contains the Athanasian symbol on folio 3 recto.

Kurt Aland the Greek text of the codex did not place in any Category. According to the Claremont Profile Method it represents textual family K^{x} in Luke 10. It has mixed text in Luke 1. In Luke 20 it has a mixture of Byzantine families.

== History ==
The manuscript is dated on the palaeographical ground to the 10th century.

Robert Huntington, Bishop of Raphoe († 1701), brought the manuscript from the East (along with 325). It was examined by Mill (as Hunt. 2). C. R. Gregory saw it in 1883.

It is currently housed at the Bodleian Library (MS. Auct. E. 5. 11), at Oxford.

== See also ==
- List of New Testament minuscules
- Biblical manuscript
- Textual criticism
