= Thomas Broke =

Member of the Parliament of England

Thomas Broke or Brooke (fl. 1550), translator, was an alderman of Calais, the chief clerk of the exchequer and customer there at the time when the preaching of William Smith at Our Lady's Church in that town led many persons, and Broke among them, to adopt 'reformed' opinions.

Broke was a member of parliament, sitting for Calais, and in July 1539 spoke strongly against the Six Articles Bill, though Cromwell sent to warn him to forbear doing so as he loved his life. Part of his speech is preserved by Foxe (Acts and Monuments, v. 503). He was roughly answered by Sir William Kingston, comptroller of the king's household, who was reproved by the speaker for his attempt to interfere with the freedom of debate.

The next month, at the trial of Ralph Hare, a soldier of Calais, for heresy, Broke intervened on the prisoner's behalf, and was rebuked by Richard Gwent, the Dean of Arches. Half an hour later he found himself accused of the same crime on the information of the council of Calais, and on 10 August was committed to the Fleet Prison along with John Butler, a priest of the same town, who was also a 'sacramentary.' As, however, the Calais witnesses could prove nothing against him, he was released.

In 1540, 32 Henry VIII, the king demised two chapels in the parish of Monkton, in the liberty of the Cinque Ports, to a Thomas Broke for 42l. 7s. 11d. As Broke the translator was paymaster of Dover in 1549 (see below), it is at least possible that he was the lessee.

Another attempt was made against Broke in the spring of 1540. His servant was imprisoned by the council of Calais and strictly examined as to his master's conduct, and 'the second Monday after Easter' Broke was committed to the mayor's gaol, 'whither no man of his calling was ever committed unless sentence of death had first been pronounced upon him;' for otherwise he should have been imprisoned in a brother alderman's house. All his goods were seized, and his wife and children thrust into a mean part of his house by Sir Edward Kingston. Indignant at such treatment, Mistress Broke answered a threat of Kingston's with 'Well, sir, well, the king's slaughter-house had wrong when you were made a gentleman' (Foxe, v. 576). She wrote to complain to Cromwell and to other friends, and, finding that her letters were seized by the council, sent a secret messenger to England to carry the news of the sufferings of her husband and of those imprisoned with him. On receiving her message, Cromwell ordered that the prisoners should be sent over for trial, and on May Day they were led through the streets of Calais, Broke being in irons as the 'chief captain' of the rest. Broke was committed to the Fleet, and lay there for about two years. At the end of that time he and his twelve companions were released 'in very poor estate.'

In 1550 the name of Thomas Broke occurs among the chief sectaries of Kent. Although from the character of his literary work it is impossible to suppose that Broke the translator could have been one of the 'Anabaptists and Pelagians' spoken of by Strype (Memorials, II. i. 369), yet if, as seems likely, he was dissatisfied with the new Book of Common Prayer, he may have belonged to a separate congregation, and so have been described as sharing the opinions of the majority of the sectaries of the district.

== Works ==
His works are:

- 'Certeyn Meditacions and Things to be had in Remembraunce … by euery Christian before he receiue the Sacrament of the Body and Bloude of Christ, compiled by T. Broke,' 1548.
- 'Of the Life and Conuersacion of a Christen Man … wrytten in the Latin tonge by Maister John Caluyne. … Translated into English by Thomas Broke, Esquire, Paymaster of Douer,' 1549. In the prologue of this translation the identity of Broke with the alderman of Calais is made clear. 'I have (good reader),' he writes, 'translated a good part more of the institution of a Christen man, wrytten by this noble clerke which I cannot nowe put in printe, partly through mine owne busynes as well at Douer as at Calleis.'
- The preface to 'Geneua. The Forme of Common Praiers used in the Churches of Geneua … made by Master John Caluyne. … Certayne Graces be added in the ende to the prayse of God, to be sayde before or after meals,' 1550. An imperfect copy of this rare 12mo, printed by E. Whitchurch, is described in Herbert's 'Ames' (p. 547). To the beautiful copy in the Grenville Library in the British Museum is appended a note in Grenville's handwriting, in which he calls attention to its perfect condition, and declares his belief that it is the only copy extant. In his preface Broke says that the graces are his, and that perhaps some will find them over-long; the first is a paraphrase of the Ten Commandments. He also makes another mention of his further translation from Calvin's 'Institution' which he had ready and was about to put forth. If this was ever printed, it appears to have left no sign of its existence. E. Whitchurch had printed the English Liturgy the year before, and this translation of the Genevan form seems to indicate a desire that changes should be made in it so as to bring it nearer to the practices of the Calvinistic congregations abroad.
- 'A Reply to a Libel cast abroad in defence of D. Ed. Boner, by T. Brooke,' no date.
