= John Hegarty (academic) =

Irish physicist and academic

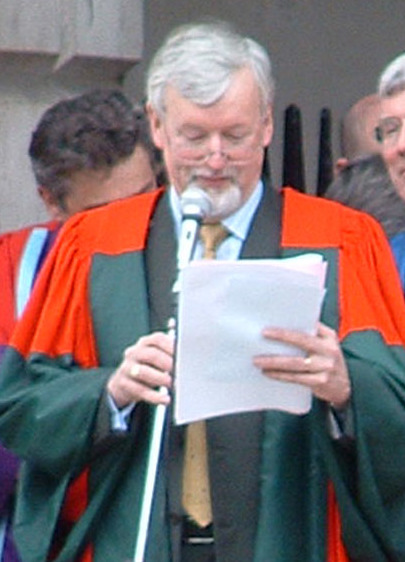
- Provost John Hegarty announcing the new Fellows and Scholars on Trinity Monday 2006 in Trinity College Dublin.

43rd Provost of Trinity College Dublin
- In office 1 August 2001 – 30 July 2011
- Preceded by: Thomas Noel Mitchell
- Succeeded by: Patrick Prendergast

Personal details
- Born: 1948 (age 77–78) Claremorris, County Mayo, Ireland
- Spouse: Neasa Ní Chinnéide (m. 1981)
- Children: 2
- Education: Maynooth University (B.Sc., H.Dip.Ed); University of Galway (Ph.D.)

John Hegarty (born 1948) is an Irish physicist and academic who served as the 43rd Provost of Trinity College Dublin from 2001 to 2011.

== Early life and education ==
He was born in Claremorris, County Mayo, and was educated locally at St Colman's College. He holds a BSc in Physics/Chemistry/Mathematics/Philosophy from St Patrick's College, Maynooth, a HDipEd also from Maynooth and a PhD from University College Galway.

== Academic career ==
Following a postdoctoral stay at the University of Wisconsin–Madison, he was a research scientist at Bell Labs, New Jersey for six years. He returned to Ireland in 1986 as a professor of Laser Physics at Trinity College. Producing over 140 publications, and developing several patents, he was a co-founder of Optronics Ireland and campus company Eblana Photonics. He is a member of the Royal Irish Academy, the American Physical Society, the Optical Society of America, the Institute of Electronic and Electrical Engineers and Fellow of the Institute of Physics.

Before becoming Provost, Hegarty was Dean of Research and Head of the Physics Department.

== Personal life ==
Hegarty is married to Neasa Ní Chinnéide, President of the European Bureau for Lesser-Used Languages, and they have two children, Cillian and Ciarán.

Academic offices
Preceded by Thomas Mitchell	Provost of Trinity College Dublin; 2001–2011	Succeeded by Patrick Prendergast
