= Richard Baldwin (provost) =

Anglo-Irish academic and provost

19th Provost of Trinity College Dublin
- In office 1 August 1717 – 30 September 1758
- Preceded by: Benjamin Pratt
- Succeeded by: Francis Andrews

Personal details
- Born: 4 November 1672; Lancashire, England
- Died: 30 September 1758 (aged 85); Oxford, England
- Resting place: Trinity College Chapel
- Political party: Whig
- Education: Kilkenny College
- Alma mater: Trinity College, Dublin (B.A., 1689; M.A., 1692)

Richard Baldwin D.D. (4 November 1672 – 30 September 1758) was an Anglo-Irish academic who served as the 19th Provost of Trinity College Dublin from 1717 to 1758.

== Early life ==
The details of Baldwin's early life are not certain. The enrolment book of Trinity College Dublin records that Baldwin was born in c.1668 in Athy, County Kildare, the son of Richard Baldwin, a gentleman. Another theory is that Baldwin was born in Lancashire, England, to a poor family before fleeing to Ireland and being taken into the care of Robert Huntington. It is known that Baldwin attended Kilkenny College where he was a contemporary of Jonathan Swift, alongside whom he would later study at Trinity College.

== Career ==
In 1686, Baldwin obtained a scholarship to Trinity College and he graduated with a B.A. in 1689. That same year, the college was occupied by Jacobites during the Williamite War in Ireland and Baldwin, a staunch Whig, fled to England. He had returned to Dublin by 1691, and attained an M.A. in 1692 and was an elected junior fellow in 1693. In 1697, Baldwin became a senior fellow and he was appointed vice-provost in 1713. He remained a fervent anti-Jacobite and was deeply intolerant of students or scholars who he suspected of Jacobitism. In 1714, he was made Regius Professor of Divinity. He opposed the Harley ministry of 1710 to 1714, which likely contributed to his appointment as provost of Trinity College on 24 June 1717.

As provost, Baldwin was known for his arbitrary and harsh manner, and focussed his work on improving the discipline among both staff and students. He was suspicious of intellectual independence which had the effect stifling scholarly inquiry. This led to opposition from some of his fellows, including Richard Helsham and Patrick Delany, who resented Baldwin's fervent Whiggism and approach to academia. Baldwin would eventually force the resignation of Delany from the university. Baldwin wielded increasing influence over all aspects of Trinity life, including personally approving successful parliamentary candidates for the Dublin University constituency.

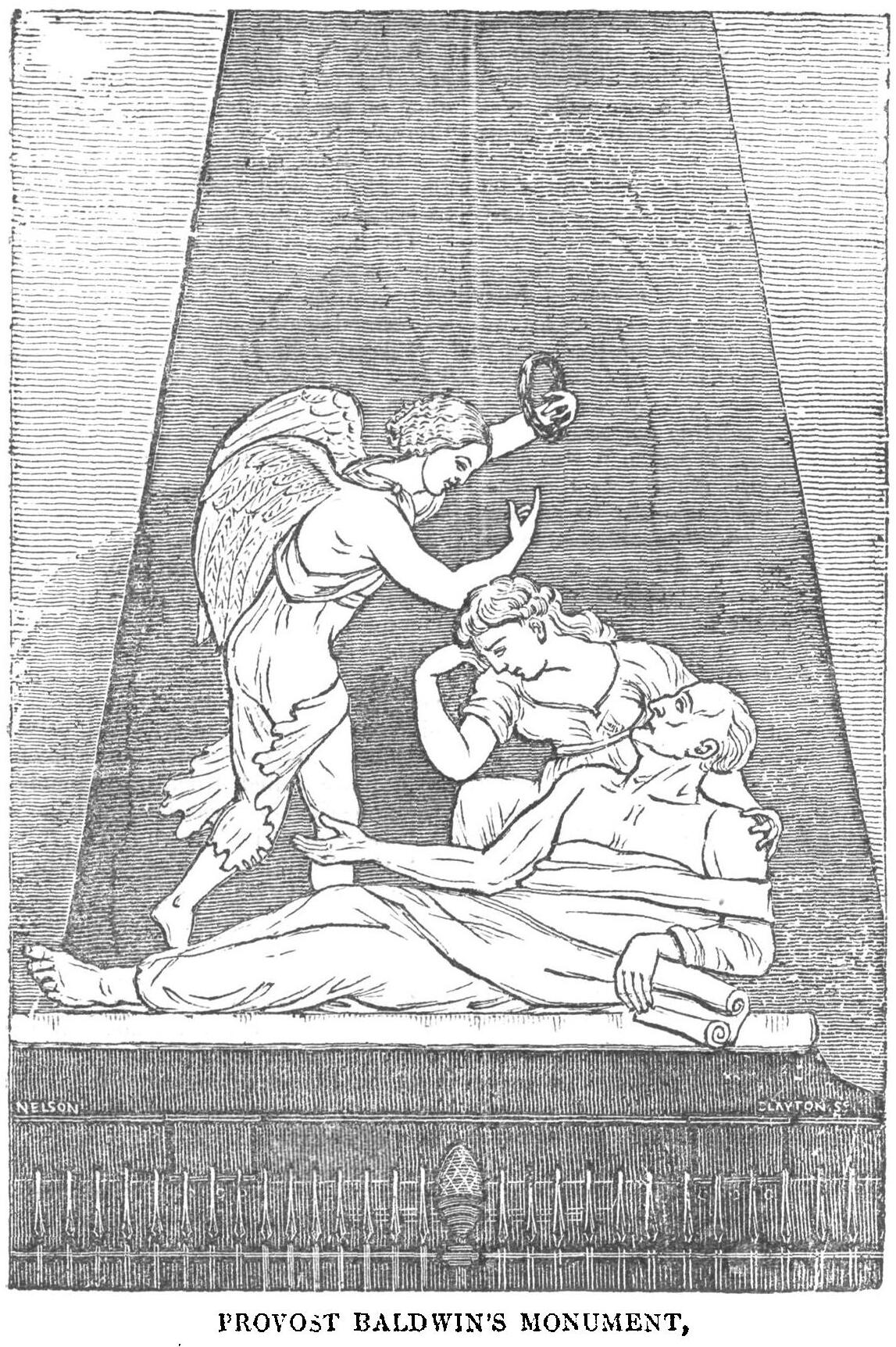
Monument at Trinity College

Baldwin remained provost until his death, in part owing to his political reliability in the opinion of the Dublin Castle administration. By 1753, his control over the university had diminished, reflected by the changing nature of college appointments. He died on 30 September 1758 and was buried in the old chapel in Trinity on 4 October. He left his entire fortune of £24,000 and real estate of 200,000 acres to the college. The will was contested by alleged relatives, but the case was finally decided in favour of Trinity in 1820. Although unmarried, as required by Trinity's statutes, Baldwin lived with a woman in the college until students protested and forced her out. There is a marble monument to his memory in the Examination Hall, sculpted by Christopher Hewetson.

Academic offices
Preceded by Benjamin Pratt	Provost of Trinity College Dublin; 1710–1717	Succeeded by Francis Andrews
