= Thomas Lindsay (bishop) =

English Anglican clergyman

The Most Reverend and Right Honourable Thomas Lindsay PC (Ire), D.D., B.D., M.A
- Archbishop of Armagh; Primate of All Ireland
- Church: Church of Ireland
- Province: Armagh
- Diocese: Armagh
- Appointed: 4 January 1714
- In office: 1714-1724
- Predecessor: Narcissus Marsh
- Successor: Hugh Boulter
- Previous posts: Rector of St Mary Magdalene Woolwich (1686-1694), Dean of St. Patrick's Cathedral, Dublin (1694–1696), Bishop of Killaloe (1696–1713), Bishop of Raphoe (1713–1714)

Orders
- Consecration: 22 March 1696 by Narcissus Marsh

Personal details
- Born: 1656 Blandford, Dorset, England
- Died: 13 July 1724 (aged c. 68) Dublin, Ireland
- Buried: Christ Church Cathedral, Dublin
- Denomination: Anglican

Thomas Lindsay (or Lindesay, Lyndesay), D.D., B.D., M.A (1656–1724) was an Anglican clergyman who served in the Church of Ireland as the Dean of St. Patrick's Cathedral, Dublin, Bishop of Killaloe, Bishop of Raphoe and finally Archbishop of Armagh.

== Biography ==
The son of a Scottish clergyman, he was born in 1656 in Blandford in Dorset, England. He became a Fellow of Wadham College, Oxford, graduating with a Master of Arts in 1678, a Bachelor of Divinity and Doctor of Divinity in 1693. In 1686 he was appointed rector of St Mary Magdalene Woolwich in Kent (now London).

He came to Ireland as chaplain to Henry Capell, 1st Baron Capell of Tewkesbury, the Lord Deputy of Ireland. Soon afterwards he was appointed Dean of St. Patrick's Cathedral, Dublin, by letters patent on 6 February 1694, and installed in the cathedral the next day. Two years later, he was nominated Bishop of Killaloe on 12 February 1696 and consecrated at St. Patrick's Cathedral, Dublin, on 22 March 1696 by Archbishop Narcissus Marsh of Dublin, assisted by Bishop William Moreton of Kildare, and Bishop Nathaniel Foy of Waterford and Lismore. He was translated to the bishopric of Raphoe on 6 June 1713, and a few months later he was promoted to the archbishopric of Armagh on 4 January 1714. He died in Dublin on 13 July 1724, and was buried in Christ Church Cathedral, Dublin.

== Family ==
Thomas was the son of the Rev. John Lindsay, Rector of Blandford. His father was a descendant of the Lindsays of Kinnettles, who descend from the Lindsays of Evelick, who descend from the Lindsays of Lekoquhy, who descend from the third son of Sir David Lindsay, 3rd Earl of Crawford.

Church of Ireland titles
| Preceded by Michael Jephson | Dean of St. Patrick's Cathedral, Dublin; 1694–1696 | Succeeded by Edward Smyth |
| Preceded by Henry Rider | Bishop of Killaloe; 1696–1713 | Succeeded by Thomas Vesey |
| Preceded by John Pooley | Bishop of Raphoe; 1713–1714 | Succeeded by Edward Synge |
| Preceded by Narcissus Marsh | Archbishop of Armagh; 1714–1724 | Succeeded by Hugh Boulter |
