= Francis O'Reilly =

Irish businessman (1922–2013)

Frank O'Reilly
- Born: Francis Joseph Charles O'Reilly; 13 November 1922; Dublin, Ireland
- Died: 11 August 2013 (aged 90); Rathmore, County Kildare
- Education: Trinity College Dublin (BA BAI, 1943)
- Occupation: Businessman
- Spouse: Tess Williams (m. 1950)
- Children: 10

Francis Joseph Charles O'Reilly (13 November 1922 – 11 August 2013) was an Irish businessman, noted for his work in the reviving the Irish distillery industry and modernising Ireland's banking. He served as Chancellor of the University of Dublin from 1985 to 1998.

== Biography ==
O'Reilly was born into an affluent family in Dublin amidst the Irish Civil War, the son of a physician. Descended from John Power of the Powers Gold Label whiskey, he was educated at St Gerard's School, Bray, Ampleforth College in Yorkshire and Trinity College Dublin, earning an engineering degree in 1943.

During the Second World War, O'Reilly served with the British Army's Royal Engineers from 1943 to 1946, part of which he spent with the 7th Indian Infantry Division during the liberation of Burma from Imperial Japanese occupation in 1944–45.

O'Reilly joined Powers in 1946, during a time when there were only four Irish distilleries left: Powers, Cork Distilleries Company, Jameson Irish Whiskey, and Williams of Tullamore. Since the First World War, the Irish whiskey industry was struggling to stay afloat in the small domestic market, as they had been unable to do normal business in the U.S. because of Prohibition in the United States (1920–33) and the Anglo-Irish Trade War.

By the 1960s, O'Reilly was joint managing director of Powers with his cousin John A. Ryan, but whiskey sales were still in decline. O'Reilly realised the industry needed to be radically reorganised. Powers, which had acquired Tullamore in the 1950s, merged with rivals Cork and Jameson to form Irish Distillers, Ltd. (IDL) in 1966, with O'Reilly serving as its first chairman. O'Reilly was credited with several key decisions that made a lasting contribution to Ireland's economy. In particular, O'Reilly was instrumental in selling IDL to the French company Pernod Ricard in 1988, avoiding a hostile takeover by the UK's Grand Metropolitan group.

== Other activity ==
O'Reilly was president of the Royal Dublin Society (1986–89) and served as the 23rd Chancellor of the University of Dublin (1985–98). He was also a director of Ulster and National Westminster Banks.

== Equestrian sport ==
O'Reilly was very involved in equestrian sport, and was a member of the National Hunt Steeplechasing Committee, president of the Equestrian Federation of Ireland, chairman of Punchestown Racecourse and of the Kildare Hunt, and steward and trustee of the Turf Club.

O'Reilly was instrumental in Dublin being selected as the site of the 10th Show Jumping World Championships in 1982. These world championships were the first to include a compulsory horse inspection prior to the event.

== Honours ==
O'Reilly was conferred an honorary degree of doctor of laws by Dublin University (1978) and the National University of Ireland (1986). He was also an honorary fellow of his alma mater, Trinity College Dublin.

In 2002, O'Reilly was invested as a Knight Commander of the Equestrian Order of St Gregory the Great by Pope John Paul II in recognition of his outstanding contribution to the restoration of the Irish College in Paris.

== Personal life ==
In 1950, O'Reilly married Teresa "Tess" Williams, of the Tullamore distilling family. They had ten children: Mary, Charles, Jane, Olivia, Margaret, Rose, Louise, Peter, Paul and Julie.

He died at Rathmore, County Kildare at age 91, survived by his wife and ten children, and several grandchildren and great-grandchildren.

Academic offices
Preceded by William Bedell Stanford	Chancellor of the University of Dublin; 1985–1998	Succeeded by Mary Robinson
