= Richard Washington (provost) =

English academic and provost

8th Provost of Trinity College Dublin
- In office 1 August 1640 – 30 October 1641
- Preceded by: William Chappell
- Succeeded by: Anthony Martin

Personal details
- Born: 19 November 1594 London, England
- Died: 4 September 1666 (aged 71) Oxford, England
- Education: University College, Oxford

Richard Washington (19 November 1592 – 4 September 1666) was an English academic who served as the 8th Provost of Trinity College Dublin from 1640 to 1641.

A Fellow of University College, Oxford, Richard Washington was appointed Provost of Trinity College, Dublin, in August 1640, but his tenure was brief. He took up office on the eve of a major shift in political power that resulted in the downfall and execution of the Lord Deputy, Thomas Wentworth, the following May. In England, tension between the Crown and Parliament grew towards breaking point; in Ireland a resurgent House of Commons began to reassert its authority over the College. The House’s main objective was to halt and reverse the anglicisation of the College that had been steadily pursued during Chappell’s provostship. During previous years fellowship elections had been manipulated in the English interest and by now all Fellows except Thomas Seele (later to become Provost) were English by birth. The Irish rebellion broke out in Ulster on the night of 22 October 1641 and a week later Provost Washington and most of the Fellows fled to England.

Academic offices
Preceded by William Chappell	Provost of Trinity College Dublin; 1640–1641	Succeeded by Anthony Martin
