= Peter Browne (theologian) =

Irish Anglican priest

The Right Reverend Peter Browne
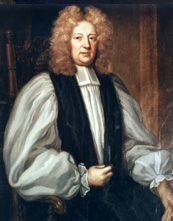
- Provost Peter Browne, by Hugh Howard.

17th Provost of Trinity College Dublin
- In office 14 February 1699 – 30 July 1710
- Preceded by: George Browne
- Succeeded by: Benjamin Pratt

Personal details
- Born: 23 December 1665 Dublin, Ireland
- Died: 27 August 1735 (aged 69) Mayfair, London, England
- Education: Trinity College Dublin

Peter Browne (23 December 1665 – 27 August 1735) was an Irish Anglican priest who served as the 17th Provost of Trinity College Dublin from 1699 to 1710. He was also Bishop of Cork and Ross.

== Life ==
Born in Dublin in 1665, Browne entered Trinity College Dublin, in 1682, and after ten years' residence obtained a fellowship. In 1699, he was made Provost, and in the same year published his Letter in answer to a Book entitled "Christianity not Mysterious," which was recognized as the ablest reply yet written to Toland. It expounds in germ the whole of his later theory of analogy. Browne was a man of abstemious habits, charitable disposition, and impressive eloquence. In 1710, he was made bishop of Cork and Ross, which post he held till his death in 1735.

== Works ==
In 1713, Browne became known for his vigorous pamphleteering attack on the fashion of drinking healths, especially "to the glorious and immortal memory." His two most important works are the Procedure, Extent, and Limits of the Human Understanding (1728), an able though sometimes captious critique of Locke's essay, and Things Divine and Supernatural conceived by Analogy with Things Natural and Human, more briefly referred to as the Divine Analogy (1733).

The doctrine of analogy was intended as a reply to the deistical conclusions that had been drawn from Locke's theory of knowledge. Browne holds that not only God's essence, but his attributes are inexpressible by our ideas, and can only be conceived analogically. This view was vigorously assailed as leading to atheism by Berkeley in his Alciphron (Dialogue iv.), and a great part of the Divine Analogy is occupied with a defence against that criticism. The bishop emphasizes the distinction between metaphor and analogy; though the conceived attributes are not thought. as they are in themselves, yet there is a reality corresponding in some way to our ideas of them.

His analogical arguments resemble those found in the Bampton Lectures of Dean Mansel.

== Sources ==
Academic offices
Preceded by George Browne	Provost of Trinity College Dublin; 1699–1710	Succeeded by Benjamin Pratt
Church of Ireland titles
Preceded by Dive Downes	Bishop of Cork and Ross; 1710–1735	Succeeded by Robert Clayton
