= George Browne (provost) =

English academic and provost

The Reverend George Browne

16th Provost of Trinity College Dublin
- In office 1 August 1695 – 5 February 1699
- Preceded by: St George Ashe
- Succeeded by: Peter Browne

Personal details
- Born: 6 January 1649 Northumberland, England
- Died: 5 February 1699 (aged 50) Dublin, Ireland
- Education: Trinity College Dublin (B.A., 1671; D.D., 1675)

George Browne, D.D. (6 January 1649 – 5 February 1699) was an English 17th-century academic who served as the 16th Provost of Trinity College Dublin from 1695 to 1699.

Brown was born in Northumberland in 1649. He entered Trinity College Dublin in 1667 and graduated B.A. in 1671. He became a Fellow in 1673. He became professor of laws in 1886 and professor of divinity in 1693. Browne was Provost from 1695 to 1699.

Academic offices
Preceded by St George Ashe	Provost of Trinity College Dublin; 1695–1699	Succeeded by Peter Browne
