= William Smith (Archdeacon of Armagh) =

English priest in Ireland

William Smith (died 1673) was Archdeacon of Armagh from 1669 until his death in 1673.

Smith was born at Cowling, Craven, educated at St John's College, Cambridge and ordained on 30 October 1661. He held livings at Tydavnet, Kilmore and Drumsnat. He was buried at Church of St. Nicholas Within, Dublin on 11 February 1673.
