= F. S. L. Lyons =

Irish historian and provost of Trinity College Dublin

40th Provost of Trinity College Dublin
- In office 1 August 1974 – 1 August 1981
- Preceded by: Albert Joseph McConnell
- Succeeded by: William Arthur Watts

Personal details
- Born: Francis Stewart Leland Lyons; 11 November 1923 Derry, Northern Ireland
- Died: 21 September 1983 (aged 59) Dublin, Ireland
- Resting place: Trinity College Chapel
- Spouse: Jennifer Ann Stuart McAlister (m. 1954)
- Children: 2
- Education: Dover College, Kent; The High School, Dublin
- Alma mater: Trinity College Dublin

Francis Stewart Leland Lyons (11 November 1923 – 21 September 1983) was an Irish historian and academic who served as the 40th Provost of Trinity College Dublin from 1974 to 1981.

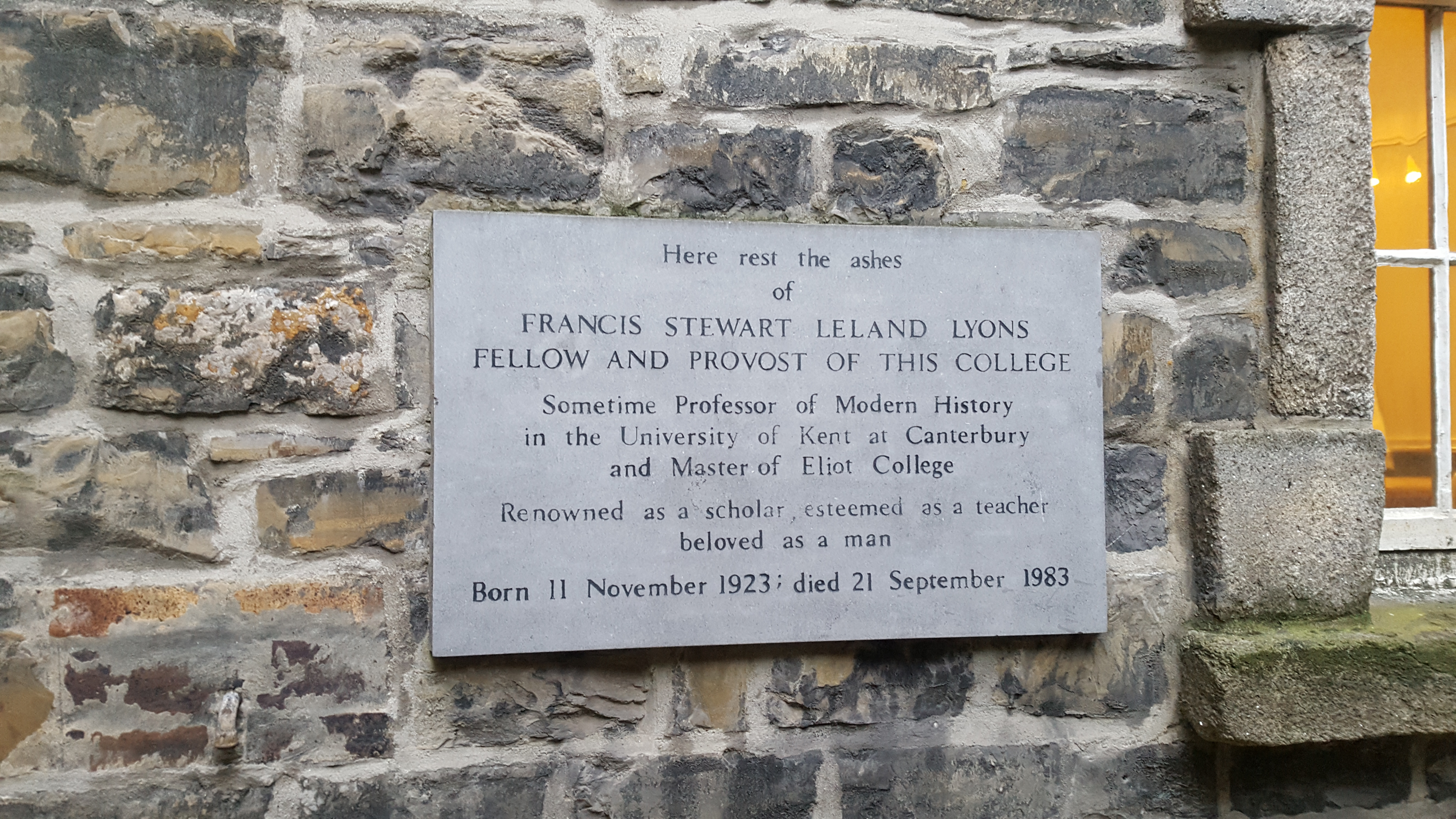
Plaque marking Lyons' burial site at Trinity College Dublin

== Biography ==
Leland Lyons was born in Derry, Northern Ireland, in 1923, the son of Northern Bank official Stewart Lyons and Florence May, née Leland. He was known as Le among his friends and family. His family were Irish Protestant, of Presbyterian and Church of Ireland background, and resided at Old Park, Belfast. After his birth, his family soon moved to Boyle, County Roscommon, Ireland. He was educated at Dover College in Kent and later attended The High School, Dublin. At Trinity College Dublin, he was elected a Scholar in Modern History and Political Science in 1943.

He was a lecturer in history at the University of Hull and then at Trinity College Dublin. He became the founding Professor of Modern History at the University of Kent in 1964, serving also as Master of Eliot College from 1969 to 1972.

Lyons became Provost of Trinity College Dublin in 1974, but, relinquished the post in 1981 to concentrate on writing. He won the Heinemann Prize in 1978 for his work in Charles Stewart Parnell. He wrote Culture and Anarchy in Ireland, 1890–1939 which won the Christopher Ewart-Biggs Memorial Prize and the Wolfson Literary Prize for History in 1979. Lyons was also awarded honorary doctorates by five universities and had fellowships at the Royal Society of Literature and the British Academy. He was Visiting Professor at Princeton University.

His principal works include Ireland Since the Famine, the standard university textbook for Irish history from the mid-19th to late-20th century, which The Times called "the definitive work of modern Irish history" and a biography of Charles Stewart Parnell.

Lyons was critical of Cecil Woodham-Smith's much-acclaimed history of the Great Irish Famine and has generally been considered among the "revisionist" historians who reconsidered the role of the British state in events like the Famine.

Lyons married his wife Jennifer Ann Stuart McAlister in 1954, and had two sons, one of whom, Nicholas, is a former Lord Mayor of London. Following a short illness, Lyons died in Dublin in 1983, just shy of his 60th birthday.

== Bibliography ==
- Lyons, F. S. L. (1951). The Irish Parliamentary Party, 1890–1910.
- — (1960). The fall of Parnell, 1890–91. London: Routledge and Kegan Paul.
- Internationalism in Europe 1815–1914 (1963)
- John Dillon: A Biography (1968)
- Ireland Since the Famine (1971)
- Charles Stewart Parnell (1977)
- Culture and Anarchy in Ireland, 1890–1939 (1979) – won the Christopher Ewart-Biggs Memorial Prize

Academic offices
| Preceded by Albert Joseph McConnell | Provost of Trinity College Dublin; 1974–1981 | Succeeded by William Arthur Watts |
