= St George Ashe =

Irish mathematician, university administrator, and Church of Ireland bishop

The Right Reverend St. George Ashe
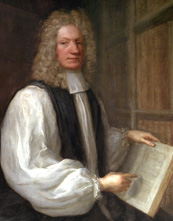
- Provost St George Ashe, by Hugh Howard.

15th Provost of Trinity College Dublin
- In office 1 August 1692 – 30 July 1695
- Preceded by: Robert Huntington
- Succeeded by: George Browne

Personal details
- Born: 3 March 1657 Roscommon, Ireland
- Died: 27 February 1718 (aged 60) Dublin, Ireland
- Resting place: Christ Church Cathedral
- Spouse: Jane St George (m. 1684)
- Children: 2
- Education: Trinity College, Dublin (B.A., 1676; D.D., 1681)

St. George Ashe, D.D. (3 March 1657 – 27 February 1718) was an Irish mathematician who served as the 15th Provost of Trinity College Dublin from 1692 to 1695. In the late 17th and early 18th centuries, he served as Church of Ireland Bishop of Cloyne, Clogher and Derry, in succession. From 1685 to 1692, he was the Donegall Lecturer in Mathematics at Trinity College Dublin. He is remembered now chiefly for his alleged role in performing a secret marriage between Jonathan Swift and Esther Johnson (Stella).

== Early life and education ==
Ashe was born in Roscommon in 1658, a younger son of Thomas Ashe and his wife Mary St George, daughter of Richard St George of Athlone. Dillon Ashe, Archdeacon of Clogher, was his brother. He was educated at Trinity College, where he earned his B.A. (1676),

== Academic career ==
He became a Fellow of Trinity College in 1679, then Professor of Mathematics in 1685, and ultimately became Provost in 1692, a position he served in until July 1695. He later returned to Trinity College as Vice-Chancellor in 1702. He afterwards acted as secretary and chaplain to the British Embassy at Vienna. Returning to Ireland in 1692, he was made Provost of Trinity College.

== Bishop ==
He was consecrated Bishop of Cloyne in 1695, and promoted to the see of Clogher in 1697, and to that of Derry in 1717. He spent a large sum on refurbishing the episcopal palace at Clogher. He refused to become Archbishop of Tuam in 1716 because the stipend was inadequate. He had a reputation for being an absentee bishop. He was sharply reprimanded on that account by William King, Archbishop of Dublin, who wrote that the enemies of the church were led by his conduct to conclude that "bishops are not necessary, since they can so long be spared", and pleaded with him to "think of coming home as soon as possible".

He occasionally contributed to the Proceedings of the Royal Society, of which he was a member. He died in Dublin, on 27 February 1718, and was buried in Christ Church. He bequeathed his mathematical library to the College.

== Family ==
Two years before he died, Ashe sent his son, also called St George Ashe, on a Grand Tour with the philosopher George Berkeley, a Fellow of Trinity College, as his tutor. Having been conducted on one of the most extensive tours of the period, including the length and breadth of Italy, including Sicily, Ischia, Calabria, and Apulia, the young Ashe died, presumably without having seen his father again, in Brussels in 1721. By his wife (and distant cousin) Jane St George, daughter of Sir George St George of Dunmore, County Galway and Elizabeth Hannay, the Bishop as well as his son had one daughter Elizabeth, who married as his second wife Sir Ralph Gore, 4th Baronet, and had numerous children, including Ralph Gore, 1st Earl of Ross.

== Character ==
Despite his record as an absentee bishop, Ashe was much loved by his friends. Joseph Addison wrote to Swift to commiserate him on Ashe's death, and said that Ashe was a man "who has scarce left behind his equal in humanity, agreeable conversation and all kinds of learning".

== Swift and Stella ==
Bishop Ashe was a lifelong friend of Jonathan Swift, whose tutor he had been at Trinity College. In 1726, Esther Johnson ("Stella") the lifelong companion of Swift, is said to have confided to her friends that Ashe had performed a secret marriage ceremony, with no witnesses, between herself and Swift in 1716. Whether or not her claim was true has been the subject of endless debate. Their friends were deeply divided on the truth of the story, and historians conclude that it is impossible to be certain one way or the other, since Ashe, the only person other than Swift and Stella who could have known the truth, was already dead when Stella reportedly made her disclosure.

Academic offices
Preceded by Robert Huntington	Provost of TCD; 1692–1695	Succeeded by George Browne
