= Michael Moore (provost) =

Irish priest, philosopher, and educationalist

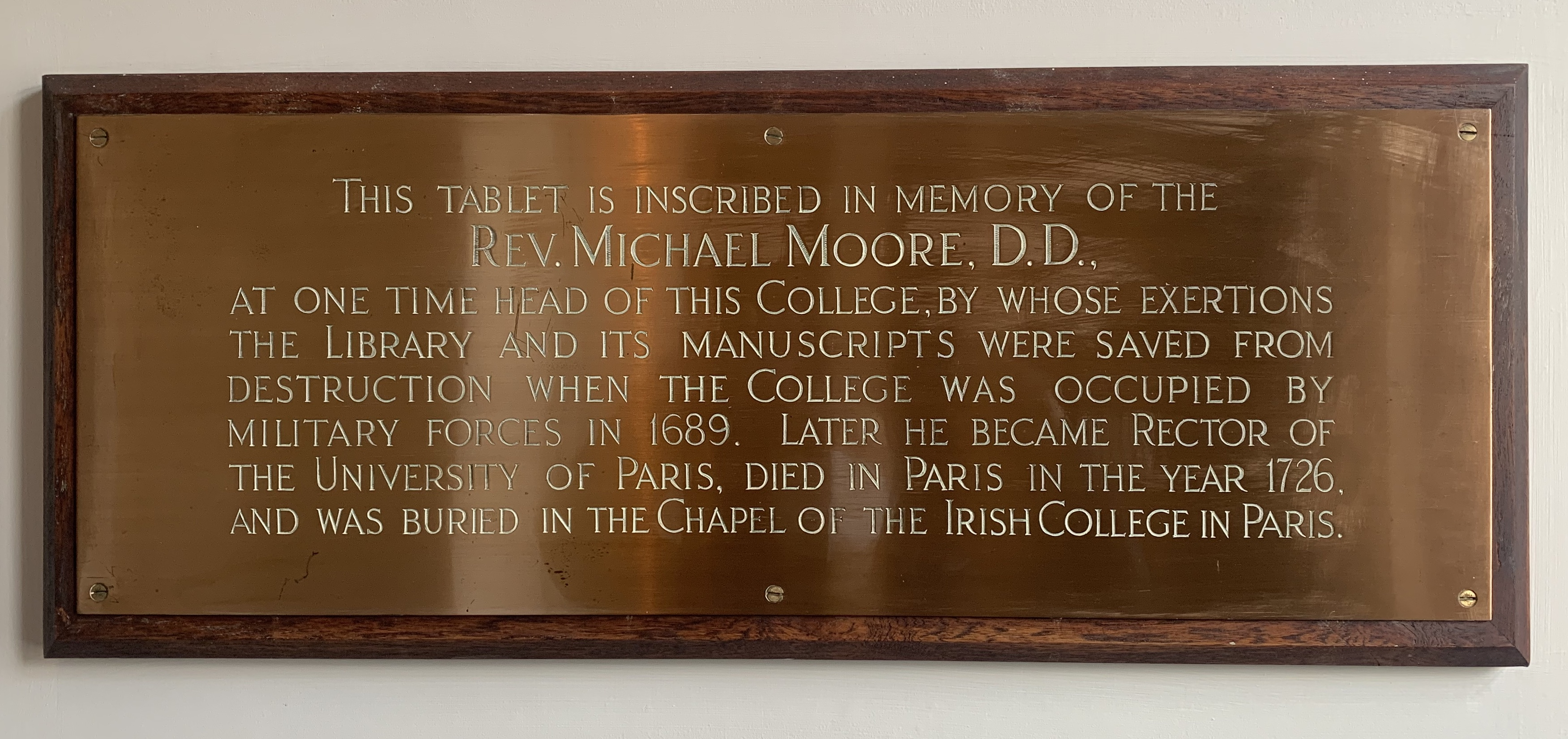
A plaque in memory of Michael Moore in the 1937 Reading Room in Trinity College Dublin

Michael Moore (Irish: Micheál Ó Mordha) (c.1639–1726) was an Irish priest, philosopher, and educationalist.

== Early life ==
Moore – generally referred to as Moore or Moor in contemporary documents – was born in Dublin about 1639. He left Ireland at a young age to be educated in Nantes and Paris, where he taught philosophy and rhetoric at the Collège des Grassins. He was proposed for the position of rector at the University of Paris in June 1677 by a faction who wished to replace the then rector, Nicholas Pieres, but felt compelled to decline the offer.

Returning to Ireland in the early 1680s, he was ordained in 1684. Archbishop of Dublin, Patrick Russell appointed him vicar-general of the Diocese of Dublin.

== Provost of Trinity College ==
Upon the flight of provost Robert Huntington of Trinity College, Dublin, in 1689, Moore became the college's first Catholic provost. He acquired the post via the influence of Richard Talbot, Earl of Tyrconnell, to whom he was chaplain and confessor. The Catholic Encyclopedia states "The college was seized by the Jacobites, the chapel was made a powder magazine, one portion of the building was turned into a barrack, and another into a gaol for persons suspected of disaffection to the royal cause. .. He {Moore} upheld the rights of the college, secured it from further pillage, and endeavoured to mitigate the treatment of the prisoners. With the librarian, Father McCarthy, he prevented the soldiery from burning the library, and by preserving its precious collections rendered an incalculable service to letters."

However, a sermon which Moore delivered in Christ Church Cathedral concerning King James's ecclesiastical policies so offended the king that he was obliged to resign the post in 1690; after this, he returned to Paris. He moved to Rome in 1691 when King James arrived in Paris, after fleeing Dublin in the wake of the Jacobite defeat at the Battle of the Boyne.

== In Rome ==
While in Rome, Moore became Censor of Books. He came to the attention and favour of the successive Popes, Innocent XII (1691–1700) and Clement XI (1700–1721). When Cardinal Barbarigo established his college at Montefiascone, he appointed Ó Mordha as rector and professor of philosophy and Greek. The college attracted men of learning, and received from Innocent XII an annual grant of two thousand crowns.

== Rector of the University of Paris ==
After the death of James II in 1701, Moore returned to France, where – through Cardinal de Noailles – he was appointed Rector of the University of Paris. He remains the only Irishman to hold the post, serving from 10 October 1701 to 9 October 1702. He was also made principal of the Collège de Navarre, and professor of philosophy, Greek, and Hebrew in the Collège de France.

== Final years ==
In 1702 he delivered the annual panegyric on Louis XIV. Moore joined Dr. Farrelly (Fealy) in purchasing a house near the Irish College for poor Irish students. Blind for some years he had to employ an amanuensis, who took advantage of his master's affliction to steal and sell many hundred volumes of his choice library. What remained, Moore bequeathed to the Irish College.

He died in the Collège de Navarre, and was buried in the vault under the chapel of the Irish College.

== Bibliography ==
- De Existentia Dei, et Humanae Mentis Immortalitate, secundum Cartesii et Aristotelis Doctrinam, Paris, 1692.
- Hortatio ad Studium Linguae Graecae et Hebraicae, Montefiascone, 1700.
- Vera Sciendi Methodus, Paris, 1716.

Academic offices
| Preceded by Robert Huntington | Provost of Trinity College Dublin; 1689–1690 | Succeeded by Robert Huntington |
