= Archdeacon of Clonmacnoise =

The Archdeacon of Clonmacnoise was a senior ecclesiastical officer within the Church in Ireland. As such he was responsible for the disciplinary supervision of clergy within the Meath Diocese. The archdeaconry can trace its history from Milo Mac Thady O'Connor, the first known incumbent, who held the office in 1260, to the last incumbent Richard Lingard who held the office from 1639 to 1666 when he became Dean of Lismore.
