= Calais (Parliament of England constituency) =

Former constituency of the Parliament of England

- Former borough constituency for the House of Commons
- Major settlements: Calais

1536–1558
- Seats: 2
- Replaced by: Constituency abolished (annexed by France)

Calais (dated, Cales /ˈkæləs/) was a former constituency of the Parliament of England.

The Flemish town of Calais was under the English rule from 1347 – 7 January 1558. During part of that time it was represented in the Parliament of England by two members.

In 1360, the Treaty of Brétigny assigned Guînes, Marck and Calais – collectively the "Pale of Cales" – to English rule in perpetuity, but in a daring raid during the rule of Mary I, was retaken by France. In 1363 the town was made a staple port.

== Reforms in the representation of the town ==
King Henry VIII of England decided to modify the arrangements for the government of Calais. A statute (27 Hen. 8. c. 63) made provision for two members to be returned to the Parliament of England. One member was to be nominated, elected and chosen by the Deputy (the king's representative in the town) and his council. The other member was to be nominated, elected and chosen by the mayor and his council.

Under the provisions of the statute, members were elected to ten parliaments. On 6 December 1557, a writ was issued for the election of members to an eleventh parliament, but before it met Calais had fallen to the French.

== Members of Parliament 1536-1558 ==
Summoned	Elected	Assembled	Dissolved	First Member	Second Member
27 April 1536	1536	8 June 1536	18 July 1536	Thomas Boys	William Pryseley
1 March 1539	1539	28 April 1539	24 July 1540	Thomas Boys	Thomas Broke
23 November 1541	1542	16 January 1542	28 March 1544	unknown	unknown
1 December 1544	1545	23 November 1545	31 January 1547	Richard Blount	Eustace Abington
2 August 1547	1547	4 November 1547	15 April 1552	Thomas Broke	Thomas Fowler
5 January 1553	1553	1 March 1553	31 March 1553	unknown	Thomas Massingberd
14 August 1553	1553	5 October 1553	5 December 1553	Edmund Peyton	John Aster
17 February 1554	1554	2 April 1554	3 May 1554	William Horne	John Aster
3 October 1554	1554	12 November 1554	16 January 1555	Oliver Loveband	Hugh Counsell
3 September 1555	1555	21 October 1555	9 December 1555	John Challoner (Note: It is not certain that Challoner was the member, but it was inferred that he was.)	Edmund Peyton
6 December 1557	n/a	20 January 1558	17 November 1558	vacant	vacant
