= Thomas Seele =

Irish Anglican cleric

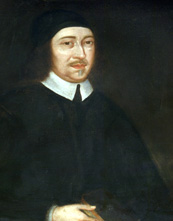

11th Provost of Trinity College Dublin
- In office 1 August 1661 – 15 January 1675
- Preceded by: Samuel Winter
- Succeeded by: Michael Ward

Personal details
- Born: 9 September 1611 Dublin, Ireland
- Died: 15 January 1675 (aged 63) Oxford, England
- Education: Trinity College, Dublin (B.A., 1629; M.A., 1633)

Thomas Seele (9 September 1611 – 15 January 1675) was an Irish Anglican who served as the 11th Provost of Trinity College Dublin from 1661 to 1675. He was also Dean of St Patrick's Cathedral.

Educated at Trinity College Dublin, graduating with a B.A. (1629), and M.A. (1633). He was elected a Fellow of Trinity College (1634), then restored to his Fellowship in 1637, and was made a Senior Fellow (1638) and later a B.D. He served as Rector of Coolock and Raheny, in North Dublin. He served as Vice-Provost of Trinity College from 1641 to 1644.

He was banned from preaching by Henry Cromwell in 1658. He was appointed to the provostship of Trinity College by King Charles II in 1661, despite being married, which was previously a barrier to holding the position. In the same year, he was made Dean of St. Patrick's. He died in 1675.

Academic offices
Preceded by Samuel Winter	Provost of Trinity College Dublin; 1652–1660	Succeeded by Michael Ward
