= Robert Huntington =

English churchman, orientalist and manuscript collector

The Right Reverend Robert Huntington

14th Provost of Trinity College Dublin
- In office 1 August 1679 – 30 July 1683
- Preceded by: Narcissus Marsh
- Succeeded by: St George Ashe

Personal details
- Born: 12 February 1637 Deerhurst, Gloucestershire, England
- Died: 2 September 1701 (aged 64) Dublin, Ireland
- Resting place: Trinity College Chapel
- Education: Bristol Grammar School
- Alma mater: Merton College, Oxford (B.A., 1658; M.A., 1662)

Robert Huntington (12 February 1637 – 2 September 1701) was an English churchman, orientalist, and manuscript collector who served as the 14th Provost of Trinity College Dublin from 1679 to 1683. He was later Bishop of Raphoe.

== Early life and education ==
He was the second son of the Rev. Robert Huntington, curate of Deerhurst in Gloucestershire, born in February 1637. His father was vicar of the adjoining parish of Leigh from 1648 until he died in 1664. Robert was educated at Bristol Grammar School, and in 1652 was admitted portionist at Merton College, Oxford, graduating B.A. on 9 March 1658, and M.A. on 21 Jan. 1662–3. As soon as the statutes of the college would allow, he was elected to a fellowship; he signed the decree of 1660, condemning all the proceedings of convocation under the commonwealth, and his possession of its emoluments was undisturbed.

At Oxford, he applied himself to the study of oriental languages, and on the return of Robert Frampton he applied for his post of chaplain to the Levant Company at Aleppo and was elected on 1 August 1670. In the following month, he sailed and arrived there in January 1671. Huntington remained in the Eastern Mediterranean for more than ten years, paying visits to Palestine, Cyprus, and Egypt, and acquiring rare manuscripts. His chief correspondents in England were Narcissus Marsh, John Fell, Edward Pocock, and Edward Bernard, and he made many purchases for Marsh and Fell. With the Samaritans of Nablus he began in 1671 a correspondence which was kept up between English and Samaritan scholars for many years. Henry Teonge visited Aleppo in 1676 and recorded Huntington's life there in his diary.

== Career ==
On 14 July 1681, he resigned his chaplaincy, returning through Italy and France, and settling once more at Merton College. He took the degrees of B.D. and D.D. (15 June 1683). Humphry Prideaux, himself eager for the Hebrew professorship, mentions Huntington as a probable competitor. Through the recommendation of Fell to Marsh he was offered the provostship of Trinity College Dublin (1683) and accepted it. An Irish translation of the New Testament had already been printed, but Marsh and Huntington superintended a translation into the same language of the canonical books of the Old Testament, which was printed at the expense of Robert Boyle. In 1688, he fled from Ireland but returned for a short time after the battle of the Boyne. During this time Michael Moore was appointed as head of the college.

The bishopric of Kilmore, which was vacant through the refusal of William Sheridan to take the oaths of allegiance to the new ministry, was offered to him early in 1692 but declined, and as he preferred to live in England, he resigned his provostship of Trinity College (September 1692). In the same autumn (19 August 1692) Huntington was instituted, on the presentation of Sir Edward Turner, to the rectory of Great Hallingbury in Essex. He failed in October 1693 to obtain the wardenship of Merton College, and about the end of 1692, he married a daughter of John Powell and a sister of Sir John Powell. He was consecrated bishop of Raphoe on 20 July 1701 at Dublin. Almost immediately afterward he fell ill, and he died in Dublin on 2 September 1701, when he was buried near the door of Trinity College Chapel, and a marble monument was erected by the widow to his memory.

== Works and legacy ==
Huntington's sole publication was a short paper in Philosophical Transactions' No. 161 (20 July 1684). Edward Bernard inscribed to him his paper on the chief fixed stars. Huntington gave to Merton College 14 oriental manuscripts and to the Bodleian Library 35 more. A much larger number, 646 in all, was purchased from him in 1693 for the Bodleian for £700. Thomas Marshall, Rector of Lincoln College, Oxford, and Dean of Gloucester, gave to the Bodleian in 1685 many manuscripts, including some Coptic copies of the gospels procured for him by Huntington, and Archbishop Marsh on his death in 1713 left to the same library many oriental manuscripts which he had acquired from Huntington. These manuscripts are described in Bernard's Catalogue (1697), and the official catalogues of the Bodleian (1788–1835 and 1848–90). Huntington was also a liberal contributor of manuscripts to Trinity College, Dublin.

== See also ==
- Minuscule 67
- Minuscule 325

== Sources ==
This article incorporates text from a publication now in the public domain: "Huntington, Robert". Dictionary of National Biography. London: Smith, Elder & Co. 1885–1900.

Academic offices
Preceded by Narcissus Marsh; Michael Moore	Provost of Trinity College Dublin; 1683–1692	Succeeded by St George Ashe; Michael Moore
Church of Ireland titles
Preceded by Alexander Cairncross	Bishop of Raphoe; 1701	Succeeded by John Pooley
