= William Temple (logician) =

English logician and Provost of Trinity College Dublin

4th Provost of Trinity College Dublin
- In office 1 August 1609 – 15 January 1627
- Preceded by: Henry Alvey
- Succeeded by: William Bedell

Member of Parliament for Dublin University
- In office 9 May 1613 – 15 January 1627
- Preceded by: New office
- Succeeded by: William Bedell

Personal details
- Born: 9 June 1555 Leicester, England
- Died: 15 January 1627 (aged 71) Dublin, Ireland
- Resting place: Trinity College Chapel
- Spouse(s): Martha Harrison (m. 1573; d. 1627)
- Children: 5, including John
- Education: Eton College
- Alma mater: King's College, Cambridge (B.A., 1578; M.A., 1581)

Sir William Temple (9 June 1555 – 15 January 1627) was an English Ramist logician who served as the 4th Provost of Trinity College Dublin from 1609 to 1627. He also served as a member of the Irish House of Commons representing the Dublin University constituency from 1613 to 1627.

== Early life ==
William Temple was born in Leicester in 1555. He was the son of Leicestershire man Anthony Temple, whose family name was said to descend from the Knight Templars, a once powerful monastic order during the Crusades, but which was outlawed by Pope Clement V. The rituals and the secrets of the order survived and many of the Knight Templars families came to prominence in 16th-century England when Protestantism was embraced. He was educated at Eton College and passed with a scholarship to King's College, Cambridge, in 1573. In 1576, he was elected a Fellow of King's College and graduated with a B.A. in 1577–8 and M.A. in philosophy in 1581.

== Career ==
He became Master of Lincoln Grammar School that same year. Though originally destined for the law, he became a tutor in logic at his college. "In his logic readings," wrote a pupil, Anthony Wotton, in his Runne from Rome (1624), "he always laboured to fit his pupils for the true use of that art rather than for vain and idle speculations." He accepted with enthusiasm the logical methods and views of Petrus Ramus and became the most active champion of the Ramists in England.

=== Arrival in Ireland ===
William Temple's first sight of Ireland came as he landed at Howth, north of Dublin, in April 1599 to take up his position as secretary to the new lord lieutenant, Robert Devereux, and 2nd Earl of Essex. It was a baptism of fire as their first great task was to suppress a major rebellion of the native Irish tribes who had now united with the Anglo-Normans. While Essex campaigned around the country, Temple stayed behind in Dublin that summer relaying news of military deployment and successes to the Royal Court, Essex, once Queen Elizabeth's most trusted confidant and intimate advisor, now became the unappreciated and maligned viceroy falling foul of the ageing queen. Both he and William Temple were ignominiously recalled to London that same autumn.

=== Ramist controversies ===
In 1580, he replied in print to an attack on Ramus's position by Everard Digby. Adopting the pseudonym "Franciscus Mildapettus of Navarre" (Ramus had studied in youth at the Parisian Collège de Navarre), he issued a tract against Digby. The work was dedicated to Philip Howard, 1st Earl of Arundel, whose acquaintance Temple had made while the earl was studying at Cambridge. Digby replied with great heat next year, and Temple retorted with a volume published under his name. This he again dedicated to his patron the Earl of Arundel, and he announced his identity with Mildapettus. He appended to the volume an elaborate epistle addressed to another Ramist, Johannes Piscator of Strasburg, professor at Herborn Academy.

Temple's contributions to the controversy attracted notice abroad, and this volume was reissued at Frankfort in 1584. Meanwhile, in 1582, Temple had concentrated his efforts on Piscator's writings, and he published in 1582 a second letter to Piscator with the latter's full reply.

In 1581, Temple had supplicated for incorporation as M.A. at Oxford, and soon afterward he left Cambridge to take up the office of master of the Lincoln grammar school. In 1584, he published an annotated edition of Ramus's Dialectics. It was published at Cambridge and is said to have been the first book issued by the university press. A further reply to Piscator was appended. The dedication was to Sir Philip Sidney. In the same year, Temple contributed a long preface, in which he renewed with spirit the war on Aristotle, to the Disputatio de prima simplicium et concretorum corporum generatione, by a fellow Ramist, James Martin of Dunkeld, professor of philosophy at Turin. This also came from Thomas's press at Cambridge: it was republished at Frankfort in 1589. In the same place there was issued in 1591 a severe criticism of both Martin's argument and Temple's preface by an Aristotelian, Andreas Libavius, in his Quaestionum Physicarum controversarum inter Peripateticos et Rameos Tractatus (Frankfort, 1591).

=== Secretary ===
Temple's writings attracted the attention of Sir Philip Sidney, to whom the edition of Ramus's Dialectics was dedicated in 1584, and Sidney invited Temple to become his secretary in November 1585, when he was appointed governor of Flushing. He was with Sidney during his fatal illness in the autumn of the following year, and his master died in his arms (17 October 1586). Sidney left him by will an annuity of £30.

Temple's services were next sought successively by William Davison, the queen's secretary, and Sir Thomas Smith, clerk of the privy council. But about 1594, he joined the household of Robert Devereux, 2nd Earl of Essex, and for many years performed secretarial duties for the earl in conjunction with Anthony Bacon, Henry Cuff, and Sir Henry Wotton. In 1597 he was, by Essex's influence, returned to parliament as a member for Tamworth in Staffordshire.

He seems to have accompanied Essex to Ireland in 1599 and to have returned with him next year. When Essex was engaged in organising his rebellion in London in the winter of 1600–1, Temple was still in his service, but he protested in a letter to Sir Robert Cecil, written after Essex's arrest, that he was kept in complete ignorance of the plot. Temple's fortunes were prejudiced by Essex's fall: Sir Robert Cecil is said to have viewed him with marked disfavour.

Consequently, despairing of success in political affairs, Temple turned anew to literary study. In 1605 he brought out, with a dedication to Henry Frederick, Prince of Wales, A Logicall Analysis of Twentye Select Psalmes performed by W. Temple. He is the person named Temple for whom Bacon vainly endeavoured, through Thomas Murray of the privy chamber, to procure the honour of knighthood in 1607–1608.

=== Provost of Trinity College, Dublin ===
On 14 November 1609, Temple was made Provost of Trinity College Dublin. Robert Cecil, 1st Earl of Salisbury, the Chancellor of the university - despite his own rather low opinion of Temple - was induced to assent to the nomination at the request of James Ussher, Archbishop of Armagh.

Temple was appointed a master in chancery at Dublin on 31 January 1609–10, and he was returned to the Irish House of Commons as member for Dublin University in April 1613. He represented that constituency until his death.

Temple proved himself an efficient administrator of both college and university, attempting to bring them into conformity at all points with the educational system in vogue at the University of Cambridge. Many of his innovations became features of the academic organisation of Dublin. By careful manipulation of the revenues of the college, he increased the number of fellows from four to sixteen, and the number of scholars from twenty-eight to seventy. The fellows he was the first to divide into two classes, making seven of them senior fellows, and nine of them junior. The general government of the institution he entrusted to the senior fellows. He instituted many other administrative offices, to each of which he allotted definite functions, and his scheme of college offices remained unchanged for many years.

He drew up new statutes for both the college and the university, and endeavoured to obtain from King James I a new charter, extending the privileges which Queen Elizabeth I had granted in 1595. He was in London from May 1616 to May 1617 seeking to induce the government to accept his proposals, but his efforts failed.

His tenure in the office of provost was not altogether free from controversy. He defied the order of Archbishop George Abbot that he and his colleagues should wear surplices in the chapel. He insisted that as a layman he was entitled to dispense with that formality. Privately he was often in pecuniary difficulties, from which he sought to extricate himself by alienating the college estates to his wife and other relatives.

Temple was knighted by the Lord Deputy of Ireland, Sir Oliver St. John on 4 May 1622, and died at Trinity College Dublin, on 15 January 1627, being interned in the old college chapel (since pulled down). At the date of his death negotiations were begun for his resignation owing to 'his age and weakness' His will, dated 21 December 1626, is preserved in the public record office at Dublin. He possessed much land in Ireland.

== Personal life ==
His wife Martha, daughter of Robert Harrison, of a Derbyshire family, was sole executrix. By her, Temple left two sons, Sir John Temple, afterward Master of the Rolls in Ireland, and Thomas; and three daughters, Catharine, Mary, and Martha. The second son, Thomas, a Fellow of Trinity College Dublin, became rector of Old Ross, in the diocese of Ferns, on 6 March 1626 – 1627. He subsequently achieved a reputation as a Puritan preacher in London, where he exercised his ministry at Battersea from 1641 onwards. He preached before the Long Parliament, and was a member of the Westminster Assembly.

== His legacy ==
His Statutes at Trinity College, Dublin survived well into the 19th century, but he failed in his primary role of advancing the college aim of a Protestant seminary. He refused to encourage the Irish language within Trinity and regarded the destruction of the Irish language and culture as a necessary prerequisite to defeating the native Irish way of life. This in effect meant that Trinity's newly educated Protestant clergy were ill-equipped and unwilling to minister in Gaelic Ireland which made a mockery of King James the Sixth's grand plan to eliminate Catholicism and replace it with Protestantism in a complete religious and cultural transformation of Irish society.

On a personal level, his family dynasty flourished after his demise, particularly with the arrival of Cromwell's Puritan Age. His descendants include First Lords of the Admiralty, Secretaries of State, Keepers of the Privy Seal, First Lords of the Treasury, and prime minister Lord Palmerston, whose name came from the family estate that is now a Dublin village. His son and grandson both lived from time to time in their city townhouse that is now part of The Temple Bar. The family continued to pay Dublin Corporation an annual ground rent of £40 for this property for almost 200 years.

Academic offices
Preceded by Henry Alvey	Provost of Trinity College Dublin; 1609–1627	Succeeded by William Bedell
