= William Palliser (bishop) =

English clergyman and academic (1644–1726)

The Right Reverend William Palliser
- Archbishop of Cashel
- Church: Church of Ireland
- Diocese: Diocese of Cashel
- In office: 1694 to 1727
- Predecessor: Narcissus Marsh
- Successor: William Nicolson
- Other posts: Bishop of Cloyne (1692–1694); Professor of Divinity, Trinity College Dublin (1678–1692)

Orders
- Ordination: November 1669 (deacon); 28 January 1670 (priest)
- Consecration: 5 March 1692/3 by Francis Marsh

Personal details
- Denomination: Anglicanism

William Palliser (1644 – 1 January 1726 Old Style) was a clergyman (Church of Ireland) and academic. He was professor of divinity at Trinity College Dublin, then successively Church of Ireland Bishop of Cloyne and Archbishop of Cashel.

== Life ==
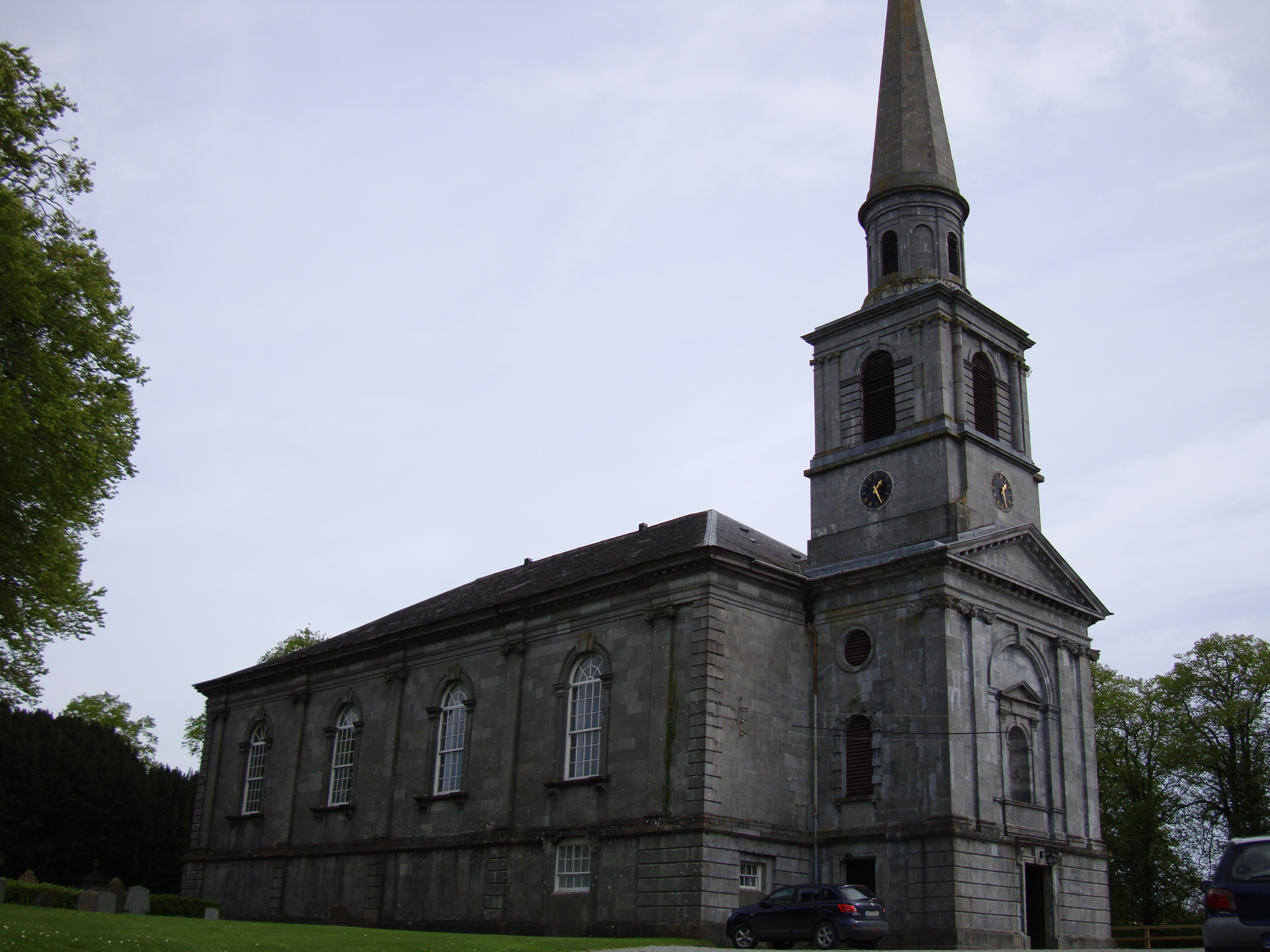
The Cathedral Church of Saint John the Baptist and Saint Patrick's Rock, Cashel, the episcopal seat of the Church of Ireland archbishops.

Palliser was of English birth, his grandfather, John Palliser, Esquire, being of Newby-super-Wiske, Yorkshire. He was baptised at Kirby Wiske on 28 July 1644, the son of John Palliser. He was educated at Northallerton Grammar School but his father had died before he entered Trinity College Dublin in 1660.

In 1668, he was elected a Fellow of Trinity, and in November 1669 he was ordained a deacon of the Church of Ireland. On 28 January he was ordained to the priesthood in St Patrick's Cathedral, Dublin. In October 1670 Palliser was elected as medicus of Trinity and in 1678 was appointed as professor of divinity. He gave the Latin oration at the funeral of Archbishop James Margetson of Armagh in September 1678.

On 14 February 1692/93, a year after the battle of the Boyne, appointed on 14 February 1692/3, Palliser was consecrated Bishop of Cloyne. On 10 April 1694 he was nominated as Archbishop of Cashel, this appointment being confirmed by letters patent dated 26 June 1694. After his translation he held the see until his death on 1 January 1726/27. He was buried in January 1726/7, at St. Andrew's in Dublin.

Palliser married, firstly, Elizabeth Hoey, daughter of William Hoey, M.P. for Naas, Ireland, and their only child was buried 17 September 1683, at St Peter & St Kevin, Dublin. His wife was buried shortly afterwards, on 21 or 26 September 1683, at St Werburgh's in Dublin, Ireland. His second wife, Mary Wheeler, was the widow of William Greatreakes, whom she had married in December, 1683. He died on 27 September 1686, at which time his widow was pregnant. He was the son of Valentine Greatrakes, the well-known faith healer. By his second wife, he had one son, William Palliser (who married Jane Pennefather and died childless in 1769) and one daughter, Jane, who married John Bury of Shannon Grove. Their eldest son, William Bury, was High Sheriff of County Limerick and was father of Charles Bury, 1st Earl of Charleville. The second son, John, assumed the name and arms of Palliser and was the ancestor of the brothers, Sir William Palliser, M.P. and Captain John Palliser.

Palliser was a substantial benefactor of his old college, Trinity.
