= William Arthur Watts =

Irish academic

William Watts

41st Provost of Trinity College Dublin
- In office 1 August 1981 – 29 July 1991
- Preceded by: F. S. L. Lyons
- Succeeded by: Thomas Noel Mitchell

Personal details
- Born: William Arthur Watts; 26 May 1930 Dublin, Ireland
- Died: 26 April 2010 (aged 79) Dublin, Ireland
- Spouse: Geraldine Watts (m. 1954)
- Children: 3
- Education: Trinity College Dublin: B.A. (Modern Languages), 1952; B.A., (Natural Sciences), 1953

William Arthur Watts (26 May 1930 – 26 April 2010) was an Irish academic who served as the 41st provost of Trinity College Dublin from 1981 to 1991. He was professor of Botany at Trinity College.

He was born in Dublin's docklands and studied Modern Languages at Trinity, where he was elected a scholar in 1950, graduating in 1952 and in Natural Sciences the following year. He became a fellow of Trinity in 1960, a reader in Botany in 1964, a professor in 1966 and provost from 1981 to 1991.

He was president of the Royal Irish Academy from 1982 to 1986.

Academic offices
Preceded by F. S. L. Lyons	Provost of Trinity College Dublin; 1981–1991	Succeeded by Thomas Mitchell
