= Richard Lingard =

Richard Lingard was an Anglican priest and academic in Ireland in the seventeenth century.

Lingard was educated at Trinity College, Dublin.

He was Dean of Lismore from 1662 to 1670 and Regius Professor of Divinity at TCD from 1670 to 1678.

In his 1696 pamphlet titled "A Letter of Advice to a Young Gentleman Leaving the University Concerning His Behaviour and Conversation in the World," Lingard wrote, "If you would read a mans [sic] Disposition, see him Game, you will then learn more of him in one hour, than in seven Years Conversation." This appears to be the source of the similar statement "You can discover more about a person in an hour of play than in a year of conversation", which has been mis-attributed to Plato since at least as early as the 1950s.
