= Daniel Hutchinson =

Mayor of Dublin, Ireland

Daniel Hutchinson (fl. 1650s) was an Irish Protestant Dublin merchant who supported the Cromwellian Occupation of Ireland. During the Interregnum he served as Mayor of Dublin, a member of parliament of the Barebones and First Protectorate parliaments, Sheriff of County Dublin and Wicklow, and as Treasurer of Public Revenue in Ireland.

== Biography ==
Hutchinson served as Mayor of Dublin in 1652 (during which time he was ordered to form a committee with Jerome Sankey to encourages demobbed English parliamentary soldiers and other who supported the English Parliamentary cause to settle in Ireland). He was one of six Irish members of the Barebones Parliament in 1653. During the same year he was a member of a committee to oversee laws relating to the poor. (Note: Other members of the 1653 poor committee: Thomas Herbert, an army officer and Clerk of the Council in Ireland.(Wallace 2004, p. 20); Thomas Hooke, a Dublin merchant and who supplied the English army;(Wallace 2004, p. 21); Henry Jones (c.1605 – 1682), Bishop of Clogher and a scout for Oliver Cromwell; Colonel Jerome Sankey, was educated at Cambridge University, who came to Ireland as an army officer with Oliver Cromwell (Wallace 2004, p. 20).)

In 1655 Hutchinson was a member of a committee, with two other Dublin merchants Thomas Hooke and John Preston, (Note: John Preston was another Dublin merchant (Wallace 2004, p. 21).) to act as treasurers for the collection for the Waldensians (Protestants who were at that time being persecuted in France).

In 1656 Hutchinson was High Sheriff for Dublin and Wicklow. He also bought Adventurers' assignments, lent money to the Cromwellian government and was an elder in the Church of St. Nicholas Within.

Hutchinson and Hooke were Protestant merchants who before the Cromwellian conquest of Ireland were not a member of the political and mercantile elite (who were usually members of the Dublin Merchant Guild). The most prominent merchants during the Interregnum were Hutchinson, Hooke, Preston and Richard Tighe. They all served as alderman, were all Mayors of Dublin, and all worshipped at Dr Samuel Winter's independent congregation meeting at Church of St. Nicholas Within (Hooke like Hutchinson was an elder of the church).

== Notes ==
Civic offices
Preceded by Richard Tighe	Mayor of Dublin; 1652–1653	Succeeded by John Preston
