= Sarah Pue =

- Born: Sarah Gibbal; Dublin, Ireland
- Died: 1777?
- Known for: proprietor of Dick's Coffee House and publisher of Pue's Occurrences

Sarah Pue (died 1777?) was an Irish printer, publisher, patent medicine seller, and proprietor of Dick's Coffee House.

== Life ==
Sarah Pue was born Sarah Gibbal. She was the daughter of John, a skinner of Skinner's Row, Dublin, and his wife Mary Gibbal. She married James Pue on 29 September 1761. Her husband was the successor of his uncle Richard Pue, taking over the Pue businesses of printing, publishing and owning Dick's Coffee House in 1758. After James' death in December 1762, Pue took over running the businesses.

Pue married John Roe in April 1763, and the couple had two sons. John Roe had been a business associate of James Pue since 1758, and they printed Pue's Occurrences, as well as running Dick's Coffee house until 1769, when his brother Crompton Roe took over. When her husband died in December 1773, Pue assumed control of the paper, going into partnership with her brother, David Gibbal. In June 1776, she sold the business to John Hillary of Castle Street. She sold patent medicines from her premises in Skinner Row from 1762 to 1776, and then from College Green from 1777. After 1777, she disappears from records.

== See also ==
- List of women printers and publishers before 1800
