= Philip Skelton =

Irish Protestant clergyman and writer

Philip Skelton (1707–1787) was an Irish Protestant clergyman and writer.

== Life ==
The son of Richard Skelton, a farmer, gunsmith tanner, he was born at Derriaghy, County Antrim, in February 1707. His mother, Arabella Cathcart, was the daughter of a farmer, and the tenancy, under Lord Conway, of the farm at Derriaghy was her marriage portion. Philip, who had five brothers and four sisters, was sent in 1717 to a Latin school at Lisburn. His father died before he was eleven, and it was only by severe economy that his mother could educate her ten children.

In June 1724, he entered Trinity College Dublin, as a sizar with Patrick Delany as his tutor, and in 1726 was elected a Scholar. He graduated B.A. in July 1728, and, after teaching in the endowed school of Dundalk, was nominated curate to Samuel Madden of Drummilly, County Fermanagh, and ordained deacon by John Stearne, bishop of Clogher, in 1729. He lived with Madden as tutor to his sons.

In 1732, he became curate at Monaghan, where the rector paid him £40 a year. He rode up to Dublin, and, appearing before the privy council, obtained the pardon of a condemned man unjustly convicted. He studied physic and prescribed for the poor, argued successfully with profligates and sectaries, persuaded lunatics out of their delusions, fought and trounced a company of profane travelling tinkers, and chastised a military officer who persisted in swearing. He became for a short time in 1742 tutor to James Caulfeild, 1st Earl of Charlemont, and in 1743 dedicated 'Truth in a Mask' to his pupil. A difference with Mr. Adderley, Lord Charlemont's stepfather, led to his return to his curacy in Monaghan.

In 1750, Skelton was given the living of Templecarn, a large parish in the counties of Donegal and Fermanagh, consisting of wild moorland surrounding Lough Derg, in which is St. Patrick's Purgatory, the most famous place of pilgrimage in Ireland. There was no rectory house, and the emolument was about £200 a year. He more than once assembled his people to see him die, till one parishioner said, 'Make a day, sir, and keep it, and don't be always disappointing us thus.' There was a famine in 1757, and he sold his books to buy meal for the people. Lady Barrymore and Miss Leslie sent him £50, hoping he might keep his books, but he said the poor needed more than their price, and devoted the gift to them.

By 1759, he was given the living of Devenish, County Fermanagh, and lived in Enniskillen, which is contiguous. Here he had a large congregation. In 1766 he was presented to the living of Fintona, or Donacavey, County Tyrone, and went to reside there. The people were intemperate and ignorant, and he reformed and instructed them. There was a famine in 1773, and he again sustained the poor; and in 1778 another famine at Fintona, attended by smallpox and typhus, caused him to sell his library, which he had renewed.

In 1780, he came to live in Dublin. He died on 4 May 1787, and was buried near the west door of St. Peter's Church.

== Works ==
Skelton's first publication was an anonymous pamphlet in favour of Samuel Madden's scheme for premiums in Trinity College. He published anonymous discourses against Socinians, and in 1736 an attack on Benjamin Hoadly's views of the Eucharist, entitled A Vindication of the Right Rev. the Lord Bishop of Winchester, whom he ironically supposes incapable of having written the book attributed to him. His next publication Some Proposals for the Revival of Christianity (1736) was again ironical; Jonathan Swift was at first suspected of the authorship. In 1737 Skelton published A Dissertation on the Constitution and Effects of a Petty Jury endeavouring to show that such juries led to false swearing, and in 1741 The Necessity of Tillage and Granaries, as well as an account in the Philosophical Transactions of an extraordinary development of caterpillars seen in Ireland in 1737.

In 1744 Skelton published The Candid Reader, a satire on the verse-making of Hill the mathematician, on the Rhapsody of Lord Shaftesbury, and the Hurlothrumbo of Samuel Johnson. In the same year he issued A Letter to the Authors of the Divine Analogy and the Minute Philosopher, and in 1745 The Chevalier's Hopes, a paper in which he showed Whig principles. He went to London in 1748 to publish Ophiomaches, or Deism Revealed. Andrew Millar, the bookseller, showed the manuscript to David Hume, who advised him to print it. A second edition with amendments published by Millar appeared in 1751, and the book was commended by Thomas Sherlock. It contains eight conversations between Dechaine and Cunningham, deists; Shepherd, a clergyman, and Templeton, a layman, uncertain in his belief, but inclined to Christianity. Anthony Collins and John Toland, Thomas Chubb and Shaftesbury, are sharply dealt with. Millar published a second edition. In 1751 he published The Dignity of the Christian Ministry: a Sermon.

Skelton again visited London in 1754, and published Discourses Controversial and Practical on various subjects. In 1759 he published, as a reply to an Arian pamphlet, An Appeal to the Common Sense of all Christian People, and soon after that a Description of Lough Derg. In 1770 he published his collected works by subscription, in five volumes octavo, for the benefit of the Magdalen charity in Dublin. In 1784 he published An Appeal to Common Sense on the subject of Christianity, thirteen hymns and a Latin poem, and in 1786 Senilia, and a short account of Watson's Catechism.

The retired Dublin printer, Sarah Cotter was so inspired by An Appeal to Common Sense on the subject of Christianity, she offered and paid for a cheaper edition of the book to allow for a wider circulation of the text. Skelton gave Cotter permission to have a portrait drawn of him on the condition that it not be copied and that she destroy it before her death, which she did three months before she died in March 1792.
