= Elizabeth Pue =

Irish newspaper publisher

- Known for: proprietor of Dick's Coffee House and publisher of Pue's Occurrences

Elizabeth Pue (fl. 1722 - 1726) was an Irish newspaper publisher, bookseller, and proprietor of Dick's Coffee House.

== Biography ==
Following the death of her husband, Richard Pue in 1722, Elizabeth Pue took over the publishing business and running of their coffee house, Skinner's Row, Dublin. She continued to publish her husband's newspaper, Pue's Occurrences, with Cornelius Carter along with one other work. Their relationship was damaged when Carter sold a successful "fam'd royal eye water" until Pue started selling a similar product, with Pue publicly questioning the reliability and strength of Pue's product. Under her, Pue's Occurrences became politically aligned with the sitting government, with Pue receiving payment in secret from Dublin Castle "for advertising in her news paper 4 sev'l times against Harding the printer" in June 1723, calling for his arrest for publishing pro-Jacobite propaganda.

Pue ceased working for the family business by 1726, with her son Richard taking over. An Elizabeth Pue was buried at Church of St. Nicholas Within, Dublin on 19 December 1749, but this might have been her granddaughter.

== See also ==
- List of women printers and publishers before 1800
