= Richard Pue =

- Died: 1722
- Resting place: Church of St. Nicholas Within, Dublin
- Known for: proprietor of Dick's Coffee House and publisher of Pue's Occurrences

Richard Pue (died 1722) was an Irish newspaper publisher, bookseller, and proprietor of Dick's Coffee House.

== Life ==
The date and place of Richard Pue's birth is unknown. He established Dick's Coffee House, Skinner's Row, Dublin sometime before July 1698. Pue became a freeman of Dublin in 1701 as a member of the Dyers' Guild. On 25 December 1703 he began publishing Impartial Occurrences with Edward Lloyd. This paper was delivered by post across the country, with Pue acting as editor until 1706. The paper ceased in February 1706, reappearing in February 1712 as Pue's Occurrences. In late December 1705, Lloyd and Pue jointly published a satirical attack on Protestant dissent by Jonathan Swift called A tale of a tub. They also printed the Votes of the Irish house of commons (nos 1-65) between July and October 1707 and May and June 1709.

Owing to Pue's political leanings, Dick's was a centre for residual Protestant Jacobite interest in Dublin, with Robert Rochfort and his allies frequenting the coffeehouse. Pue increasingly became a Tory, and became increasingly intolerant of Jacobite opinion, informing Dublin Castle of "papist murmuring" in 1707 and Jacobite activities in Dick's. From 1710, he published or republished Tory pamphlets on topics such as the trial of Henry Sacheverell in London.

In 1714 after the accession of the Hanoverian monarchy, Pue suffered for his earlier Tory support, being imprisoned briefly by the Irish house of commons in February 1715. This was part of an overall purge of Dublin's Tory press, with Pue being taken in custody again in November 1717. He left Ireland for a time, returning in late December, publishing Pue's Occurrences again on 4 January 1718. He held a number of auctions from Dick's from the 1720s, as well as selling "eye water" and other health elixirs. Pue was a successful printer who was not sworn into the Printers’ Guild. Pue died in early 1722, and was buried at the church of Church of St. Nicholas Within, Dublin on 10 May 1722. His wife Elizabeth took over his businesses after his death, and in turn was succeeded by their son Richard.
