= John Sherlock =

John Sherlock may refer to:

- John Sherlock (general), Spanish brigadier general
- Sir John Sherlock (politician), Irish landowner, politician and courtier
- John Michael Sherlock, Canadian bishop
- Jack Sherlock, English footballer
- Monk Sherlock, baseball player
