= Richard Tighe =

Richard Tighe may refer to:

- Richard Tighe (mayor) (died 1673), mayor of Dublin (1651–52), MP for the City of Dublin in the First Protectorate Parliament (1654–55)
- Richard Tighe (Newtownards MP) (1678–1736), Privy Counsellors of Ireland (1718), MP of Newtownards (Parliament of Ireland constituency) (1715, 1725)
