= Sarah Cotter =

Irish printer and bookseller

Sarah Cotter (died 1792) was an Irish printer and bookseller in the mid-18th century.

== Life ==
Sarah Cotter was possibly the sister or daughter of the bookseller Joseph Cotter, who died around 1751. She took over his business, operating under Dick's Coffee House, Skinner Row, Dublin since 1744 and under her auspices until 1774. Cotter is one of the few women to be admitted into the guild of St Luke the Evangelist as a quarter-brother in 1756, which was usually denied to women as they were not permitted full freedom. She paid quarterage to the guild until 1770.

Cotter noticed there was a market for a publisher specialising in legal works, engaging in this work with other printers as she did with Oliver Nelson and Richard Watts (fl. 1745–1762) in the publication of Sir John Strange's Reports of adjudged cases in the courts of Chancery (1756). She established herself as a law publisher and bookseller, issuing a Sale catalogue of law books for 1766, and advertised regularly with newspapers including the Dublin Journal and Freeman's Journal.

She fostered links with the book trade in London, importing books and appearing as the Dublin agent on London imprints. Other publications by Cotter included Poems by Eminent Ladies (1757), Shakespeare's Measure for measure (1761), Philosophical enquiry (4th ed. 1766) by Edmund Burke, and A collection of apothegms and maxims for the good conduct of life by Gorges Edmond Howard (1767).

Cotter married Joseph Stringer (fl. 1754–1783) in 1768. He was a Dublin painter-stainer. Cotter continued to trade under her married name, printing The wonder! or a woman keeps a secret a play by Susanna Centlivre the same year. Her husband and former apprentice Charles Ingham (fl. 1747–1792) managed the business from 1768, with Cotter officially retiring in 1774. Cotter wrote to Philip Skelton on 21 September 1784 from Summerhill, Dublin, praising his book An appeal to commonsense on the subject of Christianity.

To promote his ideas, she offered and paid for a cheaper edition to be printed to allow for a wider circulation. Later, he gave her permission to have his portrait drawn, on the proviso that no copies would be made and Cotter would destroy it before her death. She did so three months before her death in 1792, with her will proved at the Dublin prerogative court the same year. Cotter's books are included in the 1916 A catalogue of the Bradshaw collection of Irish books in the University of Cambridge 1602–1882.

== See also ==
- List of women printers and publishers before 1800
