= Richard Tighe (mayor) =

Mayor of Dublin, Ireland

Richard Tighe (died 1673) of Woodstock, County Kilkenny, and Rossana, County Wicklow, was a justice of the peace, Mayor of Dublin in 1651 and 1655, High Sheriff of County Dublin in 1655, and High Sheriff of Kildare in 1662, and represented Dublin city in the Second Protectorate Parliament in 1656.

== Biography ==
Tighe was born in England and emigrated to Dublin sometime before 1649 and probably before 1641. During the Interregnum he supported the English Commonwealth government, probably as a bulwark against the Catholics, rather than a supporter of republicanism, and was against the suppression of the corporation of which the governor, Charles Fleetwood, was in favour.

The Dublin merchants who most prominently lent support to the Commonwealth during the Interregnum were Daniel Hutchinson, Thomas Hooke, John Preston and Richard Tighe. They all served as alderman, were all Mayors of Dublin, all lent money to the regime and all worshipped at Dr Samuel Winter's independent congregation meeting at the Church of St. Nicholas Within (Hooke, like Hutchinson, was an elder of the church).

Tighe was a justice of the peace; Mayor of Dublin in 1651; High Sheriff of County Dublin in 1655 and represented the City of Dublin in the Second Protectorate Parliament in 1656. After the Restoration he was High Sheriff of County Kildare in 1662. During the 1650s Tighe acquired estates in Counties Carlow, Dublin, and Westmeath.

He died on 20 February 1673 and was buried in the churchyard of St Michan's Church, Dublin.

== Family ==
Tighe married Mary, daughter of Thomas Rooke. They had one son William and three daughters. She died in 1677 and was also buried in St Michan's Church. Tighe's daughter Anne after she was widowed by her first husband Theophilus Sandf married a former Mayor of Dublin Alderman John Preston. Tighe's grandson Right Hon. Richard Tighe, M.P., married Barbara, daughter and co-heiress of Christian Borr Esq., of Drinagh and Borrmount, County Wexford.

It is believed Tighe Street in Dublin was named for him and his family before later being renamed as Benburb Street in 1890.

== Notes ==
Civic offices
Preceded by Raphael Hunt	Mayor of Dublin; 1651–1652	Succeeded by Daniel Hutchinson
Preceded by Thomas Hooke	Mayor of Dublin; 1655–1656	Succeeded by Ridgley Hatfield
