= RGRE v Bewley's =

Irish legal case

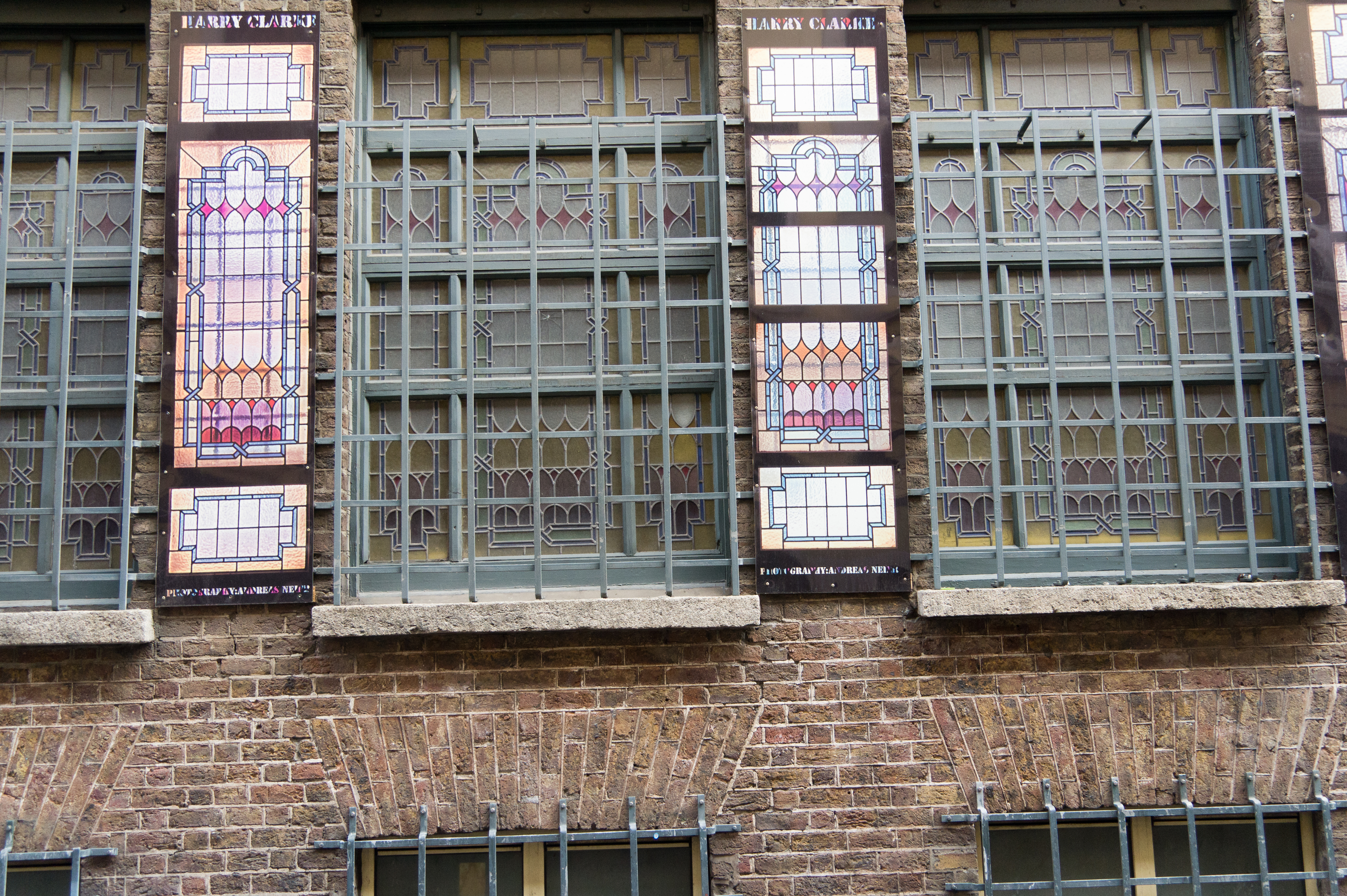
- Windows of former Bewley's Café
- Court: Irish High Court
- Full case name: RGRE Grafton Ltd v Bewley's Cafe Grafton Street Ltd and Bewley’s Ltd
- Decided: TBC

Court membership
- Judge sitting: Mr Justice Denis McDonald

RGRE Grafton Ltd v Bewley's Cafe Grafton Street Ltd and Bewley’s Ltd was an Irish legal case between building owners RGRE Grafton Ltd and tenants Bewley's Cafe Grafton Street Ltd and Bewley's Ltd. The case related to non-payment of rent during the COVID-19 pandemic at which time Bewley's claimed ownership of six windows at the property. RGRE sought a declaration that the stained-glass windows, designed by Harry Clarke, at Bewley's Oriental Café on Grafton Street in Dublin form part of the building and therefore belong to the landlord, as opposed to decorative panels that belong to the tenants. The dispute arose as when the windows were installed in the 1920's Ernest Bewley owned the building and had leased it to a company which he controlled. It was unclear as to which entity commissioned and installed the windows and both freehold and leasehold have since been transferred to unrelated entities.

In October 2022 it was announced that the judgment from Mr Justice Denis McDonald would be delayed until at least 8 December. In January 2023 the court decided that some of the windows belonged to the landlord and some to the tenant.

In July 2024, the Court of Appeal ruled (overturning part of the 2023 ruling) that all six of the works were part of building and therefore the property of RGRE Grafton Ltd.

The CoA decision was appealed to the Irish Supreme Court which dismissed the appellant's [Bewley's] appeal on 18 February 2026 on the basis that Bewley's could not demonstrate on the balance of probabilities that the tenant paid for the windows and that, on standard legal interpretation, they were "part and parcel" of the landlord's property.
