= Jonathan Edwards (priest) =

Jonathan Edwards (1615 – 1681) was born in Stansty, Denbighshire, Wales. He was educated at Jesus College, Oxford, matriculating on 3 February 1633 and obtaining degrees of B.A. on 9 June 1634, M.A. on 24 April 1637 and D.D. in November 1642. He was a Fellow of Jesus College from 1636 to 1648. He was a prebendary of Kilkenny and Chancellor of Ferns. He became Chaplain of the Chantry and Curate of Church of St. Nicholas Within, Dublin in October, 1661. He was installed as Archdeacon of Derry on 16 February 1664, and was still in post in 1679; the end-date of his appointment is uncertain. He probably died around January or February, 1681.

His sister, Margaret, married John Jones, one of the regicides of King Charles I.
