= Peace Park, Dublin =

Public park in Dublin, Ireland

Peace Park
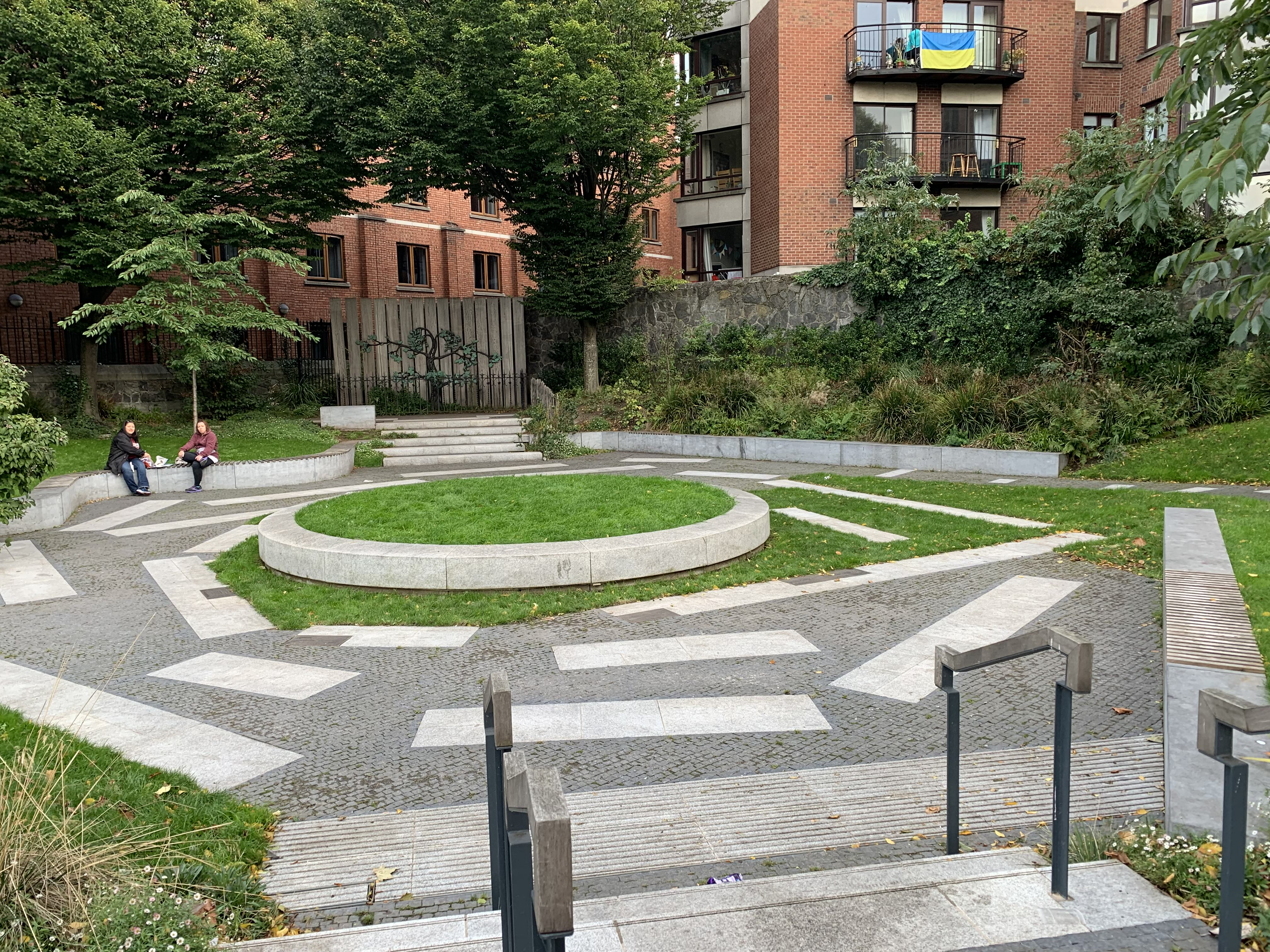
- The park in 2022
- Interactive map of Peace Park
- Type: Municipal city park
- Location: 13 Christchurch Place, Dublin, Ireland
- Coordinates: 53.3428°N 6.2714°W
- Area: 0.247 acres (0.10 ha)
- Opened: 12 September 1988 (38 years ago)
- Operator: Dublin City Council
- Open: all year
- Website: www.dublincity.ie/residential/parks/dublin-city-parks/visit-park/peace-park

The Peace Park (Irish: Garraí an tSuaimhnis, meaning 'Garden of Tranquillity'), originally named the Peace Garden, is a pocket park located across from Christchurch Cathedral on the corner of Nicholas Street and Christchurch Place in the Liberties area of Dublin, Ireland.

== History ==
=== Background ===
The park is situated on the site of Dublin's old Tholsel, an important building which combined the function of civic hall, guildhall, court and gaol from the time of the Norman invasion of Ireland until it was demolished around 1809.

Activities carried on at the Tholsel included that of a merchants' exchange, and sittings of the City Recorder's Court where punishments for crimes less serious than murder were meted out. These punishments included being whipped while being dragged behind a horse and cart from Skinner's Row (modern day Christchurch Place) to College Green some distance away. Alternatively, convicted people were flayed and/or pilloried at the front of the building. These punishments had ceased by the late 1700s. Part of the remains of the church of St. Nicholas Within stand to the south-west of the park.

=== Design and opening ===
Designed in the late 1980s as a sunken garden on a previously vacant site, the Peace Garden, as it was first known, was intended to provide a quieter space away from the traffic noise of the busy junction at which it exists. Dedicated in 1988 to the Republic of Ireland's aspiration for peace during the Troubles, the park was funded by Cement Roadstone Holdings, and officially opened on 12 September 1988 by Lord Mayor of Dublin Councillor Ben Briscoe, with music from the boys choir of Saint Patrick's Cathedral.

The park was built by Dublin Corporation as part of a drive to "regenerate the inner city", for which it received IR£53,000 in private sponsorship for the project. RTÉ noted during its coverage of the opening that the Corporation were seeking further sponsorship for similar schemes.

A week later, the park served as the endpoint of the Workers' Party's "Dublin March for Peace", held to mark the UN International Day of Peace. The park subsequently hosted other peace-related events, including the Irish Peace Council's "Wear White for Peace" rally in February 1989. It also served as a meeting point for educational walks and as a venue for wreath-laying ceremonies commemorating victims of violence in Northern Ireland.

=== Criticism ===
On 5 January 1989, the environment correspondent for The Irish Times, Frank McDonald, wrote that the absence of civic design was "painfully evident" from the two 'pocket parks' which had been created for the Dublin Millennium celebrations (1,000 years of Dublin) the previous year. He wrote that both the Peace Garden, as well as the Millennium Garden beside City Hall, did not relate in any way to their setting.

Christ Church Cathedral, which lies across the road from the park

On 15 March 1989, McDonald wrote that there were those who would argue that the Peace Garden at Christchurch Place was "infinitely preferable" to what had been on the site before, "a derelict site lurking behind a green-painted corrugated hoarding." He argued, however, that despite the positive features of the sunken garden and fountain, these conditions ignored the park's "utterly negative impact on the battle-scarred streetscape of the area" being without a line of railings of trees in front of the park to "define the boundary of the street." He noted that the vertical crazy paving at the rear of the park, coupled with the trees and shrubs and plaque commemorating Roadstone's generosity, gave the impression of an exhibit at a garden festival.

=== Jury's development ===
In April 1989, it was noted that the Jury's Hotel group had offered to buy a "largely derelict" 1.8-acre site next to the park. Alderman Carmencita Hederman appealed to Dublin Corporation to ensure that the proposed development would incorporate the "quite pathetic" Peace Park, by building on it and relocating the park into the centre of their proposed site. Jury's Hotel lodged their planning application for the site in November 1989, in which they planned to build over the park:

The scheme also incorporates the corporation's Peace Park, which is to be moved from its present position on the corner to a new location in the centre of the site, with a double-height entrance though one of the office buildings and a secondary entrance via a narrow medieval-style lane beside the ruin of St Nicholas Within."

Architects Burke Kennedy Doyle noted that it was "essential to relocate (the park) in the interests of re-establishing the streetscape" of the area, although it was recorded that the plan was initially opposed by senior corporation officials. In September 1990, The Irish Times remarked that the parks department ultimately halted the plans to build over the park, citing that as the site was a 'public park' it would require an Act of Parliament to remove it.

=== Features ===
Millennium Child by John Behan (2000)

As of 1993, the park was paved with a type of rock from County Clare named Liscannor Flagstone, "characterised by traces of unknown organisms". Prior to redevelopment in 2019, the park's main features included a bronze 'Tree of Life' statue, a fountain, and quotes from Irish poets W. B. Yeats and Patrick Kavanagh engraved on surfaces. The 'Tree of Life' cast bronzes were originally placed in the garden for the Dublin Millennium celebrations which were celebrated in the city in 1988 (other commemorative ventures that year included the installation of the Molly Malone statue on Grafton Street). In front of the park stands "Millennium Child", a sculpture of three bronze statues of children playing created by John Behan which was unveiled by President of Ireland Mary McAleese in November 2000 to celebrate "the Children of the New Millennium".

=== Closure and refurbishment ===
In 2009/2010 it was decided to close the park indefinitely due to loitering and anti-social behaviour and for nearly 10 years afterwards it remained shut.

The park pre-refurbishment

As part of Dublin City Council's 'Liberties Greening Strategy', the park was identified for refurbishment in the 2010s. In July 2018, Dermot Foley Landscape Architects (DFLA) were commissioned by Dublin City Council to revive the existing park and reinvent it as a memorial. The park had been closed for many years prior to the restoration and elements of a previous design were damaged. The Flanders Fields memorial was installed as well as herbaceous ground cover planting and a canopy layer of viburnum farreri and prunus × yedoensis, providing seasonal foliage, floral display and fragrance. DFLA's intention was to "create a space of intimacy in a very busy city-centre location, using materials that would calm the experience". Other practical considerations included "opening up" the space, allowing improved visibility into the park as well as increased passive surveillance.

Prunus × yedoensis, which forms part of the canopy layer in the refurbished park

On 26 June 2019, the Peace Park was officially re-opened by a representative of Lord Mayor Paul McAuliffe after nearly a decade of closure due to anti-social behaviour such as public drinking and drug use. A refurbishment project and the Flanders Fields memorial had been completed while it was shut. The newly designed garden had also been raised with a ramped access so that it be fully accessible, which the original was not:

The original garden was "sunken", a popular theme at the time, but the space was problematic because the steps and low wall did not comply with updated standards for universal access and safety.

Carlow limestone setts and Wicklow granite were used for the pavement, steps and seating, matching the quality of the original garden and materials used in recent Dublin City Council improvements at St Audoen's Park and Christ Church Cathedral. Dublin City Council said that the aim of the memorial was "to bring people together in reflection about war and peace, about sacrifice and suffering, about tolerance and hope, about forgiveness and reconciliation".

=== Flanders Fields memorial ===
On 30 April 2019, a memorial to all those from the island of Ireland who died in Flanders Fields during World War I was unveiled in the park. A ceremony took place to mark the occasion which was jointly organised by Dublin City Council and the government of Flanders, Belgium. Soil from Flanders was integrated with Irish soil from all four provinces and placed within a circle of sandblasted Leinster granite reflecting the circular design in the roof of the Menin Gate war memorial in Ypres, Belgium. The memorial was covered with a grass sward and engraved with poetry from Irish war poet Francis Ledwidge. Around the memorial, benches of Belgian blue stone were engraved with the crests of Leinster, Munster, Ulster and Connacht.

== Controversies ==
At the January 2018 meeting of Dublin City Council's commemorations subcommittee, where the members were briefed on the proposal to incorporate Irish soil into the Flanders Fields memorial at the Peace Park, four members of the committee opposed the Flanders Memorial. It had been argued previously by councillors, including the former Lord Mayor Mícheál Mac Donncha, and the then current Lord Mayor Nial Ring, that it would be inappropriate to have a war memorial in a 'peace' garden or park. In a February 2018 meeting, the alternative option of placing it instead in the War Memorial Gardens, Islandbridge was explored but ultimately rejected.

The choosing of 1988 as the year in which to celebrate the millennium of the founding of Dublin city was also not without its own controversy.

== See also ==
- Island of Ireland Peace Park, Belgium
- List of public art in Dublin
- Peace Park, Cork
- Peace Park, Sligo
