= Theatre Royal Haymarket =

West End theatre in London

Haymarket Theatre
- 1720: Little Theatre (nearby); 1767: Theatre Royal
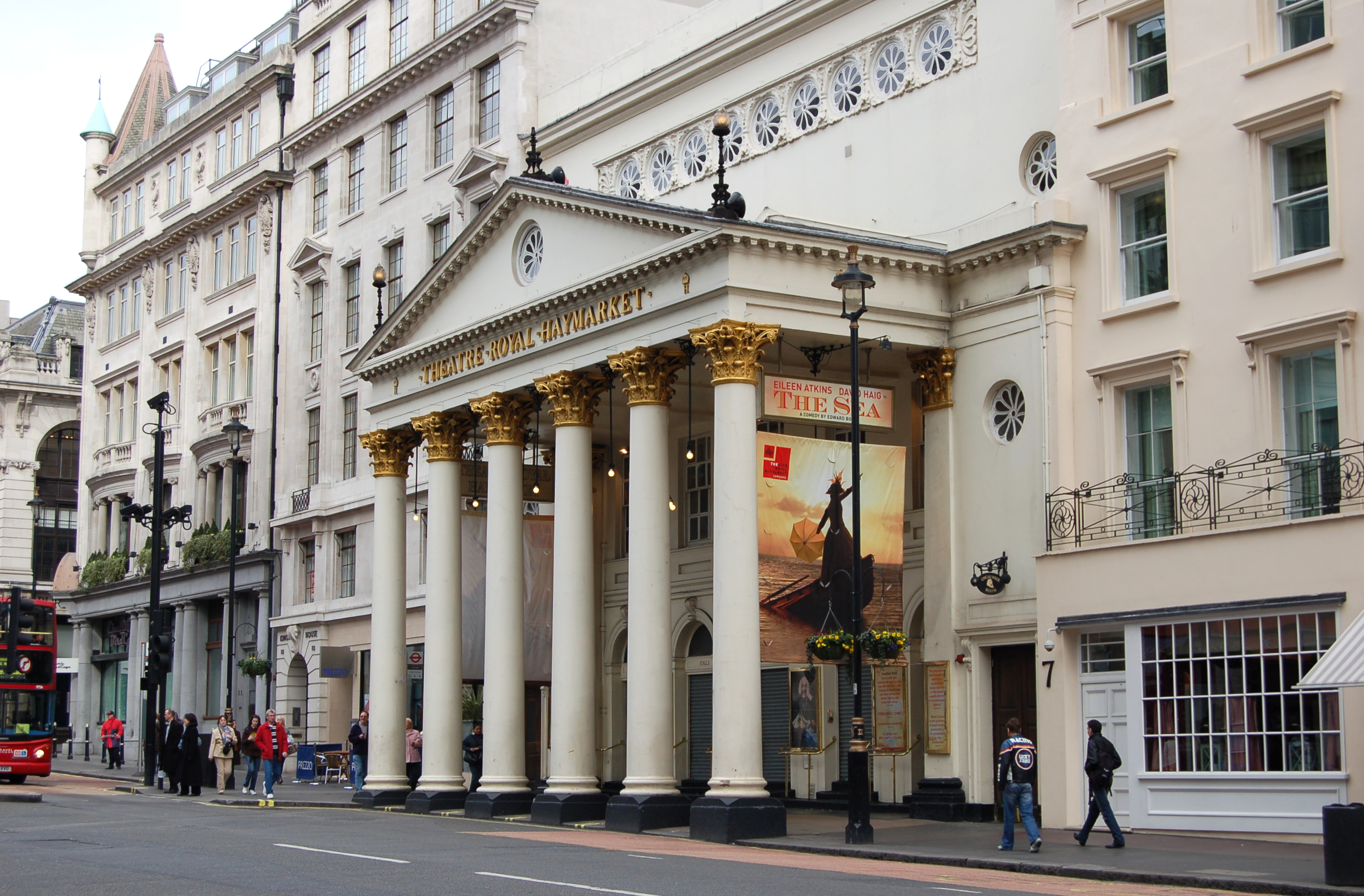
- The theatre in 2008, showing Edward Bond's The Sea
- Interactive map of Haymarket Theatre
- Address: Suffolk Street, Haymarket; London, SW1; United Kingdom
- Coordinates: 51°30′31″N 0°07′53″W
- Owner: Access Entertainment
- Operator: Access Entertainment
- Capacity: 888 on 4 levels
- Type: West End theatre
- Production: The Standard of Living
- Public transit: Piccadilly Circus

Construction
- Opened: 4 July 1821; 205 years ago (current structure)
- Rebuilt: 1879: proscenium and removal of pit 1904: auditorium 1994: major refurbishment
- Years active: 1720–present
- Architect: John Nash

Website
- www.trh.co.uk

Listed Building – Grade I
- Official name: The Haymarket Theatre (Theatre Royal)
- Designated: 14 January 1970
- Reference no.: 1066641

The Theatre Royal Haymarket (also known as Haymarket Theatre or the Little Theatre) is a West End theatre in Haymarket in the City of Westminster which dates back to 1720, making it the third-oldest London playhouse still in use. Samuel Foote acquired the lease in 1747, and in 1766 he gained a royal patent to play legitimate drama (meaning spoken drama, as opposed to opera, concerts or plays with music) in the summer months. The original building was a little further north in the same street. It has been at its current location since 1821, when it was redesigned by John Nash. It is a Grade I listed building, with a seating capacity of 888. The freehold of the theatre is owned by the Crown Estate.

The Haymarket has been the site of a significant innovation in theatre. In 1873, it was the venue for the first scheduled matinée performance, establishing a custom soon followed in theatres everywhere. Its managers have included Benjamin Nottingham Webster, John Baldwin Buckstone, Squire Bancroft, Cyril Maude, Herbert Beerbohm Tree, and John Sleeper Clarke, brother-in-law of John Wilkes Booth, who quit America after the assassination of Abraham Lincoln. Famous actors who débuted at the theatre included Robert William Elliston (1774–1831) and John Liston (1776–1846).

== History of the theatre ==
=== Origins and early years ===
The first Hay Market theatre was built in 1720 by John Potter, carpenter, on the site of The King's Head Inn in the Haymarket and a shop in Suffolk Street kept by Isaac Bliburgh, a gunsmith, and known by the sign of the Cannon and Musket. It was the third public theatre opened in the West End. The theatre cost £1000 to build, with a further £500 expended on decorations, scenery and costumes. It opened on 29 December 1720, with a French play La Fille a la Morte, ou le Badeaut de Paris performed by a company later known as The French Comedians of His Grace the Duke of Montague. Potter's speculation was known as The New French Theatre. Its name was changed to Little Theatre in the Hay.

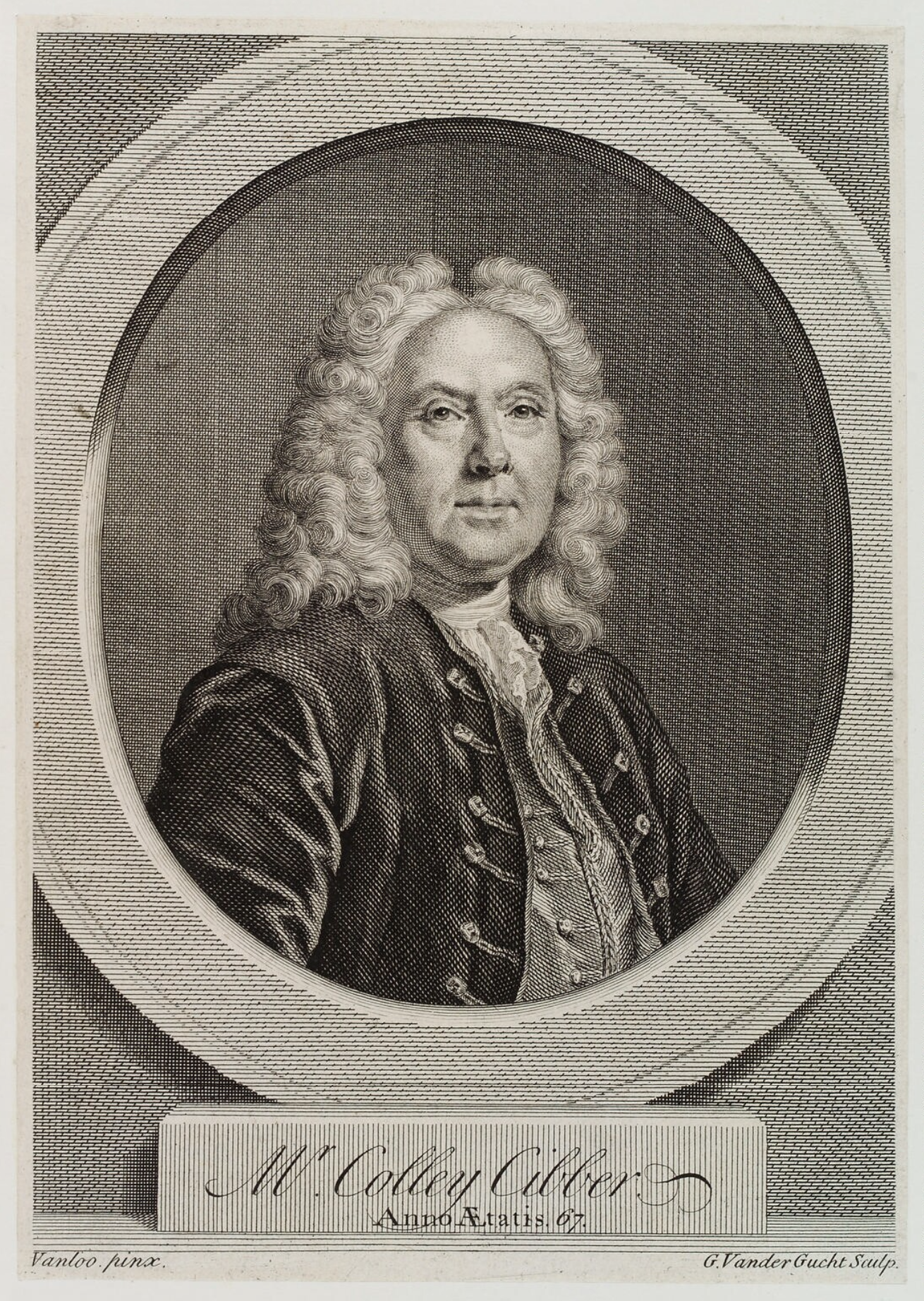
Playwright and Poet Laureate Colley Cibber, the first actor-manager

The theatre's first major success was a 1729 production of a play by Samuel Johnson of Cheshire, Hurlothrumbo, or The Supernatural, which ran for 30 nights – not as long as John Gay's The Beggar's Opera (62 performances), but still a long run for the time. In 1730, the theatre was taken over by an English company. Among the actors who appeared there before 1737 when the theatre was closed under the Licensing Act 1737 were Aaron Hill, Theophilus Cibber, and Henry Fielding. In the eight to ten years before the act was passed, the Haymarket was an alternative to John Rich's Theatre Royal, Covent Garden and the opera-dominated Drury Lane Theatre. Fielding himself was responsible for the instigation of the act, having produced a play called The Historical Register that parodied prime minister Robert Walpole, as the caricature, Quidam.

In particular, it was an alternative to the pantomime and special-effects dominated stages, and it presented opposition (Tory party) satire. Henry Fielding staged his plays at the Haymarket, and so did Henry Carey. Hurlothrumbo was just one of his plays in that series of anti-Walpolean satires, followed by Tom Thumb. Another, in 1734, was his mock-opera, The Dragon of Wantley, with music by John Frederick Lampe. This work punctured the vacuous operatic conventions and pointed a satirical barb at Walpole and his taxation policies. The piece was a huge success, with a record-setting run of 69 performances in its first season. The work debuted at the Haymarket Theatre, where its coded attack on Walpole would have been clear, but its long run occurred after it moved to Covent Garden, which had a much greater capacity for staging. The burlesque itself is very brief on the page, as it relied extensively on absurd theatrics, dances, and other non-textual entertainments. The Musical Entertainer from 1739 contains engravings showing how the staging was performed.

Carey continued with Pasquin and others. Additionally, refugees from Drury Lane's and Covent Garden's internal struggles would show up at the Haymarket, and thus Charlotte Charke would act there in a parody of her father, Colley Cibber, one of the owners and managers of Drury Lane. The Licensing Act 1737, however, put an end to the anti-ministry satires, and it all but entirely shut down the theatre. From 1741 to 1747, Charles Macklin, Cibber, Samuel Foote, and others sometimes produced plays there either by use of a temporary licence or by subterfuge; one advertisement runs, "At Cibber's Academy in the Haymarket, will be a Concert, after which, will be exhibited (gratis) a Rehearsal, in the form of a Play, called Romeo and Juliet."

In 1749 a hoaxer billed as The Bottle Conjuror was advertised to appear at the theatre. The conjuror's publicity claimed that, while on stage, he would place his body inside an empty wine bottle, in full view of the audience. When the advertised act failed to appear on stage, the audience rioted and gutted the theatre. Although the identity of the hoax's perpetrator is unknown, several authors consider John Montagu, 2nd Duke of Montagu, to have been responsible.

=== London's third patent theatre ===
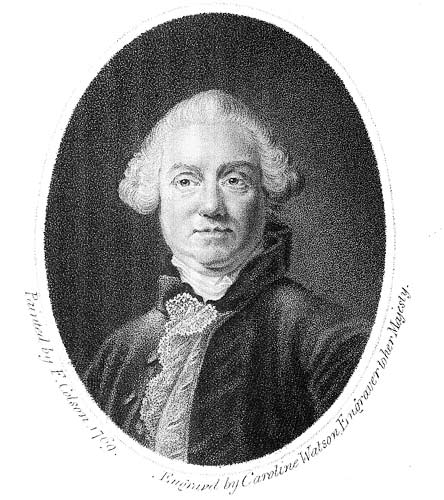
Samuel Foote

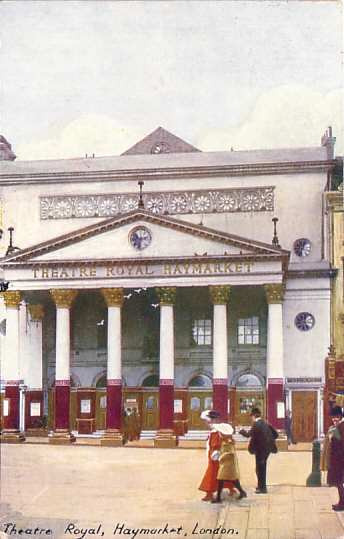
Haymarket Theatre, ca. 1900

In 1754, John Potter, who had been rated (i.e. paid property tax) for the theatre since its opening, was succeeded by John Whitehead. In 1758 Theophilus Cibber obtained from William Howard, then the Lord Chamberlain, a general licence under which Foote tried to establish the Haymarket as a regular theatre. With the aid of the Duke of York he procured a royal licence to exhibit plays during four months in each year from May to September during his lifetime. He also bought the lease of the theatre from Potter's executors and, having added to the site by purchasing adjoining property, he enlarged and improved the building which he opened on 14 May 1767, as the Theatre Royal, the third patent theatre in London. Several successful seasons followed, with Foote producing numerous plays at the theatre, but Foote finally got himself into difficulties by his custom of caricaturing well-known persons on the stage and this, combined with increasing ill-health, resulted in his selling both the theatre and patent to George Colman Sr. on 16 January 1777.

During the season of 1793–94 when Drury Lane Theatre was being rebuilt, the Haymarket was opened under the Drury Lane Patent. The season was notable for a 'Dreadful Accident' which occurred on 3 February 1794, 'when Twenty Persons unfortunately lost their lives, and a great Number were dreadfully bruised owing to a great Crowd pressing to see his Majesty, who was that Evening present at the Performance.' Amongst the dead were John Charles Brooke, Somerset Herald and Benjamin Pingo York Herald. Colman died in 1794, and the theatre descended to his son. George Colman Jr., though successful both as playwright and manager, dissipated his gains by his extravagance. For a time he lived in a room at the back of the theatre and he was finally forced to sell shares in the latter to his brother-in-law, David Morris. Monetary difficulties increased and for a while Colman managed the theatre from the King's Bench Prison, where he was confined for debt.

All the buildings on the east of the Haymarket from the theatre southward were rebuilt circa 1820 in connection with John Nash's schemes for the improvement of the neighbourhood. Nash persuaded the proprietors of the theatre to rebuild on a site a little south of the old one so that the portico should close the vista from Charles Street. The main front feature of Nash's elevation in the Haymarket was (and is) a pedimented portico of six Corinthian columns which extends in depth to the edge of the pavement and includes the whole frontage. It is sometimes stated that Nash rebuilt the theatre entirely, but there is evidence that he incorporated a house in Little Suffolk Street with the theatre, removed two shops which were in front, in the Haymarket, built a portico, increased the number of avenues and added a second gallery to the existing auditorium.

A lease dated 10 June 1821, was granted to David Edward Morris. The theatre was opened on 4 July 1821, with The Rivals. Benjamin Nottingham Webster became the theatre's manager from 1837 to 1853. He and his successor, John Baldwin Buckstone, established the theatre as a great comedy house, and the theatre hosted most of the great actors of the period. The illusionist Ching Lau Lauro performed here on 25 July 1827.

=== The latter half of the 19th century ===
In 1862, the theatre was host to a 400-night run of Our American Cousin, with Edward Sothern as Lord Dundreary. The play's success brought the word "dreary" into common use. Robertson's David Garrick was a hit in 1864, also with Sothern in the title role. Sothern also starred in H. J. Byron's An English Gentleman at the theatre in 1871. W. S. Gilbert premiered seven of his plays at the Haymarket. The first was his early burlesque, Robinson Crusoe; or, The Injun Bride and the Injured Wife (1867, written with Byron, Tom Hood, H. S. Leigh and Arthur Sketchley). Gilbert followed this with a number of his blank verse "fairy comedies", the first of which was The Palace of Truth (1870), produced by Buckstone. These starred William Hunter Kendal and his wife Madge Robertson Kendal and also included Pygmalion and Galatea (1871), and The Wicked World (1873). Gilbert also produced here his dramas, Charity (1874), Dan'l Druce, Blacksmith (1876), and his most famous play outside of his Savoy operas, Engaged, an 1877 farce. Buckstone's ghost has reportedly often been seen at the theatre, particularly during comedies and "when he appreciates things" playing there. In 2009, The Daily Telegraph reported that the actor Patrick Stewart saw the ghost standing in the wings during a performance of Waiting for Godot at the Haymarket. In May 1875, Arthur Sullivan's The Zoo transferred to the Haymarket.

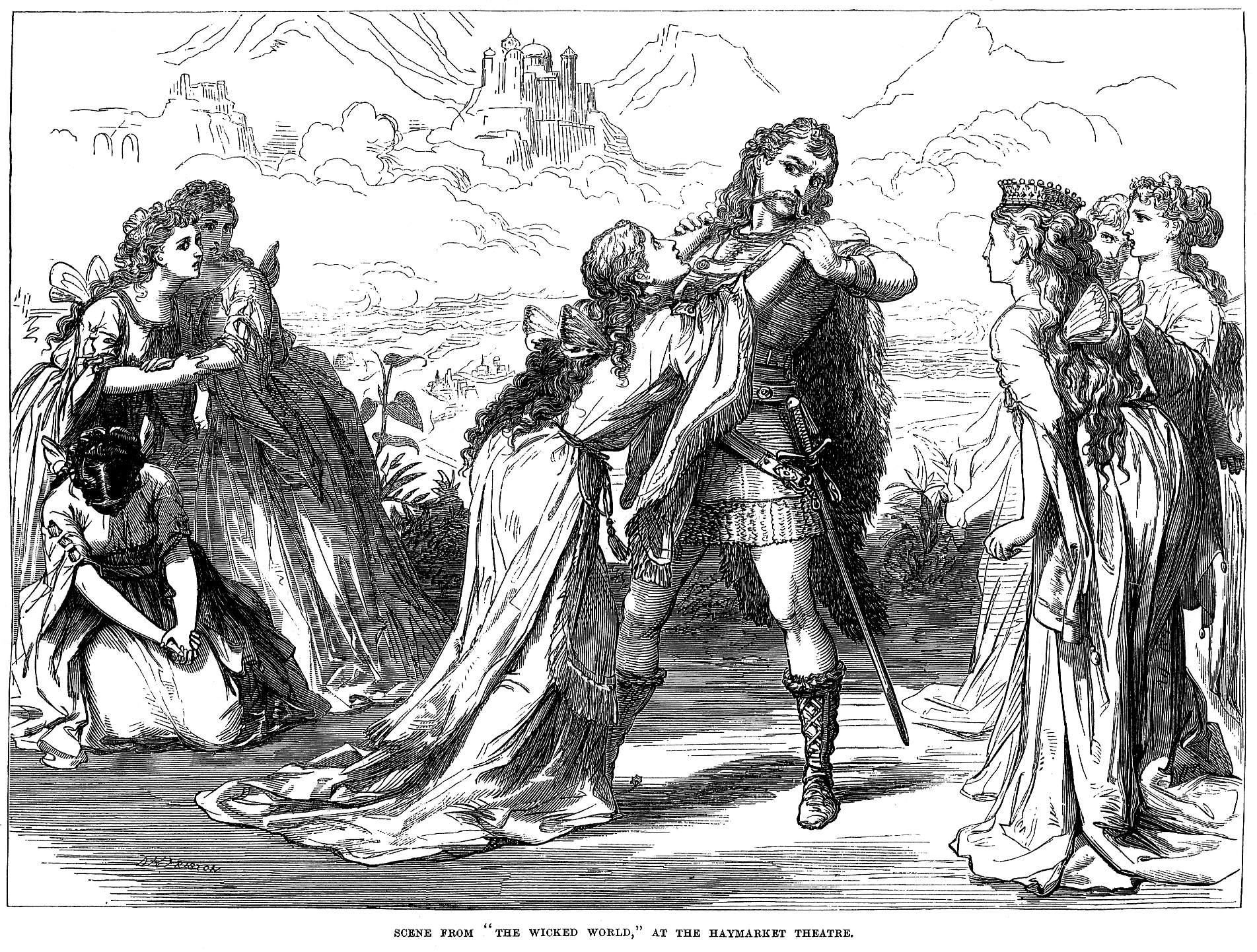
Scene from The Wicked World in The Illustrated London News, 8 February 1873

In 1879 the house was taken over by the Bancrofts, who re-opened the theatre with a revival of Edward Bulwer-Lytton's Money, followed by Victorien Sardou's Odette (for which they engaged Madame Helena Modjeska) and Fedora, and Arthur Wing Pinero's Lords and Commons, with other revivals of previous successes. The auditorium had been reconstructed, and the stage enclosed in a complete picture frame proscenium, the first in London. The abolition of the pit by the introduction of stalls seating divided by plain iron arms caused the opening night play, Money, on 31 January 1880, to be delayed for half an hour while the audience in the galleries expressed their anger. Mr. Bancroft, in the character of Sir Frederick Blount, vainly endeavoured to pacify them, until he bluntly asked whether the play should proceed and thus obtained silence. The Bancrofts gave up management of the theatre in 1885.

The next season opened in September 1885. Herbert Beerbohm Tree became manager of the theatre and, in 1887, transferred The Red Lamp there from the Comedy Theatre; by then he had installed electric light in the theatre. Under Tree's management, Oscar Wilde premiered his comedy A Woman of No Importance in April 1893. In January 1895 Wilde's An Ideal Husband was first performed at the theatre. Tree's next notable hit was George du Maurier's Trilby, later in 1895. This ran for over 260 performances and made such profits that Tree was able to build Her Majesty's Theatre and establish RADA.

In 1896 Cyril Maude and Frederick Harrison became lessees, opening with Under the Red Robe, an adaptation of Stanley Wyman's novel. In 1897 The Little Minister by J. M. Barrie ran for 320 performances.

=== The 20th century ===
==== 1900 to 1950 ====
The Haymarket's managers Frederick Harrison (who was sole lessee) and Cyril Maude remained through the first year of the 20th century. In 1904, the auditorium was redesigned in Louis XVI style by C. Stanley Peach. The following year, Maude acquired the Playhouse Theatre by Charing Cross Station, leaving Harrison in sole control. In 1909, Herbert Trench produced Maurice Maeterlinck's The Blue Bird. Productions from then to the end of World War I included Bunty Pulls the Strings (1911), a Scottish comedy by Graham Moffat, which ran for 617 performances with Jimmy Finlayson in the lead; Ibsen's Ghosts (1914); Elegant Edward, with Henry Daniell as P. C. Hodson (1915); The Widow's Might (1916), a comedy by Leonard Huskinson and Christopher Sandeman, with Henry Daniell. and General Post, a comedy by J. E. Harold Terry, which opened on 14 March 1917 and ran for 532 performances, again with Daniell.

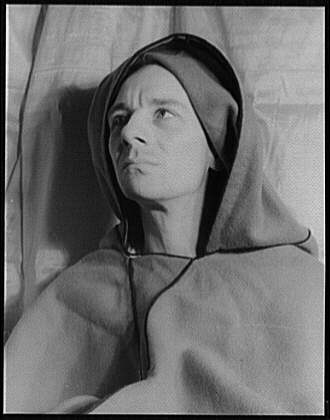
John Gielgud in 1936

In 1920, J. M. Barrie's Mary Rose had a run of 399 performances. Another long-running production was Yellow Sands, in which Ralph Richardson gave 610 performances in 1926–27. In 1926 Harrison died, and Horace Watson became the theatre's General Manager. His presentations included 632 performances of The First Mrs Fraser, by St. John Ervine, starring Marie Tempest in 1929. In 1939, under Watson's management, work began on excavating a stalls bar, but it was not completed until 1941 owing to the outbreak of World War II. Wartime presentations included the London premiere of Noël Coward's Design for Living (1939) and John Gielgud's 1944–1945 repertory season of The Circle (Somerset Maugham), Love for Love (Congreve), Hamlet, A Midsummer Night's Dream and The Duchess of Malfi.

In 1940, Gielgud directed The Beggar's Opera, with Michael Redgrave as Macheath. In 1943, two Coward plays, Present Laughter and This Happy Breed, alternated. They were followed in 1945 by Wilde's Lady Windermere's Fan and in 1948 by Tennessee Williams's The Glass Menagerie directed by Gielgud, starring Helen Hayes; and The Heiress, an adaptation of Henry James's Washington Square, directed by Gielgud and starring Ralph Richardson and Peggy Ashcroft, who were succeeded by Godfrey Tearle and Wendy Hiller (1949–50).

==== 1950–80 ====
In 1951–52 Waters of the Moon by N. C. Hunter starred Sybil Thorndike, Edith Evans and Wendy Hiller. For the Coronation season in 1953, Coward gave a rare performance in a play not written by him, The Apple Cart by George Bernard Shaw, with Margaret Leighton as his co-star. To Coward, the Haymarket was "the most perfect theatre in the world". In 1956, Stuart Watson, who had taken over management of the theatre from his father Horace, died and was succeeded by his son Anthony, and then his daughter-in-law Sylva Stuart Watson, who took over in 1963. Productions under the new management included Flowering Cherry by Robert Bolt (1957) starring Ralph Richardson and Celia Johnson; Ross by Terence Rattigan (1960) starring Alec Guinness; and John Gielgud's production of The School for Scandal (1962), with Ralph Richardson and Margaret Rutherford. In the 1960s, notable presentations included The Tulip Bee by N. C. Hunter starring Celia Johnson and John Clements and Thornton Wilder's Ides of March directed by Gielgud (both 1963).

In 1971, Louis I. Michaels became the lessee of the theatre. Productions of the decade included a revival of Enid Bagnold's The Chalk Garden, with Gladys Cooper (1971, which had played at the Haymarket in 1956–57); the long-running A Voyage Round My Father (John Mortimer) starring Alec Guinness, succeeded by Michael Redgrave (1971–72); and, in 1972, Crown Matrimonial by Royce Ryton, starring Wendy Hiller as Queen Mary. Later productions included a revival of On Approval (Frederick Lonsdale) with Geraldine McEwan and Edward Woodward (1975); The Circle, with Googie Withers and John McCallum (1976); Rosmersholm (Ibsen) with Claire Bloom and Daniel Massey (1977); The Millionairess (Shaw), with Penelope Keith; Waters of the Moon again, starring Hiller and Ingrid Bergman in her last stage role (both 1978); and Keith Michell and Susan Hampshire in The Crucifer of Blood (1979).

==== 1980–2000 ====
The theatre then presented Make and Break (Michael Frayn), with Leonard Rossiter and Prunella Scales (1980). The following year, Louis Michaels died, and the theatre passed to a company, Louis I Michaels Ltd, with President, Enid Chanelle and Chairman, Arnold M Crook, which continued to own the theatre for decades. They presented Overheard, by Peter Ustinov; and Virginia, with Maggie Smith (1981). In 1982, the Haymarket staged a repertory season including Hobson's Choice, starring Penelope Keith; Captain Brassbound's Conversion (Shaw); Uncle Vanya (Chekhov); Rules of the Game (Luigi Pirandello); and Man and Superman (Shaw), starring Peter O'Toole. In 1983, productions included The School for Scandal, starring Donald Sinden; Heartbreak House (Shaw), starring Rex Harrison; Ben Kingsley in a one-man show about Edmund Kean; A Patriot for Me (John Osborne); The Cherry Orchard (Chekhov); and The Sleeping Prince (Terence Rattigan).

Productions in 1984 were The Aspern Papers by Henry James, starring Christopher Reeve, Vanessa Redgrave and Wendy Hiller; Aren't We All? (Frederick Lonsdale) starring Rex Harrison and Claudette Colbert; and The Way of the World (Congreve). In 1985, Lauren Bacall starred in Sweet Bird of Youth (Tennessee Williams), followed by Harold Pinter's Old Times. In 1986 the theatre presented Antony and Cleopatra, starring Timothy Dalton and Vanessa Redgrave; Breaking the Code (Hugh Whitemore), starring Derek Jacobi as Alan Turing; Long Day's Journey into Night, starring Jack Lemmon; and The Apple Cart, starring Peter O'Toole. In 1988, another Tennessee Williams play, Orpheus Descending, starred Vanessa Redgrave. Later productions that year were You Never Can Tell (Shaw); The Deep Blue Sea (Rattigan); and The Admirable Crichton (J. M. Barrie). The 1980s ended at the Haymarket with Veterans' Day (Donald Freed) and A Life in the Theatre (David Mamet). In 1990, the Haymarket revived London Assurance (Dion Boucicault) and presented An Evening with Peter Ustinov. The next year's plays included Jean Anouilh's Becket, starring Derek Jacobi and Robert Lindsay. Lindsay also starred in a revival of Cyrano de Bergerac in 1992. This was succeeded by new productions of Heartbreak House with Vanessa Redgrave and A Woman of No Importance.

In 1994 the theatre closed for a £1.3 million refurbishment, re-opening later that year with a revival of An Evening with Peter Ustinov, followed by Arcadia (Tom Stoppard). Burning Blue (1995), a new play by the first time playwright David Greer, was followed by the veteran director Peter Hall's revival of Ibsen's The Master Builder, starring Alan Bates. Hall also directed the 1996 An Ideal Husband (Oscar Wilde) 100 years after its première at the Haymarket; the new production featured Martin Shaw as Lord Goring. There is a memorial plaque to Wilde at the theatre.

Another production of 1996 was Neil Simon's The Odd Couple, starring Tony Randall and Jack Klugman. Hall was in charge again for the 1997 production of A Streetcar Named Desire (Tennessee Williams), starring Jessica Lange; Lady Windermere's Fan; and An Ideal Husband (returning after touring). The last production of that year was A Delicate Balance (Edward Albee), starring Eileen Atkins, Maggie Smith, John Standing and Annette Crosbie.

In 1998, Shakespeare's Villains a one-man play, created and performed by Steven Berkoff at the theatre was nominated for a Laurence Olivier Award for Best Entertainment. Later that year, Tom Stoppard's The Invention of Love, starring John Wood, played. In 1999, Fascinating Aïda's comic revue was followed by Neil Simon's The Prisoner of Second Avenue, with Richard Dreyfuss and Marsha Mason; Love Letters, by A. R. Gurney, with Charlton Heston and The Importance of Being Earnest, starring Patricia Routledge.

=== The 21st century ===
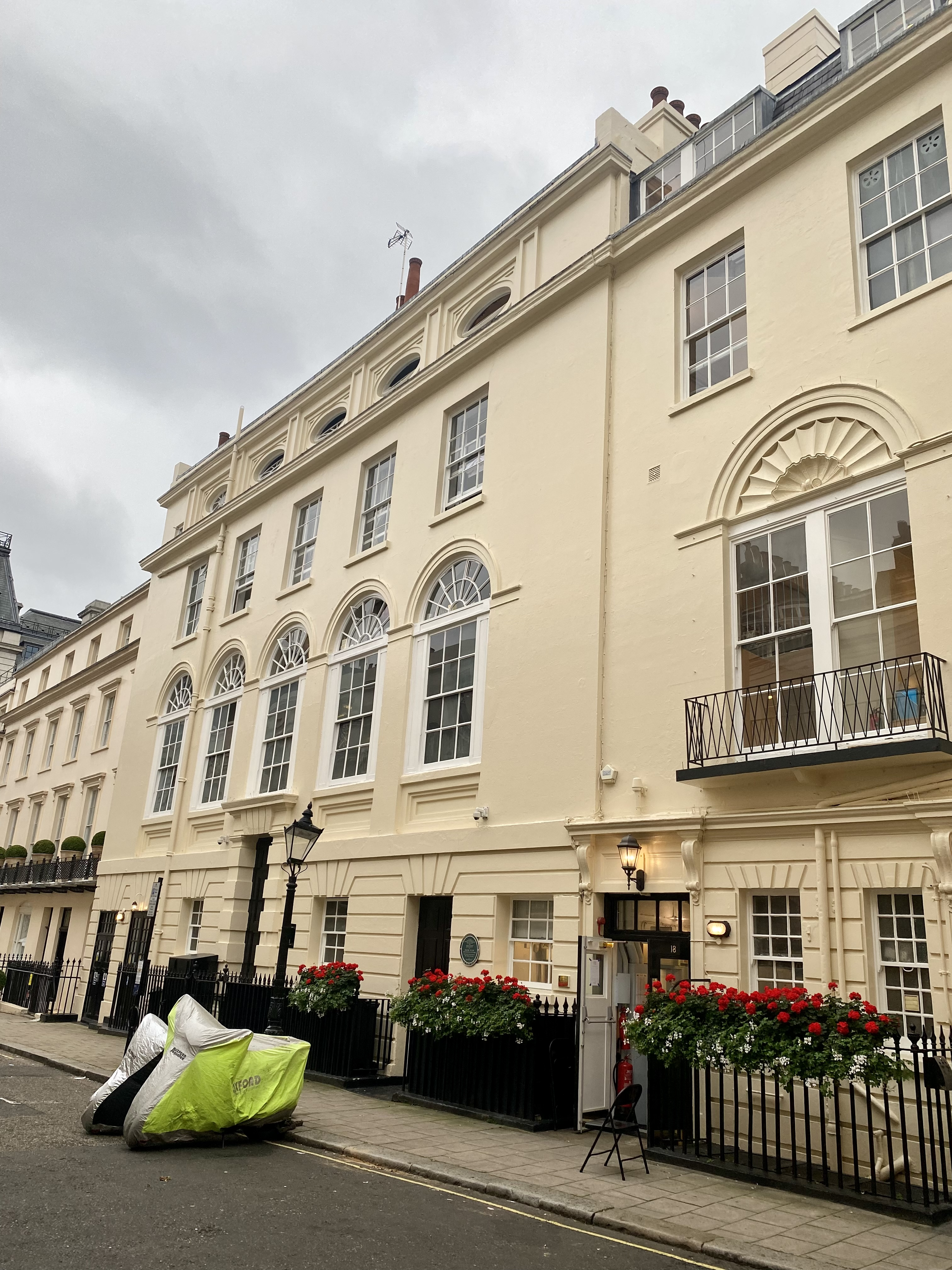
The rear of the theatre in Suffolk Street

Productions at the Haymarket in this century have included The Royal Family by Edna Ferber, starring Judi Dench (2001), Lady Windermere's Fan, directed by Peter Hall, starring Vanessa Redgrave and Joely Richardson (2002), and Dench appeared on stage together with Maggie Smith for the first time in over 40 years in The Breath of Life by David Hare (2002). Productions in 2003 included Ibsen's Brand, directed by Adrian Noble, starring Ralph Fiennes and A Woman of No Importance, with Rupert Graves, Samantha Bond and Prunella Scales, also directed by Noble. In 2004, the theatre presented a stage adaptation of the film, When Harry Met Sally..., starring Luke Perry and Alyson Hannigan, during which the house closed for two nights after bits of the ceiling fell during a performance injuring fifteen people.

2005 productions included Victoria Wood's Acorn Antiques: The Musical, starring Julie Walters, Celia Imrie and Duncan Preston, directed by Trevor Nunn and A Few Good Men, starring Rob Lowe, Suranne Jones and Jack Ellis. 2006 featured three revivals: A Man for All Seasons, starring Martin Shaw; Coward's Hay Fever, with Judi Dench and Peter Bowles; and Seven Brides for Seven Brothers, starring Dave Willetts and Shona Lindsay. The last production of that year was Six Dance Lessons in Six Weeks, starring Claire Bloom and Billy Zane. The first production of 2007 was Pinter's People, a compilation of Harold Pinter sketches of the past 40 years; later productions of that year were The Lady from Dubuque (Albee), starring Maggie Smith; David Suchet in The Last Confession; and The Country Wife, starring Toby Stephens, Patricia Hodge and David Haig.

In 2008, productions were The Sea (Bond), starring David Haig, Eileen Atkins and Russell Tovey; Marguerite, a new musical starring Ruthie Henshall and Alexander Hanson; and Keith Allen in an adaptation of Treasure Island. The following year, Ian McKellen, Patrick Stewart, Simon Callow and Ronald Pickup starred in Waiting for Godot, followed by Breakfast at Tiffany's, starring Anna Friel, Joseph Cross, James Dreyfus and Suzanne Bertish. Godot and Tiffany's were featured, along with the staff and history of the Haymarket Theatre itself, in a 2009 eight-part Sky Arts documentary, Theatreland. In 2010 Waiting for Godot was repeated with McKellen, Roger Rees, Matthew Kelly and Pickup, followed by Sweet Charity. The next show was The Rivals starring Penelope Keith and Peter Bowles.

Trevor Nunn became Artistic Director 2011, producing a revival of Flare Path, as part of the playwright Terence Rattigan's centenary year celebrations, starring Sienna Miller, James Purefoy and Sheridan Smith; the Chichester Festival Theatre's revival of Rosencrantz and Guildenstern Are Dead by Tom Stoppard; Ralph Fiennes as Prospero in The Tempest; and, over the Christmas/New Year season, Robert Lindsay and Joanna Lumley in The Lion in Winter. For two years from March 2012, the Haymarket hosted One Man, Two Guvnors. The theatre was one of the 40 theatres featured in the 2012 DVD documentary series Great West End Theatres, presented by Donald Sinden.

In 2014, a stage adaptation of the film Fatal Attraction, directed by Nunn, premiered at the theatre, and Maureen Lipman and Harry Shearer starred in Daytona. The following year Penelope Wilton starred in Taken at Midnight. This was followed by Harvey, starring James Dreyfus and Maureen Lipman, and The Elephant Man, starring Bradley Cooper. McQueen, starring Stephen Wight, then played, followed by Mr Foote's Other Leg, starring Simon Russell Beale as Samuel Foote.

Productions in 2016 included a revival of Alan Ayckbourn's How the Other Half Loves, starring Nicholas Le Prevost, Jenny Seagrove, Tamzin Outhwaite and Jason Merrells, and Pixie Lott made her debut at the Haymarket as Holly Golightly in Breakfast at Tiffany's. In December the Royal Shakespeare Company took up residence at the Haymarket with a double bill of Love's Labour's Lost and Much Ado About Nothing. In 2017, Damian Lewis and Sophie Okonedo starred in Edward Albee's The Goat, or Who Is Sylvia? from March to June. The RSC then returned to the theatre with Queen Anne. Natalie Dormer and David Oakes later starred in Venus in Fur.

In 2018, Suranne Jones, Jason Watkins and Nina Sosanya starred in a revival of Frozen, a play by Bryony Lavery, followed by Heathers: The Musical starring Carrie Hope Fletcher. In 2019 Louis I. Michaels Ltd. sold the theatre to Access Entertainment for a reported £45 million. In February 2019, Only Fools and Horses The Musical premiered at the theatre. It closed at the end of April 2023 after over 1,000 performances, making it the longest-running show in the Haymarket's history, and was followed by a limited run of Accidental Death of an Anarchist starring Daniel Rigby. Noises Off starring Felicity Kendal began a limited run in September 2023.The Picture of Dorian Gray starring Sarah Snook followed in February 2024. A View from the Bridge starring Dominic West began playing in May 2024. It was followed by Waiting for Godot starring Lucian Msamati and Ben Whishaw from September to December 2024.

In 2025 the theatre hosted Bill Bailey - Thoughtifier. Brian Cox starred as Johann Sebastian Bach in The Score, a new play by Oliver Cotton and Tamsin Greig starred in a revival of Rattigan's The Deep Blue Sea. These were followed by a new production of Othello, starring David Harewood in the title role, with Toby Jones as Iago and Caitlin FitzGerald as Desdemona. In 2026 the musical The Unlikely Pilgrimage of Harold Fry played, followed by Grace Pervades by David Hare, starring Ralph Fiennes and Miranda Raison.

== Masterclass ==
In 1998 the theatre founded Masterclass, a charity that offers creative opportunities and performing experiences to young people pursuing careers in the performing arts. Its activities include, in addition to masterclasses, apprenticeships in directing and theatre design, workshop productions, and theatre career fairs. The masterclasses cover a range of disciplines, from acting and directing to writing, producing and design, and give young people the chance to learn directly from leading practitioners working in theatre, film and television. As of 2012, more than 60,000 young people between the ages of 17 and 30 had participated in the masterclasses.
