= Dick's Coffee House =

Irish coffeehouse

Dick's Coffee House was a significant Irish coffeehouse in the 17th and 18th century.

Dick's was one of Dublin's most famous and long-lasting coffeehouses, established by Richard Pue in the late 17th century, at some point before July 1698. Pue was a bookseller and owned one of Ireland's earliest newspapers, Pue's Occurrences. Dick's was housed in Skinner's Row (now Christchurch Place), on the drawing room floor of Carberry House, which had previously been the home of the Earl of Kildare. In February 1708, Joseph Walker, a Dublin goldsmith, bought the site for the considerable sum of £1,010. In the property deeds, it was described as "the house formerly known or called by the name of Carbery (sic) House and now divided into Two or more Houses or Tenements...". (Note: Registry of Deeds, Dublin. Memorial: 1-495-385. Registered 05/04/1709. A Memoriall of a Deed of Conveyance to be Registred Pursuant to an Act of Parliament made in Ireland in the Sixth Year of the Reign of our Sovereign Lady Queen Anne [..] All that the House in Skinnerrow (Skinner Row) formerly known or called by the name of Carbery House and now divided into Two or more Houses or Tenements and formerly held by Richard Malone, James Malone and James Crompton...) From the same deed it is also gleaned that the building was "formerly held" by people named Richard Malone, James Malone and James Crompton.

The London bookseller, John Dunton, held auctions in Dick's in 1698. Pue ran his printing workshop from the same premises, printing for a number of Dublin publishing houses. Thomas Bacon held auctions in Dick's from the 1760s, and printed his paper the Dublin Gazette from there for a time. Land and property auctions were also held from Dick's from the 1720s. (Note: Registry of Deeds, Dublin. Memorial: 91-258-64196. Registered 21/07/1738. A Memorial of Deeds of Lease and Release Indented bearing date respectively the Twentieth and Twenty-first days of July Ann Dom one thousand seven hundred and thirty-eight [..] reciting that the said Trustees set up the said premisses among severall other lands and premises to Sale by Publick Cant at Dicks Coffee House in Skinner Row, Dublin, and that the said William Sumner became the highest bidder...)

The customers of Dick's were described in 1740: "Ye citizens, gentlemen, lawyers and squires, Who summer and winter surround our great fires, Ye quidnuncs! who frequently come into Pue's, To live upon politicks, coffee, and news."

After Richard Pue's death in 1722, his wife Elizabeth ran the coffee house and printing business, which in turn their son Richard Pue (Junior) took over from her by 1731. The business then passed to Richard's nephew, James Pue and his wife Sarah. The printer and bookseller, Sarah Cotter, operated from the coffee house from 1751 to 1774, taking over from her brother who worked from there from 1744 until his death in 1751.

In a deed dating from August 1757, a Gentleman named Matthew Walker (who was previously employed as a goldsmith (Note: Registry of Deeds, Dublin. Memorial: 48-156-31192. Registered 10/03/1725 (Julian Calendar). A Memoriall of a Deed of Settlement by way of Lease and Release indented beareing (sic) Date respectively the First and Second Days of October 1725 [..] the Lease made between Matthew Walker of the City of Dublin, Goldsmith of the one part and Isaac Dobson of the same City, Esquire [..] in Consideration of a Marriage to be had and Solemnized between the said Matthew Walker and Mable Anyon [..] did Grant, bargain, sell, alien, release and confirm unto the said Isaac Dobson and John Walker and to their heirs and assigns forever all that the house in Skinner Row formerly known and called by the name of Carbery house and now divided into two or more houses...) and possibly a son of the aforementioned Joseph Walker) 'released and confirmed' unto a woman named Martha Kane an area of ground south of Skinner Row (and adjacent to Souter's Lane) which had formerly been in the possession of Sarah Cotter, Robert Glanville and Richard Pue (Jnr), amongst others. The property was bounded on the north, partly by the back yard of Carberry House, and partly by an establishment named the 'Ram Ale House'. (Note: Registry of Deeds, Dublin. Memorial: 189-280-125468. Registered 20/08/1757. A Memorial of an Indented Deed of release [..] between William Palmer of the City of Dublin, Esquire & Edward Buller of the said City, Gentleman, Devisees and Executors of Michael Boyton of the City of Dublin, Feltmaker, deceased, of the one part, Mathew Walker of the said City, Gentleman, of the Second part and Martha Kane of the said City, Spinster of the third part [..] did release and confirm unto the said Martha Kane all those two parcells of Souters Lane situate lying and being on the Back part of the southside of Skinner Row in the County of the City of Dublin containing 63 feet in length [..] bounded on the East with the late Alderman French’s holding and Souters Lane, on the South with ground formerly in the possession of Richard Geering, Esquire, on the West by a Passage or Entry leading to the City Wall & on the North partly by the back yard of Carbery House and Partly by the ram ale House...) It is known that there was a lane named "Ram Alley" in the vicinity, and the name of the ale house may have derived from this.

The coffee house closed around 1780 when Carberry House was demolished.

== See also ==
- English coffeehouses in the 17th and 18th centuries
- Bewley's
