= Samuel Bewley =

Irish businessman (1764–1837)

- Born: 21 April 1764; Mountmellick, County Laois
- Died: 8 November 1837 (aged 73); Rockville, County Dublin
- Known for: founder of Bewley's

Samuel Bewley (21 April 1764 – 8 November 1837) was an Irish businessman, silk merchant and philanthropist. Along with his son Charles, he founded the company Bewley's.

== Life ==
Samuel Bewley was born in Mountmellick, County Laois on 21 April 1764. His parents were Thomas (1719–95) and Susanna Bewley (née Pim). The family were Quakers. Bewley married Elizabeth Fayle, with whom he had 3 daughters, and 10 sons. He lived at Meath Street, William Street and Rockville, County Dublin. He died on 8 November 1837.

== Career ==
Bewley was most likely an apprentice to a Dublin silk merchant, before establishing his own silk merchant business. He worked with his brother, John (1754–1830), in cotton manufacture from 1796 to around 1804. From 1826, Bewley was a ship owner, trading with Barbados, the Levant, and North America from where he imported dye stuffs and drugs including liquorice paste, opium, silkworm gut, and valonia. From 1820, Bewley was involved in the revival of the Dublin Chamber of Commerce, serving as a council member and treasurer from 1820 to 1837. He drafted numerous reports from the chamber, and was seen as a unifying member of the council. Bewley represented the chamber at a number of parliamentary committees, such as the fourth commission of inquiry into the revenue arising in Ireland in 1822.

Bewley was involved with the legislation which allowed Irish merchants to import tea directly to Ireland, after the ending of the monopoly held by the East India Company. Hellas, Bewley's ship, was the first to freight between China and Dublin directly in 1835. It was with the cargo of over 2,000 crates of tea that Bewley and his son Charles founded the company Bewley's. In 1822, he was a founding shareholder of the National Insurance Company, serving as one of the 3 treasurers between 1822 and 1824. He was a director and major shareholder of the Mining Company of Ireland.

== Philanthropy ==
Bewley was an elder of the Society of Friends, which led him to be active in its administration and to serve as treasurer on the relief committee for Quakers who lost property in the 1798 Rising. He also served on the Dublin Tract Association committee. Bewley proposed the foundation of a Quaker retreat at Bloomfield, Dublin in 1807. This institution was the first in Ireland to offer gentle treatment for mental illness. He was also involved in the Hibernian Society for Promotion of Permanent and Universal Peace, the Cork Street Fever Hospital, the Sick Poor Institution, and the Meath Hospital. in 1823, he served as treasurer of the Dublin Committee for the Greek Refugees from the Isle of Scio, and was a subscribing member of the committee for raising funds for African instruction in 1824. For his arbitration skills, Bewley was dubbed "Solomon of the quakers", working closely with the La Touche and Guinness families, who were Anglican. Together they founded the non-sectarian Kildare Place schools in 1811, and the Dublin Savings Bank in 1818. He was a founding member of the Association for the Prevention and Suppression of Mendicity in 1818.
