= John Preston (alderman) =

Former mayor of Dublin, Ireland in 1653–54

John Preston (1611–1686), born at Tara, Ardsallagh, County Meath, served as Mayor of Dublin in 1653–1654.

He was the son of Hugh Preston (born circa 1585), often said to be of Bolton, Lancashire, grandson of Martin Preston (born circa 1547) and the great-grandson of Jenico Preston, 3rd Viscount Gormanston.

He married Mary Morris (1615–1654) on 21 May 1643 at Bolton, Lancashire, England, with whom he had three children, Mary, Phineas, and Samuel. At some stage he came to Dublin and established himself as a successful merchant in the city.

Following the death of his first wife, he married Katherine Ashburnham, the widow of Sir John Sherlock MP of Littlerath, County Kildare.

He married for a third time another widow, Anne Tighe (1655–1700) the daughter of Alderman Richard Tighe (who also served as Mayor of Dublin), who bore him a son also called John Preston, who served as MP in the Irish Parliament for Meath in 1711–1715 as well as another son Nathaniel who served as an MP for Navan for approximately 40 years.

He was appointed Clerk of the Tholsel in 1650 and two days later he was elected alderman on Dublin Corporation. He served as Mayor of Dublin in 1653-4 and also served as MP for Navan in 1661.

He established his fortune by acquiring 8,000 acres in County Meath and what was then Queen's County or Leix (now County Laois) in 1666. These lands had been confiscated from the Catholic Nangle family who held the title of Baron of Navan and distributed among Cromwell's various adventurers and soldiers who sold on these lands for a low price having not wished to move to Ireland. It is also likely that Preston was connected directly to the Nangle family either through marriage or through his mother.

He founded the Preston Schools in Navan, County Meath and a separate school at Ballyroan, County Laois in 1686. The school at Navan was subsumed by Wilson's Hospital School in 1969.

It is also said that John held land in Dublin which may have been donated for the construction of the Royal Hospital and the Blue Coat School.

He died on 13 July 1686. His land was distributed between his four sons.

His son Nathaniel inherited his lands and estate at Swainstown and later built Swainstown House. His son John inherited the lands at Balsoon and later built Bellinter House after becoming in his own right a successful brewer. His son Phineas inherited Ardsallagh, although Phineas died before his father so it ultimately went to Phineas' son John. His son Samuel inherited land around Emo and Ballyroan, County Laois.

Civic offices
Preceded by Daniel Hutchinson	Mayor of Dublin; 1653–1654	Succeeded by Thomas Hooke
