= Church of St. Nicholas Within, Dublin =

Former church in Dublin, Ireland

Coordinates: 53°20′33.25″N 6°16′17.54″W

St. Nicholas Within
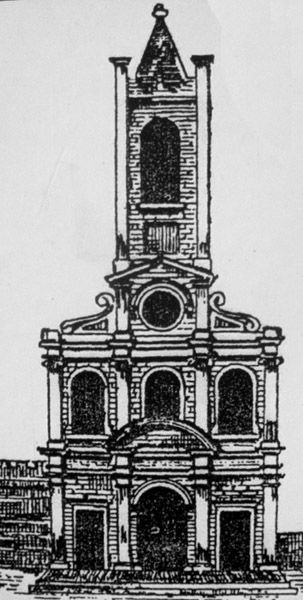
- The church in 1786
- St. Nicholas Within
- Location: Nicholas St./Christ Church Place, Dublin
- Country: Ireland
- Denomination: Church of Ireland

History
- Former name: St. Nicholas
- Founder: Bishop Donat
- Dedication: Saint Nicholas of Myra
- Dedicated: 11th century

Architecture
- Completed: Rebuilt 1707
- Closed: 1867

Administration
- Parish: St. Nicholas Within

St. Nicholas Within is a former Church of Ireland parish church in Dublin city, Ireland. It was located at the corner of Nicholas Street and Christchurch Place, where part of its entrance may be seen next to the Peace Park although this structure was disassembled and rebuilt approximately 10–15 metres back from its original location in 1911 as part of road widening works.

The term may also refer to the civil parish in the barony of Dublin City which was one of nine and a half baronies in the old County Dublin.

== The church ==
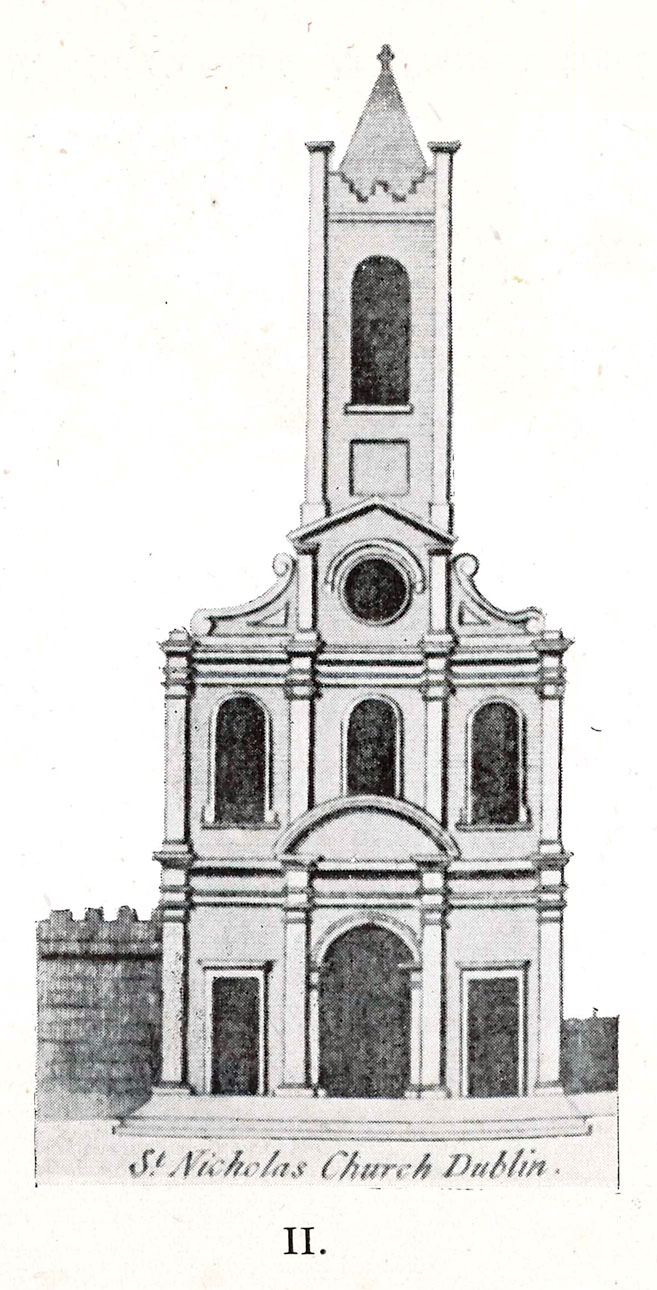
Church of St Nicholas Within, Dublin

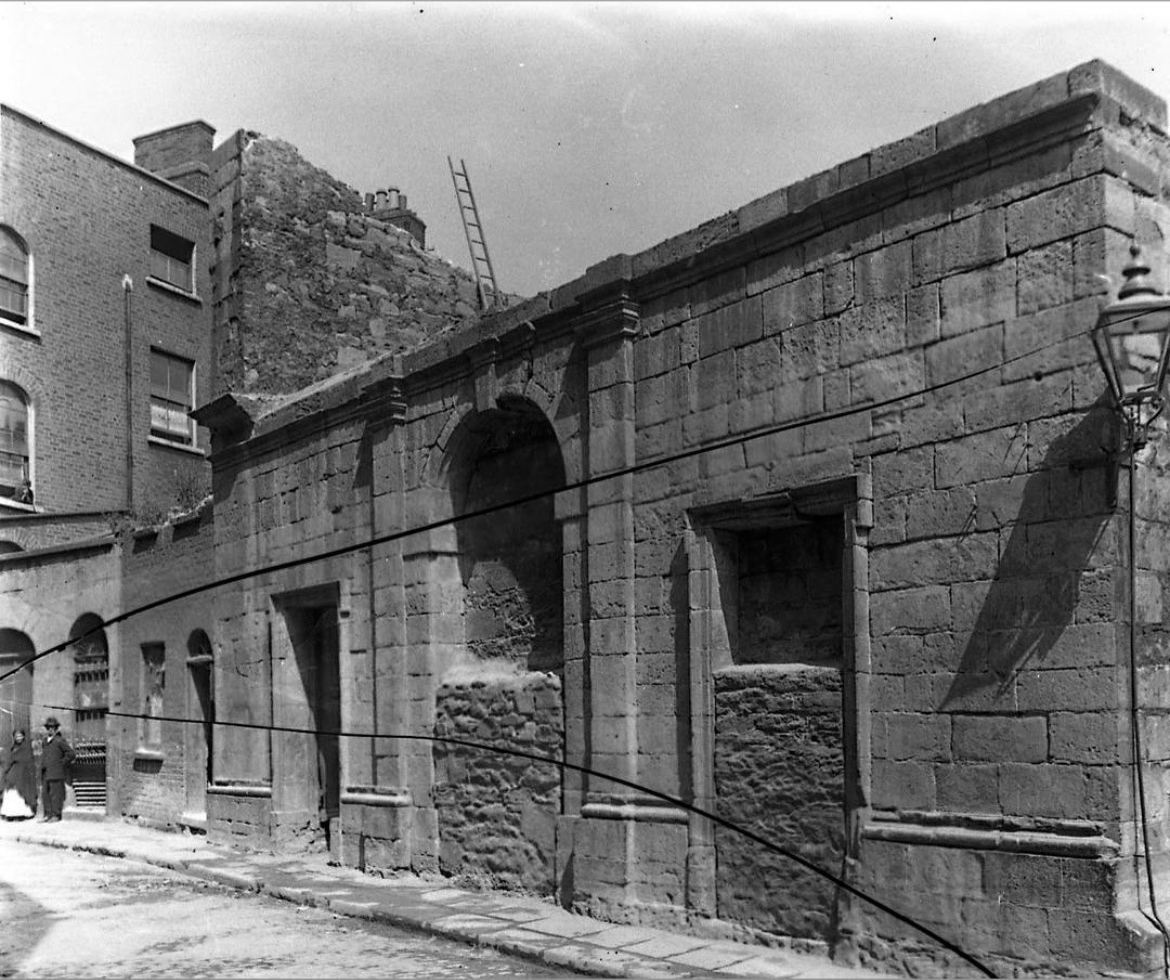
The remains of the church circa 1900.

The original church was built in the 11th century by Bishop Donat and was dedicated to Saint Nicholas of Myra, the patron saint of sailors. It received its name during the episcopate of Alexander de Bicknor (1317–1349), when the parish of St. Nicholas was extended outside the city so as to include the Manor of St. Sepulchre and the Deanery of St Patrick. The parish was divided into two parts: St. Nicholas Within the Walls and St. Nicholas Without.

The church fell into disrepair in the 17th century, and was rebuilt in 1707. By 1835 it was again having problems, and it was unroofed, although a chapel in the church, St. Mary's, continued to be used until 1847. It was planned to demolish the church and build a new one. However, this was never done, and the parish united with that of St. Audoen in 1867.

== The parish ==
The parish is mentioned in Pope Celestine III's Bull of 1191, listing prebends. The parish was the smallest parish in Dublin, measuring 5 acres (20,000 m^{2}), 11 perches. At the time of its unification with St. Audoen's the population of the parish was 1,838, of which only 184 belonged to the established (i.e., Church of Ireland) church. The parish corresponded to the civil parish of the same name.

== The cemetery ==
The greater part of the graveyard was taken over by Dublin Corporation when building the Tholsel nearby. All that remained was a passage to the vaults. The names of those interred are available in the parish registers.

- Nathaniel Catelyn, Speaker of the Irish House of Commons, was buried here in April 1637.
- Alexander Montgomery (1686–1729), soldier and politician from County Donegal, was buried here on 22 December 1729.
- Sir Robert Doyne (1651–1733), former Chief Justice of the Irish Common Pleas, was buried here in 1733.

== Chantry of St. Mary ==
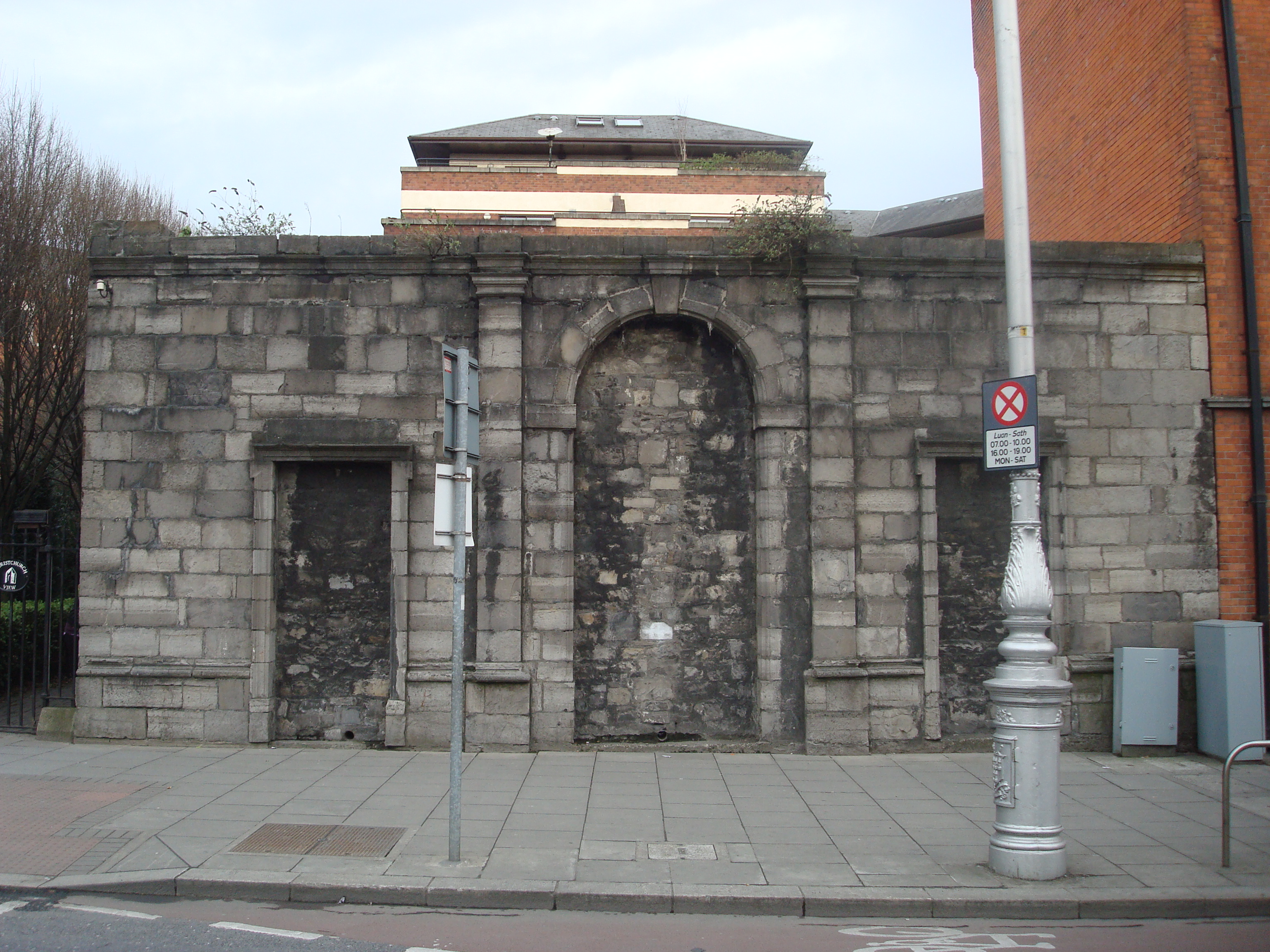
Remains of the entrance to the church.

In 1469, King Edward IV of England gave John Tiptoft, 1st Earl of Worcester permission to found a chantry in honour of God and the Blessed Virgin Mary and to have masses said for the benefit of the founders and all the departed. It was established in St. Nicholas Within in the chapel of St. Mary and was under the authority of the Provincial of the Augustinian Friars of England.

After the dissolution of the monasteries, chantries in parish churches in England were abolished, but no act was passed to abolish them in Ireland; some continued to function according to the use of the Church of Ireland. In this way, the chantry of St. Mary continued to function, as a sinecure, until 1882.

Some years earlier the Parliament of Ireland had given Edward Somerton — justice of the Court of King's Bench (Ireland) — permission to found another chantry in St. Nicholas.

== Notable parishioners ==
During the Interregnum (1650s), Daniel Hutchinson, Thomas Hooke, John Preston and Richard Tighe, all served as alderman, were all Mayors of Dublin, and all worshipped at Dr Samuel Winter's independent congregation meeting at the Church of St. Nicholas Within. (Hooke like Hutchinson was an elder of the church.)

Jonathan Edwards (1615–1681), from Denbighshire, Wales became curate at this church in 1661. He went on to become Archdeacon of Derry.

== See also ==
- The Tholsel, Dublin
