= All Alive and Merry =

Play by Samuel Johnson

- Original language: English
- Written by: Samuel Johnson
- Genre: Comedy

Premiere
- Date: 10 January 1737
- Place: Lincoln's Inn Fields Theatre

All Alive and Merry is a 1737 comedy play by the British writer Samuel Johnson. The original Lincoln's Inn Fields cast included William Giffard, Charlotte Charke and Anna Marcella Giffard. It was staged by Henry Giffard's company which had recently moved from the Goodman's Fields Theatre in Whitechapel.

== Bibliography ==
- Burling, William J. A Checklist of New Plays and Entertainments on the London Stage, 1700-1737. Fairleigh Dickinson Univ Press, 1992.
- Nicoll, Allardyce. A History of Early Eighteenth Century Drama: 1700-1750. CUP Archive, 1927.
