= Bewley's =

Irish hot beverage company

Bewley's Limited
- Type: Limited
- Industry: Beverages
- Founded: 1840; 186 years ago in Dublin, Ireland
- Founders: Samuel Bewley; Charles Bewley
- Headquarters: Northern Cross, Malahide Road, Dublin, Ireland
- Products: Coffee, tea
- Revenue: €170 Million (2019)
- Parent: Bewley's Ltd
- Website: www.bewleys.com/ie/

Bewley's is an Irish hot beverage company, located in Dublin and founded in 1840, which operates internationally. Its primary business operations are the production of tea and coffee, and the operations of cafés. Bewley's has operations in Ireland, the UK and the United States; in California as Java City and formerly in the Boston area under the Rebecca's Cafe name.

== History ==
The Bewley family were Quakers who originated in Cumberland and moved to Ireland in the 17th century. They entered the tea trade, and in 1835, Samuel Bewley and his son Charles landed 2,099 chests of tea shipped from Canton in China. The Bewley family subsequently expanded into the coffee trade and in the late 19th century, they opened cafes in South Great George's Street in 1894, and Westmoreland Street in 1896. The flagship Grafton Street café was opened by Ernest Bewley in 1927. The Grafton Street building had once housed Whyte's Academy, a school whose pupils included the Duke of Wellington and Robert Emmet.

In 1986 the company was taken over by Campbell Catering forming the Campbell Bewley Group. By 1999, the company operated more than twenty cafes in Ireland and six overseas. In 2010 they employed around 800 people worldwide, although 140 jobs were lost in early 2015 with the temporary closure of the Bewley's Oriental Café on Grafton Street in Dublin. In May 2018, Bewley's launched 100% recyclable cups.

== Branches ==
=== Bewley's Grafton Street ===
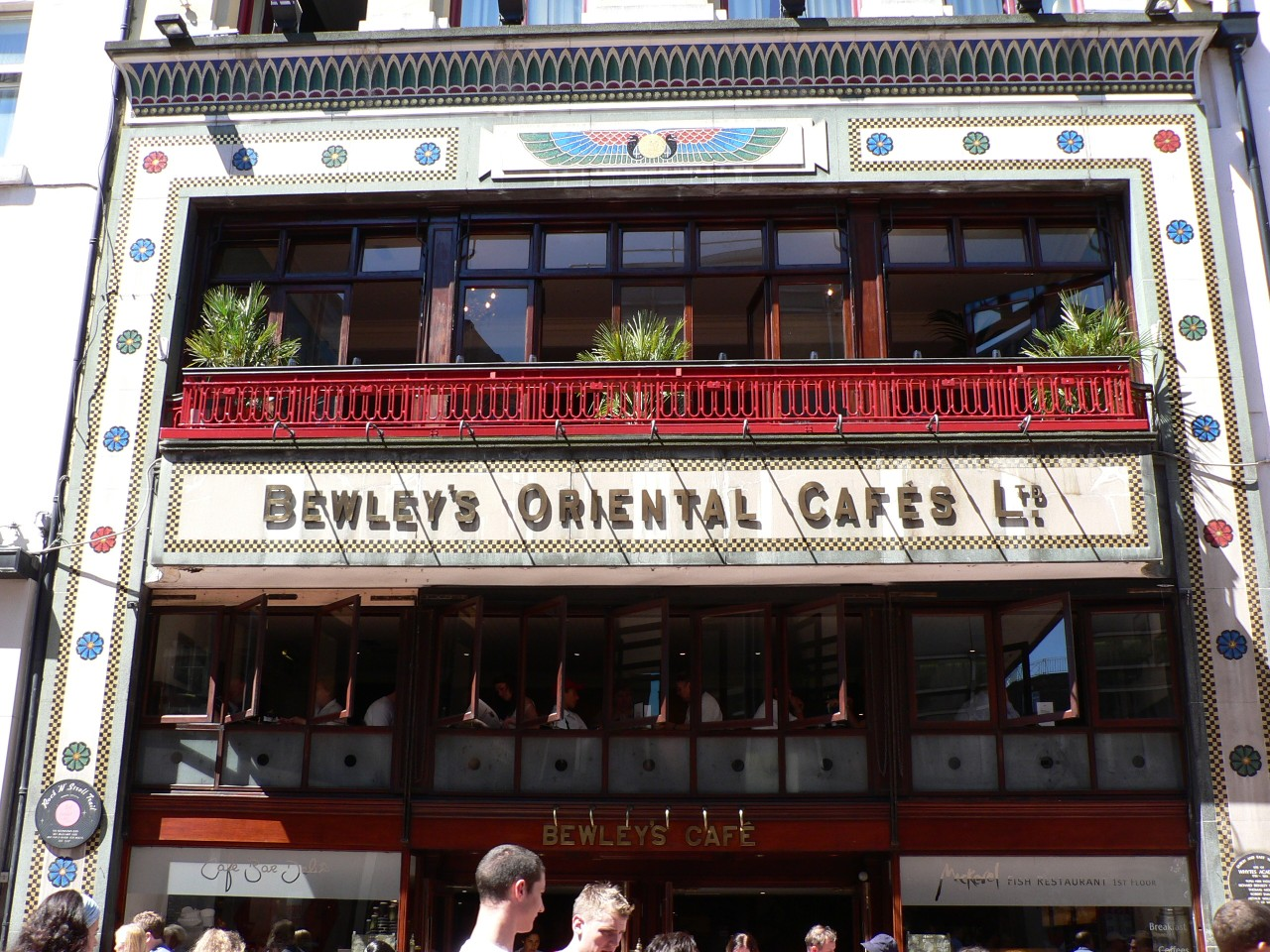
Bewley's Oriental Café on Grafton Street

The company has operated a café on Dublin's Grafton Street since 1927. Sometimes described as a "Dublin landmark" the building shows influence from the Art Deco movement, with its façade decorated with an Egyptian Revival mosaic, a style rare in Dublin. It was designed by the Dublin architectural firm, Millar & Symes. In the interior, there are stained glass windows by Harry Clarke showing orders of architecture. The windows are on the ground floor towards the back of the building. A stained glass window by artist Jim Fitzpatrick from the Mary Street branch was stored after its closure and then transferred to the remaining Grafton Street branch. A third stained glass artist's work is included in the Grafton Street store, a window by Pauline Bewick entitled Cafe Society. The building was modified extensively in 1995.

This outlet was closed between November 2004 and May 2005 for refurbishment and restoration. In 2007, its lease was challenged by the landlord, Ickendel Limited, after extensive works were carried out without landlord consent. The Grafton Street premises closed again for more extensive refurbishment works from February 2015. By October 2015, Bewley's announced that the length of the closure would extend, and by mid-2016, the date of reopening had been pushed back to the end of 2016. Ultimately, in November 2017, Bewley's Grafton Street was reopened after the "1000 day" multimillion-euro refurbishment.

In May 2020, during the COVID-19 pandemic, management informed staff that the Grafton Street café would close permanently "in the coming weeks", leading to the loss of 110 jobs. However, in late July 2020, it was announced that it would re-open on a phased basis.

==== Ownership of Harry Clarke stained glass ====
The lease was subject to court proceedings from the landlord, as RGRE v Bewley's, related to the Harry Clarke stained glass in the building.

The tenants maintained that the Clarke windows were artworks and not part of the building's fabric, whereas the landlord maintained that they were. The Court of Appeal ruled in July 2024 that all of the six works were indeed part of the building so they could not be sold by the tenant. The Supreme Court upheld this ruling in February 2026.

=== US and UK ===
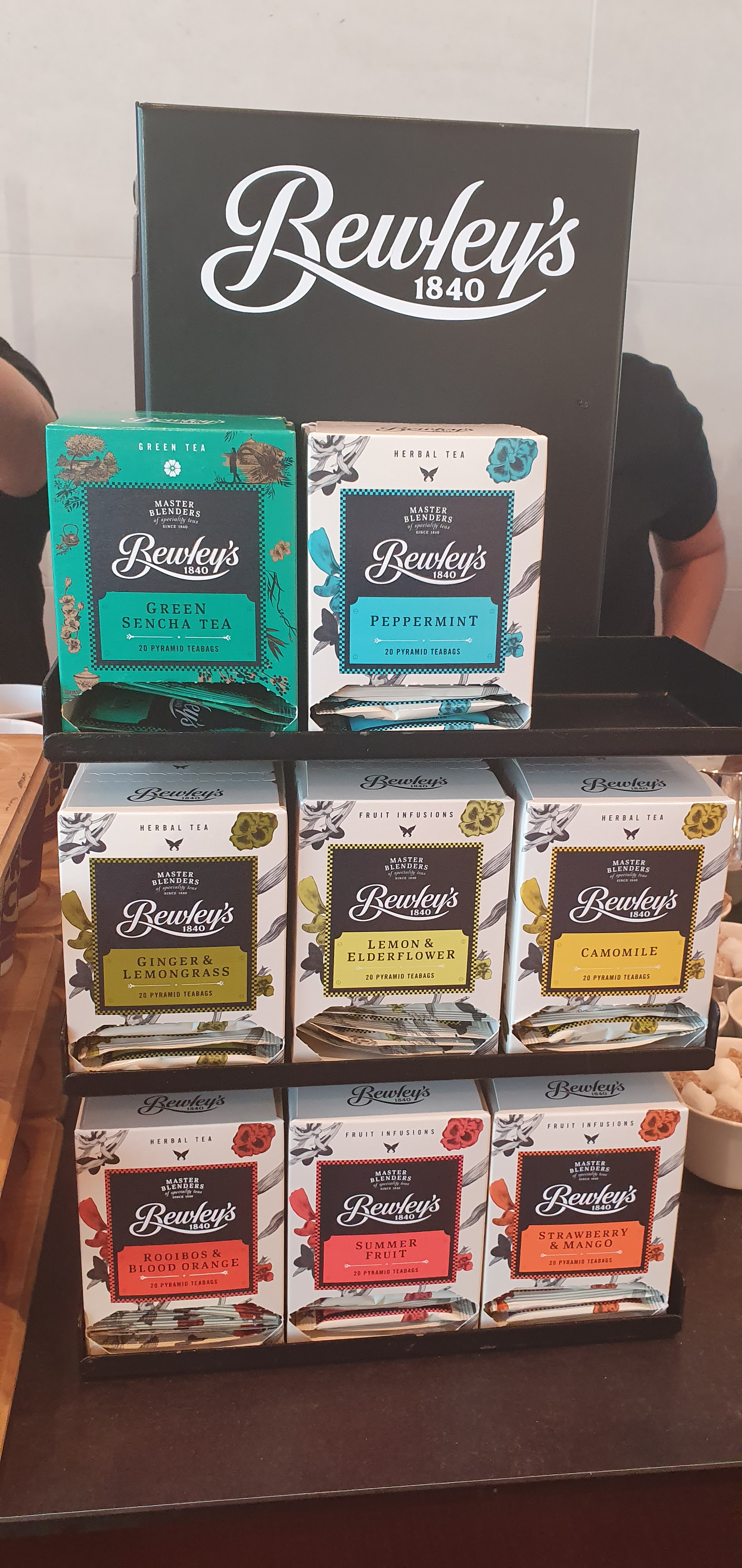
Selection of herbal teas packaged for retail sale

The company acquired the Rebecca's Cafe chain in the Boston, Massachusetts area in 1997, and expanded to the west coast in 2000 with the purchase of the Java City brand.

Bewley's entered the UK market in 2011 following the acquisition of speciality coffee supplier, Darlington's before acquiring Bolling Coffee in 2013 and UK foodservice distributor, Peros in 2015.

=== Former ===
Bewley's themselves operated a number of other branches in Dublin City Centre, including Fleet Street/Westmoreland Street (now a TGI Fridays); Mary Street and a short-term branch on South Great Georges Street during the refurbishment of the Grafton Street location. Branches also existed in Terminal 1 at Dublin Airport in some Waterstones stores, and in Arnotts department store as well as Belfast and Bangor.

A franchise operator ran multiple locations in suburban shopping centres including Nutgrove, The Square, Tallaght, Omni Park, Stillorgan Shopping Centre, the old Dundrum Shopping Centre as well as the chains first location on South Great Georges Street. Some of these locations had previous been run by the company directly. Franchised locations previously existed in Belfast and Portadown, closing in 1996.

== Bewley's Hotels ==
Bewley's Hotels were a chain of hotels using the Bewley's trademark both in Ireland and in the United Kingdom, owned by Slaney Foods and the Moran Hotel Group.

This brand licensing agreement ended by mid-2015, following the sale of Moran Bewleys Hotels to Dalata Hotel Group.

The flagship hotel in the chain was in a restored 19th century Masonic school in Ballsbridge. Now known as the Clayton Hotel, Ballsbridge, some Masonic symbolism remains visible in the building's ornamentation.

== See also ==
- List of coffeehouse chains
- Dick's Coffee House
