= Hurlothrumbo =

Play by Samuel Johnson

Hurlothrumbo; or, The super-natural is an 18th-century English nonsense play written by the dancing-master Samuel Johnson of Cheshire, and published in 1729. The spectacle incorporates both musical and spoken elements. The play opened on March 29, 1729, at the Theatre Royal Haymarket.

Writing in 1855, Frederick Lawrence says of the play:

The extraordinary drama of Hurlothrumbo, above alluded to, was then (mirabiledictu!) the talk and admiration of the town. A more curious or a more insane production has seldom issued from human pen.

— The Life of Henry Fielding, p. 21.

The author himself performed as a principal in the play, with singing, dancing, playing fiddle, and walking on stilts. The novelist and playwright Henry Fielding mentions the play in his novel Tom Jones:

Thus the famous author of Hurlothrumbo told a learned bishop, that the reason his lordship could not taste the excellence of his piece was, that he did not read it with a fiddle in his hand; which instrument he himself had always had in his own, when he composed it.

== Namesakes ==
A significant early collection of graffiti was published under the pseudonym Hurlothrumbo in 1731. The book, titled The Merry-Thought: or, the Glass-Window and Bog-House Miscellany, transcribes graffiti found in public latrines in England, much of it humorous or sexual. The volume may have been attributed to Hurlothrumbo by the publisher or editor to benefit from the popularity of Johnson's play.

Hurlothrumbo is said to have been the name of the steamship on which Emperor Norton came to San Francisco. Norton then went into partnership with the ship's engineer to use the engine from the scrapped ship to power equipment for gold mining camps, an apparatus also called Hurlothrumbo.
