= John Sherlock (politician) =

Irish politician (1603–1652)

Sir John Sherlock (1603-1652) was an Irish landowner, politician and courtier of the seventeenth century.

He was probably born at Littlerath, near Sallins, County Kildare, eldest son of the wealthy merchant Christopher Sherlock and his first wife Eleanor. The Sherlock family had settled in County Kildare early in the previous century.

He appears to have enjoyed the favour of King Charles I of England: he was knighted in 1635 and became a gentleman of the Privy Chamber. The family was traditionally Roman Catholic, but John conformed to the Church of Ireland. His father sat in three Irish Parliaments between 1613 and 1642, and John himself entered the Irish House of Commons in 1642 as member for County Dublin, following the expulsion of Patrick Barnwall for non-attendance. As Roman Catholics were now in effect excluded from Parliament, he was required to take the Oath of Supremacy and apparently did so without any pressure, despite his Catholic background.

He died in March 1652 and was buried in St. Michan's Church, Dublin. He married twice: nothing is known of his first wife. His second wife, whom he married in 1634, was Katherine Ashburnham, who outlived him and remarried John Preston, who had been Mayor of Dublin 1653–4, and later sat in the Commons for Navan in 1660. Sir John had no children, and his estates passed to his half-brother Phillip.

== Sources ==
- Burke, Bernard Landed Gentry of Ireland London Harrison and Sons 1912
- D'Alton, John King James's Irish Army List Dublin 1860
- Little, Patrick, ed. Ireland in crisis: war, politics and religion 1641-50 Manchester University Press 2020
