= Samuel Johnson (dramatist) =

English comic playwright (1691–1773)

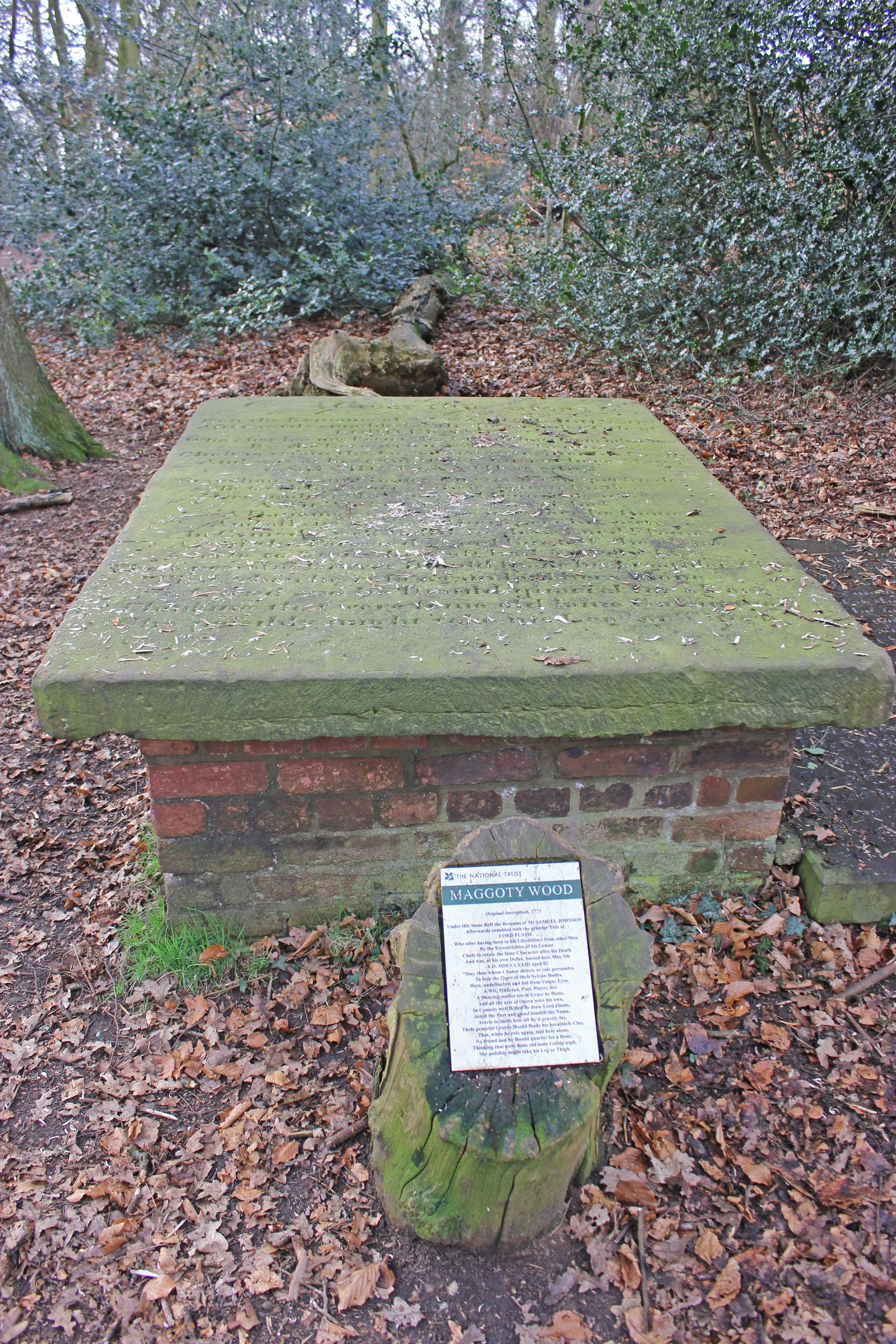
Johnson's grave at Gawsworth, Cheshire

Samuel Johnson (1691 – 5 May 1773) was an English dancing-master, dramatist and violinist, known especially for his 1729 stage work Hurlothrumbo, which was satirised by Henry Fielding. He was the last professional jester in England. His grave is in woodland known as Maggoty Wood, close to Gawsworth Hall.

== Life, stage and music ==
Johnson was a native of Cheshire. In 1722 he gave a ball at Manchester, noted by John Byrom, and in 1724 he was in London with his fiddle. He worked to have staged his Hurlothrumbo, which he had shown to Byrom and other friends in Manchester in the previous year.

Hurlothrumbo was produced at the "little theatre in the Haymarket" early in April 1729, an epilogue by Byrom being added on the second night, while a prologue was contributed by Amos Meredith, another of the north-country wits in town. The whole circle attended and pledged themselves to applaud it from beginning to end. The piece ran for more than 30 nights, attracting crowded and fashionable audiences. They included the Duke of Montagu, who was credited with "the idea" of the piece. The most striking figure in the performance was the author himself, who played the part of Lord Flame, fiddling, dancing, and sometimes walking on stilts. The piece was satirised in Henry Fielding's Author's Farce (1729). "Hurlothrumbo, or the Supernatural", was published with a dedication to Lady Delves, signed Lord Flame. A second edition, with a dedication to Lord Walpole (who had subscribed for thirty copies) and signed with the author's name, followed in the same year (1729).

In 1730 Johnson, who had declined to produce Hurlothrumbo at Manchester, brought out, at Sir John Vanbrugh's opera-house in the Haymarket, The Chester Comics, with alterations by Colley Cibber. There followed a production called The Mad Lovers, or the Beauties of the Poets, acted at the Haymarket, and printed in 1732 with a frontispiece representing the author in the part of Lord Wildfire. The name of a play by him performed – not to his satisfaction – in April 1735 is unknown. In 1737 his comedy All Alive and Merry was played. It was received with applause on the second night and ran for five or six more. Also attributed to him are a comic opera, A Fool made Wise, and a farce, Sir John Falstaff in Masquerade, both acted in 1741, and a tragedy, Pompey the Great. (All are unprinted.) Besides these plays Johnson composed A Vision of Heaven, published in 1738. In the preface the author professes to have acted part of it before the Duke of Wharton and Bishop Francis Gastrell. He is also said to have written Harmony in Uproar, and a published dialogue entitled Court and Country.

For some years after the production of Hurlothrumbo Johnson remained active in London, but also carried on his profession as dancing-master at Manchester.

== Retirement ==
During the last 30 years of his life, Johnson retired to the village of Gawsworth, near Macclesfield, where he was known under the nicknames Maggoty or Fiddler Johnson.

Johnson died at Gawsworth New Hall on 5 May 1773, aged 82, and was buried in a wood nearby. The wood is still known as Maggoty Wood and reputed to be haunted by his ghost. The grave is a Grade II listed building.
