= Thomas Hooke (mayor) =

Irish politician and merchant (died 1670)

Thomas 1st Hooke (15??–1670) was an Irish merchant and significant figure in Dublin politics from the 1640s until his death.

He appeared in Dublin's civic records first in 1637. Hooke made his fortune selling herrings and cheese to the English Parliamentary army in Ireland. He was elected Mayor of Dublin in 1654. His close connections with the Cromwellian administration in the city brought him a succession of positions of power and influence - justice of the peace, revenue commissioner, commissioner for probate of wills and farmer of the petty customs of Dublin, as well as commissioner of the Civil Survey for the county of Dublin.

Religiously he was Independent and an elder of the congregation of St Nicholas-within-the-walls, close to his house on Castle Street.

Corballis House and Kilsallaghan Estate in north County Dublin was granted to him as part of the Cromwellian land settlement. Following the restoration of Charles II in 1660, Hooke's ownership of the house, along with much of the rest of the land he had acquired, was contested. In 1666 he was eventually forced to relinquish Corballis House, but not before receiving permission from Lord Deputy Ormond to remove ‘certain fittings put up by the petitioner.’

He was accused of disloyalty in 1663 but escaped censure.

Hooke died in 1670 and his will was proven in 1672.

Civic offices
Preceded by John Preston	Mayor of Dublin; 1654–1655	Succeeded by Richard Tighe
