= Interregnum (Ireland) =

Ireland during the Interregnum (1649–1660) covers the period from the execution of Charles I until the restoration of the monarchy under Charles II in 1660.

== History ==
Life for both Irish and English Catholics in Ireland became increasingly difficult under Cromwell's rule, and Cromwell remains a despised figure in Ireland to this day.

Oliver Cromwell's sweeping campaign in Ireland began in August 1649. He left in May 1650, but the campaign continued until 1653. Its effects devastated Ireland's Catholic population, roughly one-third of whom were killed or exiled by the war. Famine and plague were the biggest killers, resulting in large part from the scorched earth tactics used by Parliamentary forces. Some Irish prisoners of war were sold as indentured labourers in the West Indies. The Catholic landowning class was dispossessed en masse. Thousands of New Model Army soldiers and the Parliament's creditors were settled on confiscated Irish lands. Those Catholic landowners deemed innocent of rebellion against the Parliament but who had not shown "constant good affection" still had their land confiscated and were forced to relocate to Connacht, where the soil was poorer.

The practice of Catholicism was banned and many of the soldier/settlers set up dissenting religious communities, such as Quakers or Baptists, under the protection of the Parliamentary forces. The Scottish Presbyterian community was also disadvantaged by the Interregnum regime, as most of them had taken the Solemn League and Covenant and had fought with the Scots against the Parliament in the Third English Civil War (1649–50). Charles Fleetwood, the parliamentary commander in Ireland from 1652 to 1655, was viewed as being hostile to Catholics, Presbyterians, and the pre-war English Protestant settlers at the expense of the radical new settlers. Henry Cromwell, who replaced Fleetwood in 1655, was seen as a more conservative influence, conciliating the "Old Protestant" landed class and allowing the harshest legislation against Catholics (such as a ban on their living in towns) to lapse. Towards the end of the Interregnum, Parliamentarian generals Charles Coote and Richard Boyle (who were also pre-war English settlers) seized the strongholds in Ireland in preparation for the restoration of the monarchy.

== Citations and sources ==
=== Sources ===
- Barnard, Toby Christopher (1975). Cromwellian Ireland: English Government and Reform in Ireland 1649–1660. Oxford University Press. ISBN 0-19-821858-3.
- Duffy, Seán (2002). The Illustrated History of Ireland. New York: Contemporary Books. ISBN 0-8092-2437-2.
- McCourt, Malachy (2004). Malachy McCourt's History of Ireland. New York: MJF Books. ISBN 978-1-6067-1037-1.
