= Christchurch Place =

Street in Dublin, Ireland

- Interactive map of Christchurch Place
- Former names: Skinners Row, Skinner's Row
- Location: Dublin, Ireland
- Postal code: D02
- Coordinates: 53.34307°N 6.27075°W

Christchurch Place (Irish: Plás Theampall Chríost) is a street in central Dublin, Ireland, formerly known as Skinners Row or Skinner's Row, it formed one of the main thoroughfares in medieval Dublin.

== History ==
The street runs along the southern edge of Christ Church Cathedral. It was previously known as Skinners or Skinner's Row, named for the traders working on leather and hides that once occupied the street. It was lined by a number of historically important but now demolished buildings. Before the Wide Streets Commission, the street was apparently as narrow as 17 feet and was described by Sir John Gilbert as "a narrow and sombre alley". Where it met Castle Street, there was a pillory, and at the junction with High Street, there was the now-lost High Market Cross. It also met Fishamble Street at a short stretch which was known as Booth Street.

One of the key buildings of Skinner's Row was the Tholsel, which stood on the junction of Skinner's Row, Nicholas Street and High Street. This building dated from 1680s, but a structure with a similar function had stood on this site from the early 1300s. It was demolished in 1809, with nothing of the structure remaining. Some of the statues from the Tholsel are now on display in Christ Church Cathedral. A small park named the Peace Garden (now Peace Park) was opened on the site in 1988.

The Market Cross also stood near the western end of the junction with High Street. One of its earliest confirmed mentions is from a public punishment in 1571 however it was likely erected much earlier. The last remaining drawing of the cross is by John Simmons in 1776. It was then taken down sometime in the late 18th or early 19th century and its whereabouts are now unknown.

Throughout the late 1700s and early 1800s, Skinner's Row was the street where many booksellers, printers, jewellers and goldsmiths worked. In 1768, the first iteration of the book store, Hodges Figgis, opened on the street. It was also the location of Dick's Coffee House in Carberry House, which was demolished in 1780 and Stationers' Hall which housed one of the Guilds of the City of Dublin until it was demolished for road widening in June 1762.

Skinner's Row was the narrowest point in the streets of Dublin at the time, and in the 1820s the street was widened and renamed Christchurch Place.

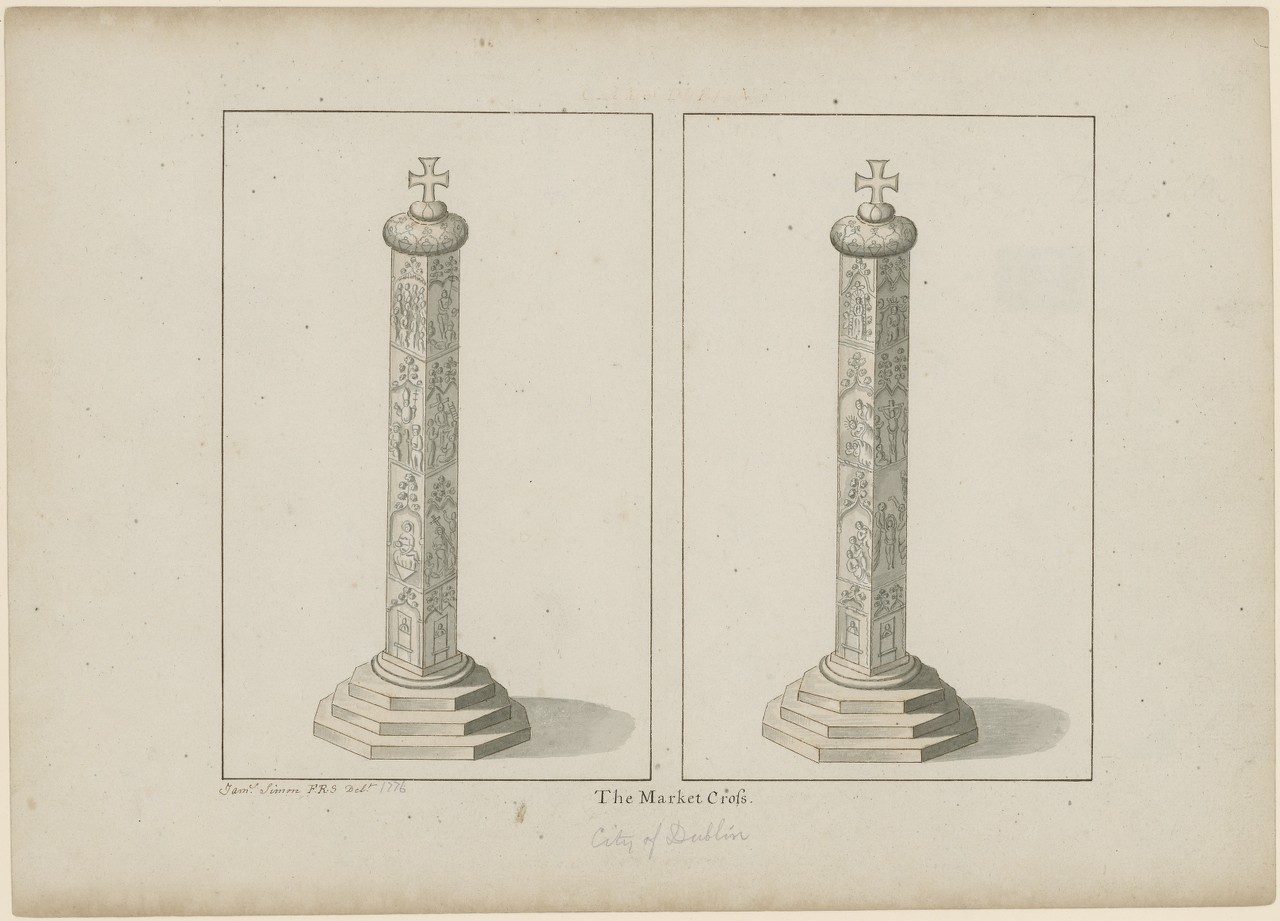
The Market Cross, Dublin

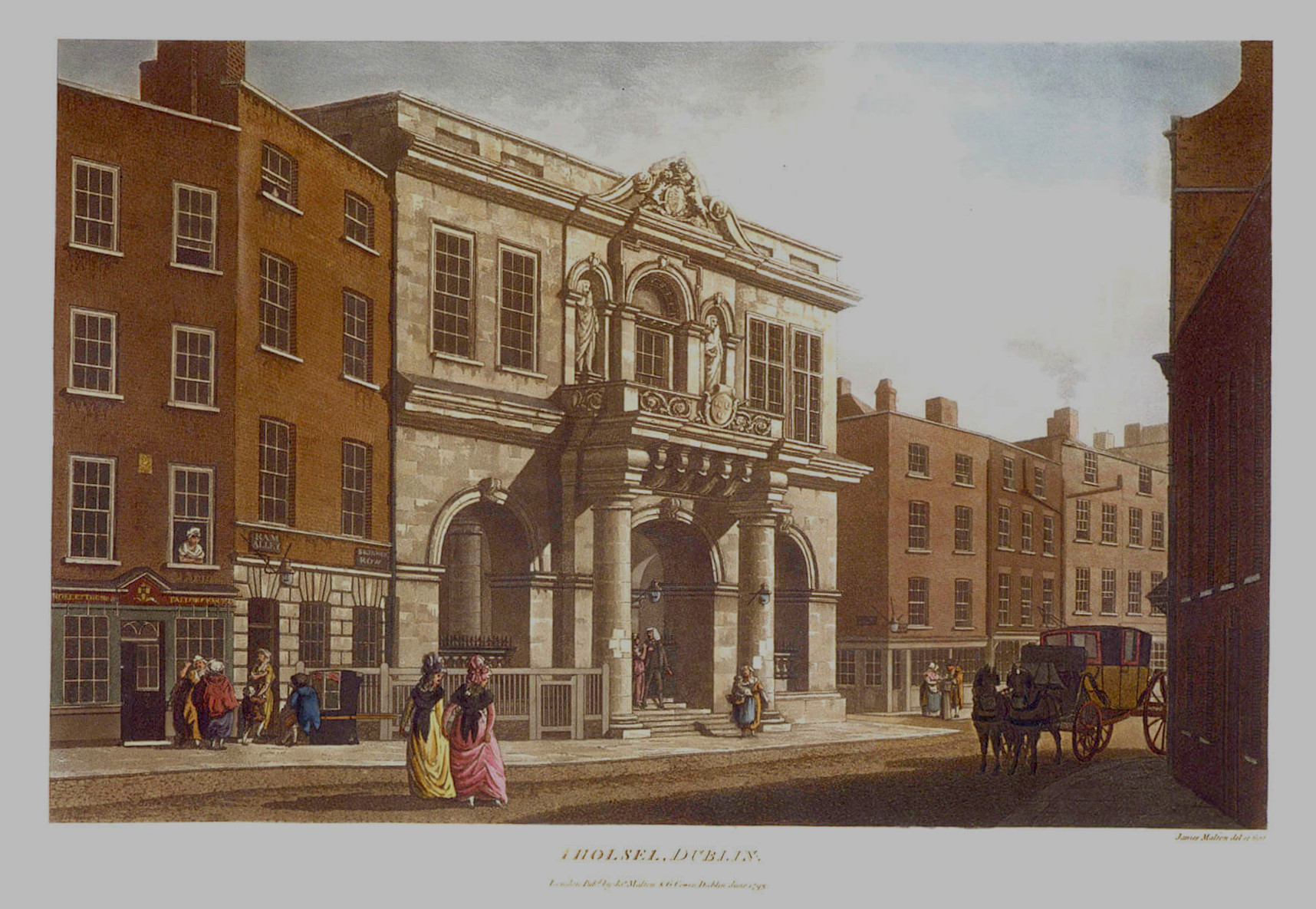
The Tholsel, Dublin

== See also ==
- List of streets and squares in Dublin
- Church of St. Nicholas Within, Dublin
- The Tholsel, Dublin
- Dick's Coffee House
