= School of Engineering (Trinity College Dublin) =

School of Engineering, Trinity College Dublin
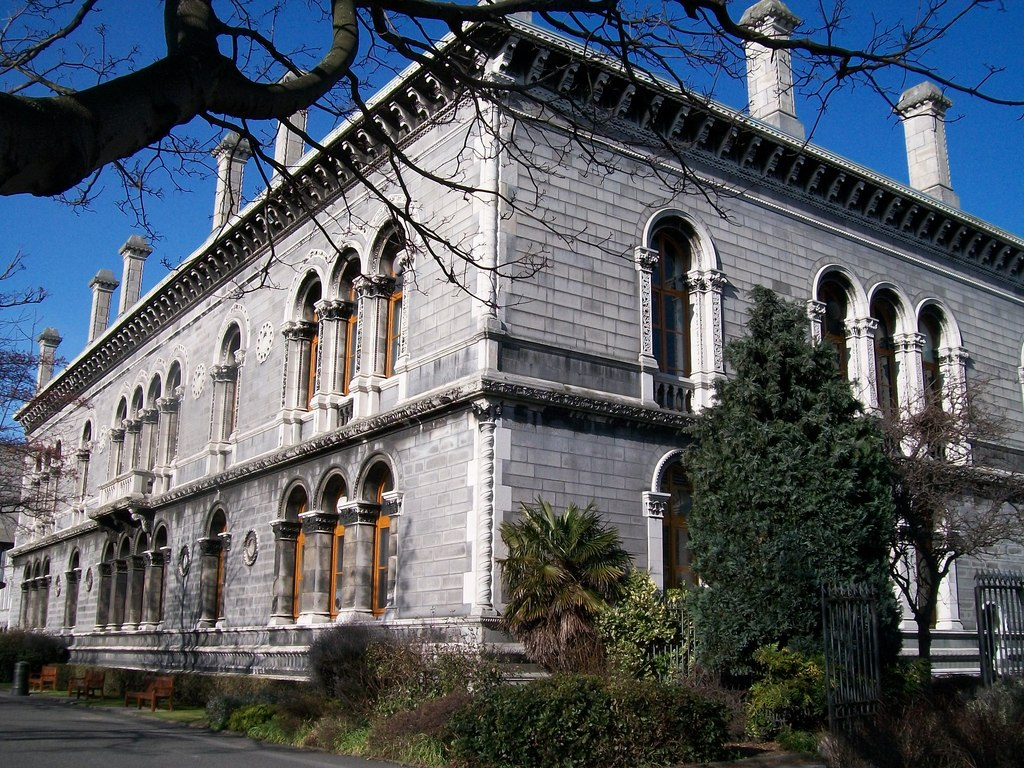
- The Engineering School (Museum Building).
- Type: Engineering School
- Established: 1841
- Affiliations: Trinity College Dublin; Institution of Engineers of Ireland
- Head of School: Henry Rice
- Location: Dublin City, Ireland; 53.343836°N 6.255255°W
- Faculty: Science, Technology, Engineering and Maths
- Website: www.tcd.ie/engineering/

The School of Engineering, Trinity College Dublin is the oldest engineering school in Ireland and one of the oldest in the world. It provides undergraduate, taught postgraduate and research degrees in engineering. It is the highest-ranked engineering school in Ireland by QS Rankings and by Times World University Rankings.

== History ==
The School of Engineering was established in 1841 by Humphrey Lloyd. At that time, teaching was oriented towards civil engineering, geology, chemistry and mathematics. The original two-year course led to the award of a Diploma in Civil Engineering. The BAI (Baccalaureus in Arte Ingeniaria) degree was introduced in 1872. A long-standing stipulation of the college was that graduates in professional subjects including engineering must first be Bachelors of Arts. As such, the BA degree was bestowed before the BAI degree at commencement ceremonies. That practice continues to this day, although students now take subjects in engineering science in place of arts subjects.

Electrical Engineering was introduced in the 1890s, focusing on electromagnetism and applied physics and was taught by the Department of Experimental Philosophy (Physics). About a decade later, it became a part of the School of Engineering in its own right and had laboratories located in the Red Brick Building.

The engineering course was extended to four years in 1956. From the late Fifties, teaching in solid state electronics, control engineering and computing were introduced under Professor Bill Wright. Research in these areas continued through the Sixties, including Professor Brendan Scaife's research into dielectrics. Student numbers increased rapidly in these years.

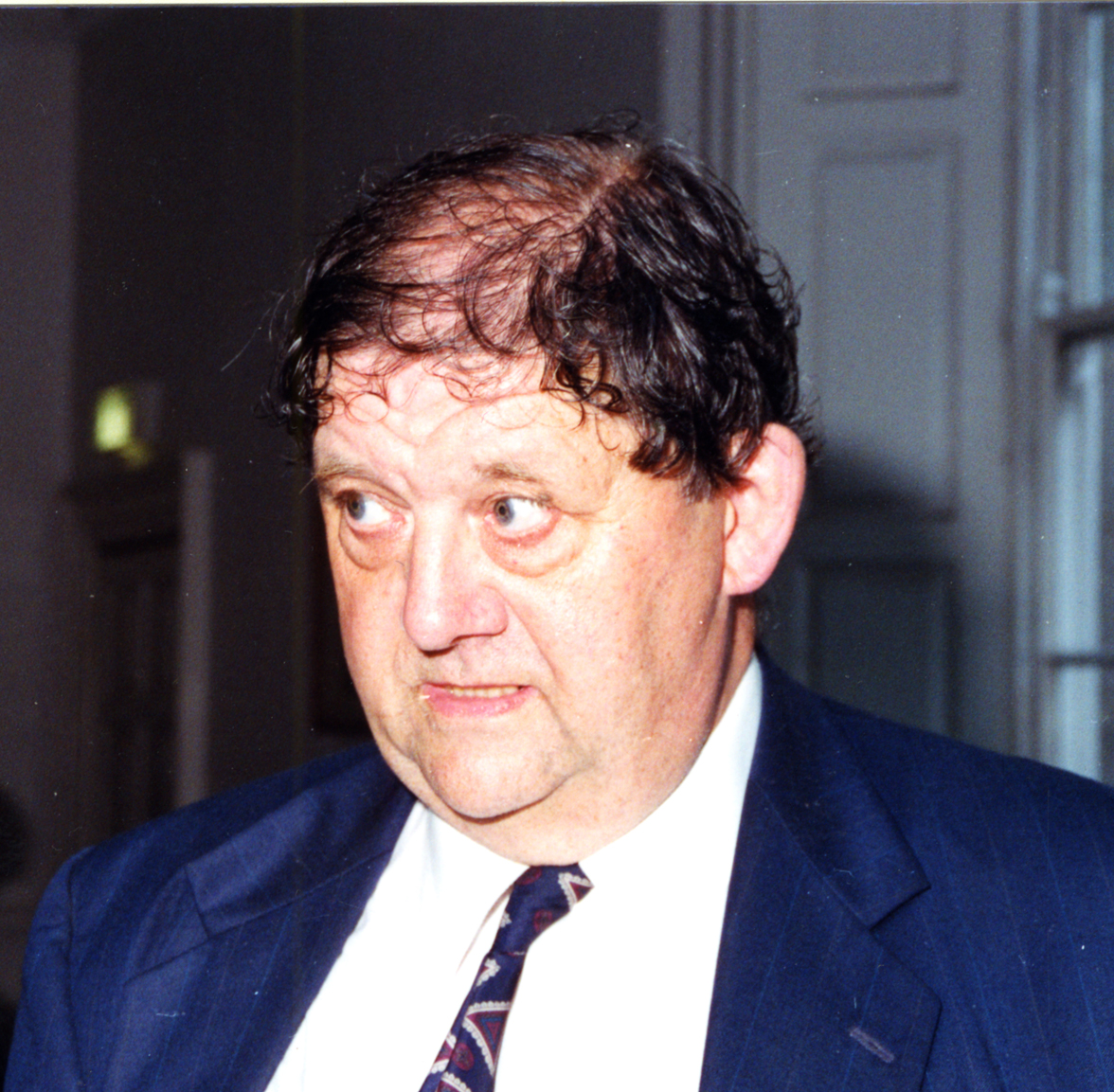
Professor John Byrne

Computer Science was first taught in 1963 under the Graduate School of Engineering Studies. Professor John Byrne later founded the Department of Computer Science in 1969. In 2005, rapid growth led to it breaking from Engineering to form the School of Computer Science and Statistics. The two schools continue to jointly offer the Computer Engineering course.

The National Manpower Programme was established in 1979 to increase the amount of graduates trained in engineering and technology. As a result, the School was restructured into three disciplines of mechanical, civil and electronic engineering in 1980. The BAI course was also amended so that, for the first two years, all engineers studied a common curriculum focusing on engineering science followed by specialisation in one of the disciplines for the sophister years.

In 2000, the Engineering with Management course ran for the first time. The Biomedical Engineering specialisation followed in 2012. The Faculty of Engineering, Mathematics and Science was formed from the Schools of Science and Engineering in 2007 following the dissolution of the Faculty of Engineering and System Sciences and a major restructuring of all the Faculties, Schools and Departments in the college.

In 2013, the MAI (Magister Arte Ingeniaria) degree was introduced an optional fifth year of the engineering programme. This was a consequence of the Bologna Process, which requires that those who wish to apply for chartered status hold a master's degree BAI students are required to obtain a Second Class Honours, First Division or higher in their combined sophister year annual examinations to be eligible to proceed to the MAI year. Students in the MAI year take advanced modules in the chosen specialty and also complete a project that runs over two semesters. An earlier variation of the MAI degree had been in existence since 1860.

The school celebrated its 175th anniversary in November 2016. Celebratory events were organised, including unveiling a plaque honouring Humphrey Lloyd, a public lecture delivered by John Parker and a Gala dinner.

== Courses ==
The School offers undergraduate, taught postgraduate and research postgraduate courses.

Undergraduate Courses

- BA, BAI in Engineering
  - Civil Engineering (A Stream)
  - Mechanical Engineering (B Stream)
  - Electronic Engineering (C Stream)
  - Electronic and Computer Engineering (CD Stream)
  - Computer Engineering (D Stream)
  - Biomedical Engineering (BIO Stream)
- BSc (Ing.) in Engineering with Management
- BSc in Environmental Science and Engineering (jointly offered with School of Natural Sciences)

Postgraduate Taught Courses

- MAI (Studia) in Engineering (Fifth Year of the BAI Course)
- MSc in Engineering (Environmental / Structural and Geotechnical / Transport / Sustainable Energy)
- MSc in Bioengineering
- MSc in Electronic Information Engineering
- MSc in Mechanical Engineering
- MPhil in Music and Media Technologies
- Postgraduate Diplomas in the Graduate School of Professional Engineering Studies
  - Applied Building Repair and Conservation
  - Construction Law and Contract Administration
  - Engineering for Climate Action
  - Fire Safety Practice
  - Health & Safety in Construction
  - Project Management
  - Sustainable Energy & the Environment

Postgraduate Research Courses

- MAI (Indagatio) in Engineering
- MSc in Engineering
- PhD in Engineering

== Research ==
The School has an international reputation for its research, which includes varying areas such as: concrete technology, hydrogeology, wind energy, transport modelling, media signal processing, neural engineering, future networks and communications engineering, instrumentation and control, fluid and heat transfer, material fatigue and bioengineering. As of 2021, the School reportedly had an annual research income of over €10m.

== Buildings and facilities ==
- The Printing House (1734), houses the Department of Electrical and Electronic Engineering.
- Museum Building (1857), houses the Department of Civil, Structural and Environmental Engineering and the School Office.
- Parsons Building (1895), houses the Department of Mechanical and Manufacturing Engineering.
- Red Brick Building (1903), houses the Civil Engineering Laboratories.
- Áras an Phiarsaigh (1971), houses the Department of Electrical and Electronic Engineering.
- Simon Perry Building (1993), houses the Department of Civil, Structural and Environmental Engineering.
- Trinity Biomedical Sciences Institute (2011), houses the Trinity Centre for Biomedical Engineering.

Engineering students also have lectures in other buildings in the Trinity campus, including the Hamilton Building, the Arts Building and Regent House.

== Prizes ==
The School of Engineering awards prizes every year to its students. Prizes are awarded after the BAI and MAI degree annual examinations to students with the highest aggregate of marks, provided First Class Honours are attained. Prizes in the Sophister and MAI years are awarded by discipline. A prize winners evening is held in the Museum Building.

== Student societies ==
The Engineering Society is one of the oldest societies in the university. The society room is located in Goldsmith Hall. Membership is open to all students and staff, regardless of their course of study. The society organises talks from academia and industry, engineering workshops, networking events, trips, quizzes and social events.

== Civil Engineering Heritage Archive ==
The Civil Engineering Heritage Archive is a collection of books, periodicals, photographs, engineering instruments and other archival material. Its purpose is to aid teaching and research into the historical background of civil engineering and related subjects. The Archive is located off the Drawing Office, on the top floor of the Museum Building. The Archive is one of the College Treasures.

== List of professorships ==
The following is a list of chairs according to the College Calendar.

- Professor of Civil Engineering (1842)
- Professor of Mechanical Engineering (1980)
- Professor of Electronic Engineering (1980)
- Michael McNamara Professor of Construction Innovation (2006)
- L.M. Thapar Professorship of Engineering (2017)

== Notable alumni ==
- John Byrne, Professor of Computer Science.
- Maurice Fitzmaurice, civil engineer.
- Percy French, songwriter.
- John Purser Griffith, Honorary Professor of Harbour Engineering.
- Jane Grimson, computer engineer and Pro-Chancellor of the University of Dublin.
- Ann-Marie Holmes, Vice President of Intel Ireland
- Nathaniel Hone the Younger, landscape painter.
- Chris Horn, electronic engineer.
- Edward Hull, professor of geology.
- John Joly, geologist.
- George Henry Kinahan, geologist.
- Richard Maunsell, mechanical engineer.
- Henry Benedict Medlicott, geologist.
- Paul Noonan, musician and frontman of Bell X1.
- Francis O'Reilly, 22nd Chancellor of the University of Dublin.
- Charles Algernon Parsons, mechanical engineer.
- Leah Paul, cricketer.
- James Ernest Richey, geologist.
- Francis Spring, Consulting Engineer to the Government of India.
- Bindon Blood Stoney, civil engineer.
- Anthony Traill, 33rd Provost of Trinity College.
- William Atcheson Traill, civil engineer.
- Charles Dickinson West, mechanical engineer.

== Notable staff ==
- Ann Cleare, composer.
- Linda Doyle, 45th Provost of Trinity College and electronic engineer (also an alumna).
- Karin Dubsky, ecologist and environmentalist.
- Anil Kokaram, Professor of Electronic Engineering.
- Humphrey Lloyd, 30th Provost of Trinity College.
- Caitríona Lally, bioengineer (also an alumna).
- Rocco Lupoi, mechanical engineer.
- John Macneill, civil engineer.
- Michael G. Monaghan, Professor in Biomedical Engineering.
- Margaret O'Mahony, Chair of Civil Engineering
- Patrick Prendergast, 44th Provost of Trinity College (also an alumnus).
- Brendan Scaife, academic electrical engineer and physicist.

== Sources ==
- Ron Cox, (Trinity College Dublin, 1993). Engineering at Trinity: Incorporating a Record of the School of Engineering.
