= Linda Hogan =

Linda Hogan may refer to:

- Linda Hogan (ethicist) (born 1964), Irish ethicist, theologian and academic
- Linda Hogan (TV personality) (born 1959), American television personality and ex-wife of wrestler Hulk Hogan
- Linda Hogan (writer) (born 1947), academic, storyteller and environmentalist
