= Linda Doyle =

Irish engineer, professor and academic leader

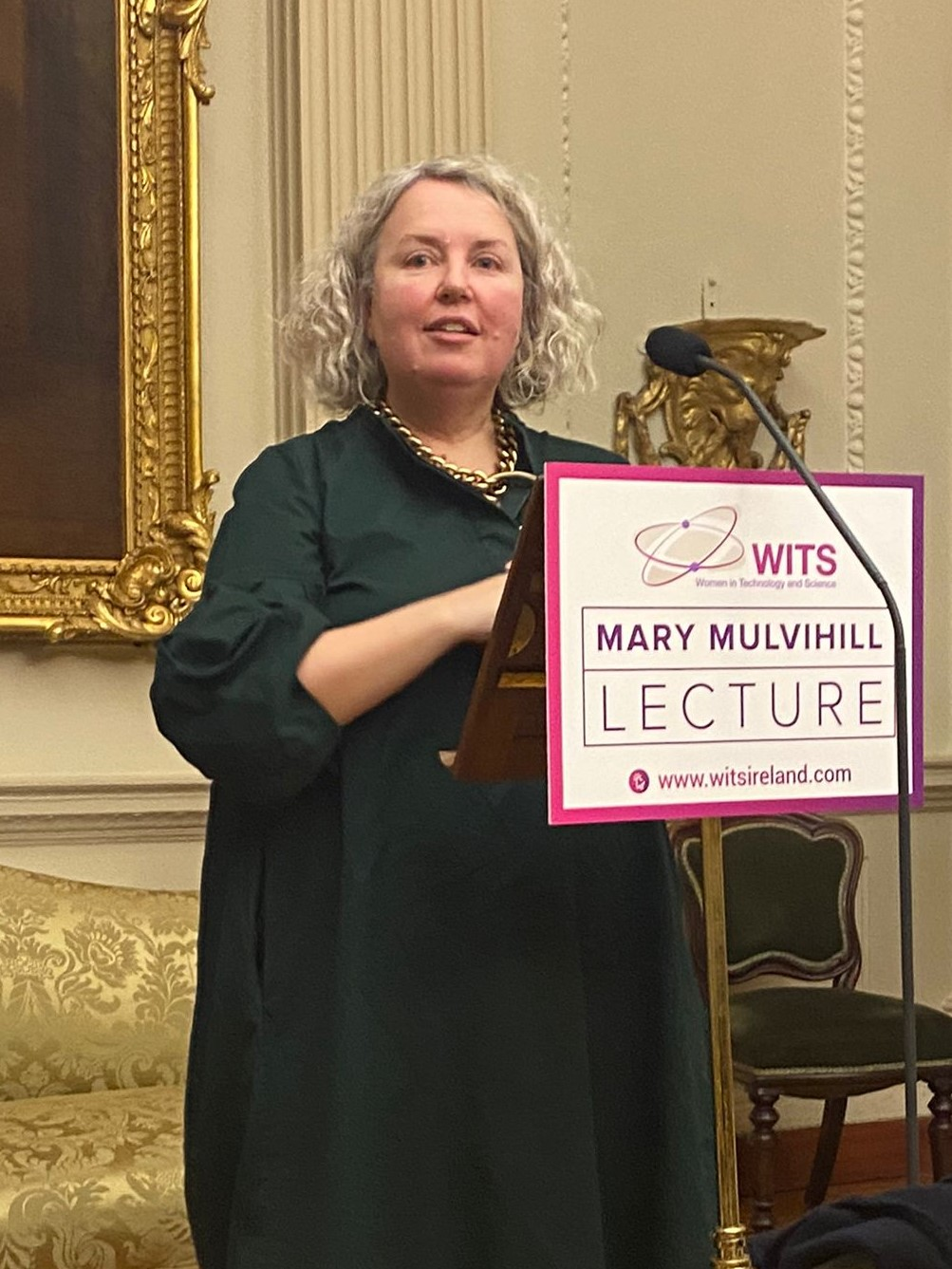
- Doyle delivering the WITS Mary Mulvihill Lecture 2021

45th Provost of Trinity College Dublin
- Incumbent
- Assumed office 1 August 2021
- Preceded by: Patrick Prendergast

Personal details
- Born: Cork, Ireland
- Domestic partner: Simon Tonge
- Education: University College Cork (BEng); Trinity College Dublin (MSc, PhD)
- Scientific career
- Fields: Electrical engineering
- Institutions: Trinity College Dublin
- Thesis: Radio-Wave Propagation in Dublin City at 2 GHz (1997)

Linda E. Doyle is an Irish academic and educator who is the 45th Provost of Trinity College Dublin, the university's chief officer, having assumed the office in August 2021. An electrical engineer, she has had a long academic career at Trinity, from the 1990s, most recently as Professor of Engineering and the Arts, in addition to holding other management roles such as Dean (and Vice-President) of Research. She has also led one telecommunications research centre at the university, and was the founding director of another, the multi-institution organisation known as CONNECT. Doyle has worked as a member of regulatory and advisory bodies in both Ireland, on broadband network strategy, and the UK, on mobile spectrum allocation. She is or has also been a director of public outreach projects such as Science Gallery Dublin and its international network, of two non-profit art galleries, and of two university spin-off companies.

== Early life and career ==
Doyle is a native of Togher, a southside suburb of Cork. She attended Togher Girls National School and then St Angela's College, on Patrick's Hill in northside Cork, before taking her undergraduate degree in electrical engineering in University College Cork, graduating with a B.E.E. in 1989. She moved to Trinity College Dublin (TCD) in 1989, and there completed a M.Sc. in 1993 and a Ph.D. in 1997 and later also a postgraduate diploma in Statistics. Doyle worked in industry for a year, including for Siemens in Germany for a period.

== Academic work ==
Doyle worked with flexible optical networks, and wireless communications, including spectrum management, reconfigurable mobile networks and cognitive radio. She later also pioneered some work on the crossover between engineering and the creative arts, founding an initiative and working group, the Orthogonal Methods Group (OMG).

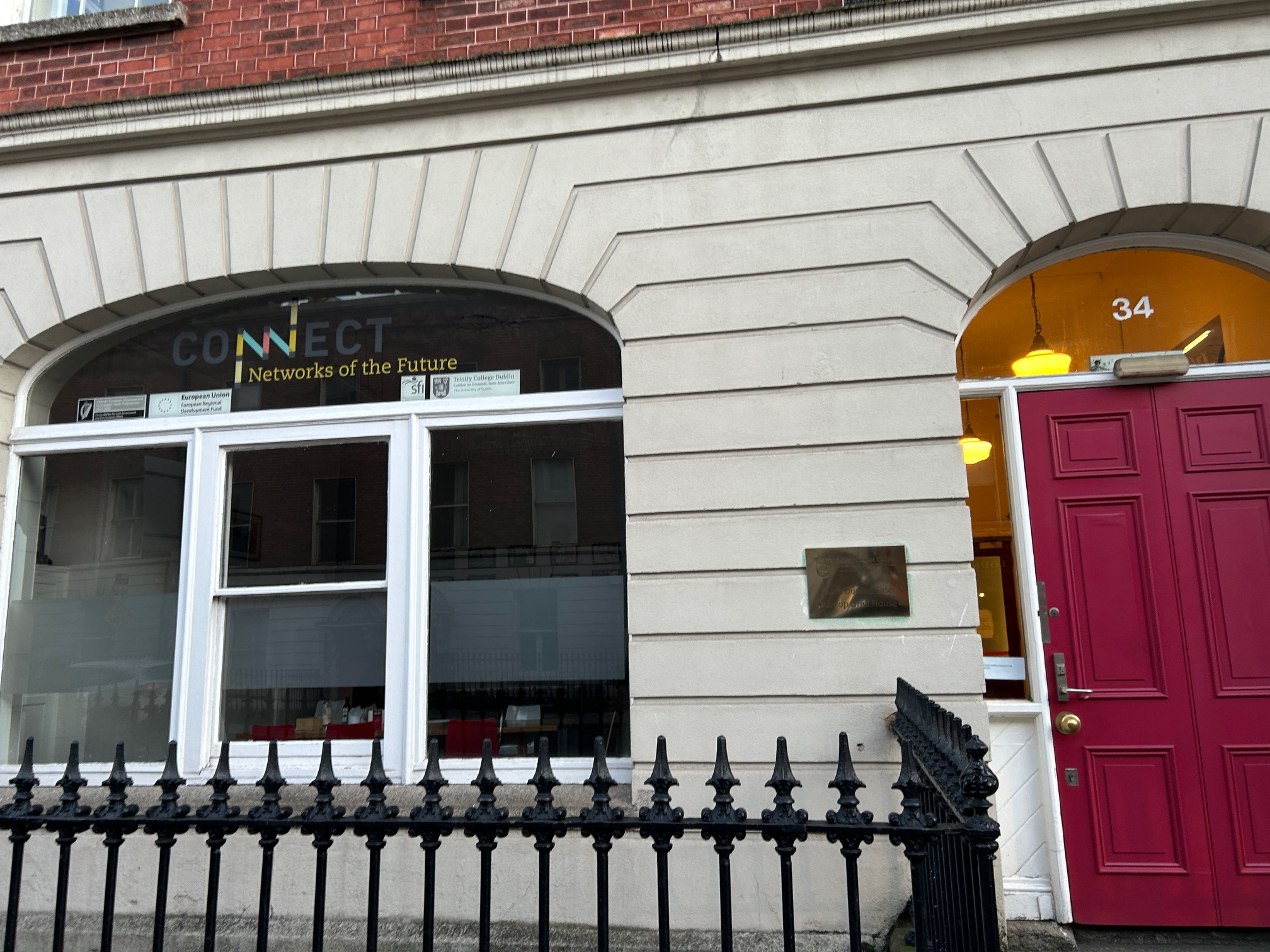
TCD Connect (including CTVR) research centre

After a period of post-doctoral research, Doyle joined the faculty of the Department of Electronic and Electrical Engineering at Trinity College Dublin in the late 1990s. In the late 2000s, while an associate professor, she took up a role as the director of the Centre for Telecommunications Value-chain Research (CTVR), a six-institution telecoms research centre based at TCD. She was made a Fellow of Trinity College Dublin in 2011. In the mid-2010s, she was appointed the first head of a Science Foundation Ireland (SFI)-supported national research centre focused on telecommunications in the future, CONNECT, and the CTVR was later merged into this. CONNECT was expanded over time, with up to 250 researchers working across ten Irish third-level institutions, and its work has included efforts in the areas of converged, dense, shared and moving networks, as well as nano and low-energy networks. Among the projects launched by Doyle were the "Pervasive Nation" LoRa Internet of Things network and, using that system, a flood and river level monitoring initiative with Dublin City Council. The LoRa project secured 1.8 million euro of research funding, and in conjunction with it, CONNECT joined the LoRa alliance as Trinity's delegate. CONNECT also secured as many as 35 cooperative projects with industry. Doyle personally led the Edge project, funded by SFI under the EU Horizon 2020 programme, with a budget of 6 million euro and 71 researchers, conducting work on digital content technology, telecoms networks and advanced materials. She was appointed as, and as of January 2022 remains, a director of two spin-out companies from CTVR and CONNECT, Software Radio Systems and Xcelerit.

In 2014, she was appointed professor of Engineering and the Arts at the School of Computer Science and Statistics at Trinity. By 2017, she was credited with having won career total awards of more than 70 million euro in research funding for her projects and teams, and supervising 26 Ph.D. candidates, half in Engineering, half in Arts. In January 2018 she became the dean of and vice-president for research at the college, a role she held until 2020.

=== Publications ===
Doyle wrote a book on certain radio technologies, released in 2009, in print and as an e-book by Cambridge University Press, Essentials of Cognitive Radio. She was also an advisor in the production of the Science Gallery Dublin "exhibition-in-a-box" volume "Systems : User or Used?" (2021).

Doyle has authored or co-authored a wide range of papers, many peer-reviewed, including her most-cited, in the cognitive radio area, Cyclostationary signatures in practical cognitive radio applications, as well as one on spectrum management, Spectrum without bounds, networks without borders, for which she was the lead author, and Painting style transfer for head portraits using convolutional neural networks which treats of software engineering and the arts together. Some of her more recent co-authored papers include one which brought together two network themes and blockchain, Toward Scalable User-Deployed Ultra-Dense Networks: Blockchain-Enabled Small Cells as a Service (2020), another on spectrum management, as a book chapter with Doyle as lead author, Open Access Markets for Capacity and the Inseparability of Spectrum and Infrastructure (2020), and Low Complexity Modem Structure for OFDM-Based Orthogonal Time Frequency Space Modulation (2017). There have also been publications dealing with technologies outside the conventional mobile network space, such as LoRa in A method to enhance ranging resolution for localization of LoRa sensors (2017), and on applications of neural network technology, including Spectrum Monitoring for Radar Bands Using Deep Convolutional Neural Networks (2017) and A neural-network-based realization of in-network computation for the Internet of Things (2017).

== Board and project roles ==
By the 2010s, Doyle was an advisor to the National Broadband Steering Committee in Ireland, Ofcom's Spectrum Advisory Board in the United Kingdom and the Wireless@KTH project at KTH Royal Institute of Technology in Stockholm, Sweden. She was also chairperson of the board of The Douglas Hyde Gallery (2013–2021) and a member of those of Pallas Studios and the Wireless Innovation Forum. She has also been a judge of Ireland's Young Scientist and Technology Exhibition, and was involved as a board member and in other ways with the Festival of Curiosity, a scientific discovery event for a large audience of children in Dublin.

Doyle has also promoted the engagement of girls with STEAM (science, technology, engineering, the arts and mathematics) subjects, through initiatives such as the Irish Teen Turn, the global Girls in Tech and HerStory. By 2017, she was also a member of the board of Science Gallery International, a network of science outreach initiatives inspired by Science Gallery Dublin, a youth-focused outreach gallery established within the ambit of TCD.

She was also a member of the Scientific Advisory Board of open-access publishing platform Open Research Europe, and of the steering committee of Ireland's National Broadband project, and until 2022 was chairperson of Ofcom's Spectrum Advisory Board.

== Provostship ==
In April 2021, she was elected by a body of 870 staff and 6 students to the role of provost of Trinity College Dublin, now known as Provost and President, the chief officer of the institution, with full responsibility for academic work, operations and finance. The other two candidates in the election were also women, Linda Hogan and Jane Ohlmeyer, paving the way for the first female provost since the founding of the college by Queen Elizabeth I in 1592. After the elimination of one candidate in the first round, Doyle won the second round by 517 votes to 270. She assumed the office on 1 August 2021, moving to the official residence on campus. As provost, Doyle was also made chairperson of the board of Science Gallery Dublin, while remaining a member of that of the Science Gallery International network. Ahead of taking office, Doyle announced her nomination of Prof. Orla Shiels as vice-provost, with nominations of bursar (head of finance), registrar and dean of students in her hands for 1 September also.

There was controversy when, soon after Science Gallery Dublin was included as one of the named projects of a 400 million euro fundraising campaign, and just days after Doyle opened the first exhibition at the gallery since closure due to Covid pandemic restrictions, staff were told that it would close permanently in February 2022, with no prior consultation with workers, State, the public or donors, and a refusal of comment. The past provost, Patrick Prendergast, also chairperson of Science Gallery International, said that closure would be a serious loss, and the gallery's founding chairperson, Chris Horn, commented with regret, and that it was "important that the new Provost, Linda Doyle, understands the public sentiment in favour of growing the Gallery, not closing it…" Doyle tweeted about a positive phone call with the Minister for Higher Education at the end of October, and by January 2022, after talks with Government departments and a comment by the Taoiseach in the Dail, Doyle made clear that the closure would proceed, but that it might reopen with a new working model.

Trinity's student newspaper, The University Times, concluded after Doyle's first semester that she did appear committed to a more transparent operation, and was more accessible than her predecessor but had faced controversy over a slow return to in-person lectures, the Science Gallery closure, and problems with plans for the Trinity East extension project and the temporary relocation of the Book of Kells exhibition.

== Recognition ==
In July 2021, Doyle was named as Cork Person of the Month. She was also the recipient of one of the Irish Tatler Women of the Year Awards in November 2021, for STEM promotion.

Doyle's Wikipedia article was featured in the English-language Wikipedia main page's Did you know...? section on the International Day of Women and Girls in Science (sometimes called International Women in STEM Day), on 11 February 2022.

In 2022, she was elected a member of the Royal Irish Academy.

== Media and public events ==
Prof Doyle delivered a public Davis Lecture in the Davis Now series, on the concept and practicalities of the "smart home", entitled "Bricks, Mortar and Data: Technology and the Home of the Future," at the Union Workhouse, Callan, in 2020. She was one of two respondent speakers at the Design as an Attitude talk by curator Alice Cawthorn at the Dublin Art Book Fair 2020. She delivered the 5th WITS Mary Mulvihill Lecture, entitled Communicating Communications, dealing with STEM outreach, and leadership, at the Provost's House in TCD, 8 November 2021.

== Personal life ==
Doyle's father, Oliver, worked as a compositor for the Cork Examiner for 35 years, while her mother had to leave school at 12 but later pursued women's studies and a course in geology at University College Cork. She has two brothers and a sister, with one brother being a teacher.

Doyle has a domestic partner, Simon Tonge, who has joined her on official duties. She and her partner moved from their house in Glasnevin to the Provost's House, at 1 Grafton Street, Dublin, on one corner of the Trinity campus, the official residence of the provost. Doyle's Cork home is in Union Hall.

Academic offices
Preceded by Patrick Prendergast	Provost of Trinity College Dublin; 2021–present	Incumbent
