= Karlin Lillington =

Technology and business journalist, literary academic

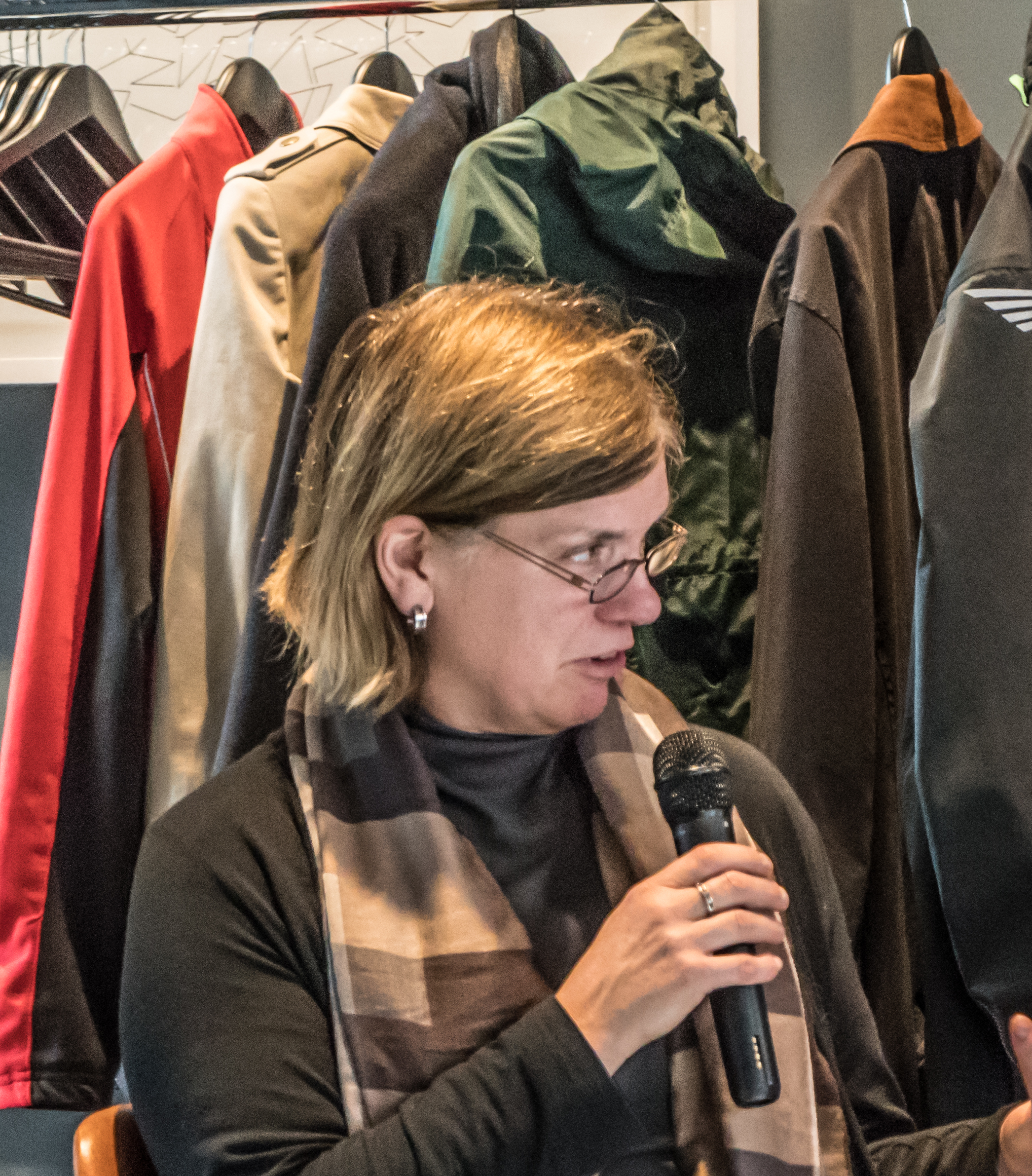
- Lillington in 2015
- Born: 1959 (age 66–67); Canada
- Citizenship: Ireland, US, Canada
- Education: University College Dublin, Trinity College Dublin, UC Santa Barbara
- Occupations: Journalist, academic
- Spouse: Chris Horn
- Writing career
- Language: English
- Years active: 1980–present
- Genre: Non-fiction
- Subjects: Technology and its interaction with business, society and culture; privacy; the poetry of Seamus Heaney
- Notable awards: Outstanding Achievement at University College Dublin Smurfit School Business Journalist Awards
- Website: indigo.ie/~karlin/kjhome.htm

Karlin J. Lillington is an Irish technology and business journalist, notable for her work with The Irish Times, The Guardian, Wired, Salon.com and other newspapers, magazines and online publishers. Born in Canada and raised in California, she holds a PhD in Anglo-Irish Literature from Trinity College Dublin. Her work formed a basis for a judicial appeal in which the European Court of Justice voided the European Union's Data Retention Directive. She has been a member of the board of Ireland's public service broadcaster, Raidió Teilifís Éireann, and was a long-serving member of the advisory board of Dublin's Science Gallery and has served on several arts boards.

== Early life and education ==
Lillington was born in Canada, and moved to California at an early age. Her father, Dr Glen Lillington, a half-Icelandic Canadian, from Winnipeg, was a professor of respiratory medicine at Stanford University and UC Davis. Her mother, Ellen (née Place), married Glen in 1957, and they settled in California in 1960, living in Palo Alto then the college town of Davis, and moving to Menlo Park on his retirement. Karlin is the eldest of three children, the others being boys.

Lillington studied at the University of California from the late-1970s, at UC Santa Barbara. She took a degree in literature, and later worked, for about a decade, towards a PhD in Anglo-Irish literature, with a focus on the poetry of Seamus Heaney.

She visited Ireland to pursue postgraduate studies in Anglo-Irish Literature at University College Dublin, reading for an M.A. After this, she transferred to Trinity College Dublin where she read for an M.Phil. in Anglo-Irish Literature, her 1987 dissertation being, Borrow the longship's swimming tongue: Scandinavian imagery in Wintering Out and North. She hosted Heaney on a visit he made to California in the early 1990s. She published her PhD thesis, Gender and metaphor in the poetry of Seamus Heaney, at TCD in 1995.

== Career ==
=== Early stages ===
She secured her first e-mail account and pre-World Wide Web Internet access in the mid-1990s as a graduate student at Trinity College Dublin, and her interest in matters of technology developed in part from this. She had worked in student journalism at UC Santa Barbara, including holding the post of managing editor of The Daily Nexus paper, and its biweekly magazine, Portal. Lillington taught at San Jose State University in the early 1990s, while pursuing her PhD. She began to work in professional journalism while waiting to defend her PhD thesis in Ireland.

=== The Irish Times ===
Her work for The Irish Times, comprising hundreds of pieces, dates back to at least 1996. The first article in the paper's archives was on the arts, specifically the launch of the Oxford Companion to Irish Literature, while the majority were on the interface of technology with society and business. She has, however, also written in other areas, and sometimes followed up on such pieces, writing, for example, on the need for greater animal welfare control of puppy and horse breeding in 2004, and, frustrated that her article was still widely quoted because the problems had not changed, returning to the topic in 2017.

Lillington achieved prominence as the paper's technology correspondent, and in Prof. Terence Brown's detailed history and review of the Irish Times and its influence as Ireland's newspaper of record, he credited Lillington with a broad public impact: "information technology in the 2000s became a major news story ... reported on expertly in the Irish Times by Karlin Lillington, a young Californian who had come to Ireland to study its literature, who had carved out a career for herself explaining the communications revolution to the Irish public. Middle-aged readers were familiarized in her lively columns with the argot of a new field: 'spam', 'identity fraud', 'downloads', 'search engine', ..." Brown further highlighted a selection of her articles, including "Our Past Is Not So Far Behind Us", which mused on Ireland's past emigration situation, and the new technology multinationals, on the potential conflict between blogging and journalism, and on the conflict between Ireland's need for immigrants to power "new economy"-based growth and fears of the potential impact of such migration.

=== The Guardian and others ===
Lillington wrote regularly for The Guardian from at least 1997. She has also produced articles for Wired, New Scientist, Salon.com, Red Herring, the Sunday Business Post, the Sunday Times and many other outlets. She wrote an extensive essay, Ireland, Technology and the Language of the Future for journal The Irish Review.

=== Technology and the arts ===
Lillington has written one-off pieces which bring together her literary studies and technology, such as a discussion around James Joyce and the concept of hypertext, and on the digital arts, including an interview with the founding director of the Arthouse Multimedia Centre, Aileen MacKeogh, and a later article on the demise of Arthouse. She has been a speaker at many conferences and summer schools, including the Government of Ireland's invitation-only Digital Summit and the MacGill Summer School.

=== Social media and privacy ===
Lillington has raised a number of privacy concerns, especially around social media, and also online platform nuisance issues, and cancelled her account on LinkedIn over the latter. Her work also grounded the Digital Rights Ireland appeal to the European Court of Justice which resulted in the voiding of the EU Data Retention Directive. In 2018 she was one of the expert witnesses called before the Grand International Committee on Disinformation, and the Oireachtas Joint Committee on Communications, Climate Action and Environment, speaking about security and privacy risks.

=== Media appearances and podcasts ===
Lillington has also appeared on BBC and RTÉ radio, and on television with RTÉ and TV3. In 2009 she produced her own series of podcasts, technoculture, including interviews with Chris Horn of IONA Technologies and leading designer Professor Anthony Dunne of Dunne & Raby, and has participated in other podcasts, such as a memorial for Mary Mulvihill with Róisín Ingle, and two concerning pets.

== Voluntary and public service roles ==
Lillington served as a member of the Leonardo Group, the advisory board of Dublin's Science Gallery, from its foundation year, 2008. She has also served a term as a ministerial appointee on the board of Ireland's national public service broadcaster, Raidió Teilifís Éireann (RTÉ), and on the board of the Dublin International Piano Competition. She has also been a judge for the Mary Mulvihill Award. She is, as of 2026, chair of the board of the contemporary music festival, New Music Dublin. She has also spoken, with Chris Horn, for the Front Line Defenders human rights charity.

== Recognition ==
Lillington was awarded the Outstanding Achievement Award at the University College Dublin Smurfit School Business Journalist Awards in 2019.

== Personal life ==
As of the 2000s, Lillington lived in Dublin, and in 2018, after over 30 years of full or partial residence, became an Irish citizen, writing an account of her citizenship ceremony for the Irish Times. Jointly with Chris Horn, her husband as of 2021, she has been a senior sponsor of the Irish National Opera since its launch year. She has written and managed a specialist site for Cavalier King Charles Spaniels; and founded a Cavalier King Charles Spaniel rescue charity; she did a podcast on this in 2017.
