= Regius Professor of Civil Engineering and Mechanics =

The Regius Chair of Civil Engineering and Mechanics at the University of Glasgow was founded in 1840 by Queen Victoria.

In 1872 the endowment was increased by the bequest of Isabella Elder in memory of her husband, John Elder. The name of the chair was shortened to Regius Chair of Civil Engineering on the appointment of William Marshall in 1952, but the original name was restored upon the appointment of René de Borst in 2012.

De Borst left the chair in 2015 towards Sheffield and left it vacated for six years. In 2021, Margaret Lucas became the eleventh incumbent and first female Regius Professor of engineering in Glasgow.

== Regius Professors of Civil Engineering and Mechanics ==
- 1840 - Lewis Gordon
- 1855 - William Rankine
- 1873 - James Thompson
- 1889 - Archibald Barr
- 1913 - John Dewar Cormack
- 1936 - Gilbert Cook
- 1952 - William Marshall
- 1977 - Alexander Coull
- 1994 - Nenad Bicanic
- 2012 - René de Borst
- 2021 - Margaret Lucas

== See also ==
- List of Professorships at the University of Glasgow
- Professor of Civil Engineering (Dublin)
