= Chris Horn =

Chris Horn may refer to:

- Chris Horn (American football)
- Chris Horn (computer scientist)
- Chris Horn (racing driver)
