= Margaret Lucas =

Margaret Lucas may refer to:

- Margaret Lucas (engineer)
- Margaret Bright Lucas (1818–1890), suffragist
- Margaret Cavendish, Duchess of Newcastle-upon-Tyne (c. 1623–1673), née Lucas, writer, scientist and aristocrat
