= Caitríona Lally =

Professor of Bioengineering

- Occupation: Professor of Bioengineering

Academic background
- Education: University of Limerick
- Alma mater: Trinity College Dublin
- Doctoral advisor: Patrick Prendergast

Academic work
- Discipline: Bioengineering
- Sub-discipline: Biomedical engineering
- Institutions: Trinity College Dublin

Caitríona Lally is a professor of Bioengineering in Trinity College, Dublin. She has been a qualified mechanical engineer since 1997. She did a PhD in cardiovascular biomechanics.

== Education ==
Lally studied mechanical engineering in the University of Limerick, achieving a first-class honours degree (1993 – 1997). She earned a Master’s of Bioengineering and Biomechanical Engineering at the University of Limerick (1997 – 1999). Lally got her PhD from Trinity College Dublin, in arterial biomechanics and cardiovascular stenting, linked with Medtronic (2000 – 2004); she wrote her thesis and did her research under Patrick Prendergast, the then Professor of Biomechanical Engineering.

In her third year in UL, she spent 9 months on work placement in Stryker, which is one of the largest orthopaedic implant companies in the world. It was on this placement where she realised that she could apply her mechanical engineering to medicine and biology.

== Career ==
After completing her PhD, she became a lecturer in Biomedical Engineering in the Dublin City University (DCU). She worked as a lecturer in biomedical engineering for over 10 years (March 2004 – October 2014), before becoming a senior lecturer in Biomedical Engineering in DCU. Lally became a Professor in Bioengineering at Trinity College Dublin where she lectures and conducts research (2015 – Present).

She has continued her research from her time in DCU and she is working with the Centre for Advanced Medical Imaging in St. James’s Hospital. Lally is the lead investigator on a project, focusing on developing a means of early diagnosis of degenerative cardiovascular diseases.

== Research ==
Lally has published over 50 papers, receiving over 1800 citations. Her research focuses on arterial tissue mechanics, vascular imaging, vascular mechanobiology and tissue engineering. In 2014, she secured an ERC (European Research Council) starting grant for a five-year €1.5m project that will advance research in arterial fibre remodelling for vascular disease diagnosis and tissue engineering.

== Publications ==
Her publications include:

In Vitro Corrosion and Biological Assessment of Bioabsorbable WE43 Mg Alloy Specimens.

A strain-mediated corrosion model for bioabsorbable metallic stents.

Fibre orientation of fresh and frozen porcine aorta determined non-invasively using diffusion tensor imaging.

== Personal life and activism ==
Lally features in the group portrait at the Women on Walls campaign by Accenture with the Royal Irish Academy. Lally also features on Silicon Republic’s list of ‘25 of Ireland’s phenomenal women of engineering’.

== Awards and honors ==
2004: Royal Society of Medicine in Ireland, 1st prize student paper

2005: Career Start Grant (DCU)

2012: IMECHE Young Engineers Research Award
