= Professor of Civil Engineering (Dublin) =

Professorship at Trinity College Dublin

The Professor of Civil Engineering is a professorship at Trinity College Dublin. The chair was founded in 1842, thirty years before the establishment of the college's first degree programme in civil engineering. It is one of the oldest chairs in civil engineering at any university, surpassed in the British Isles only by the 1840 establishment of the Regius Professor of Civil Engineering and Mechanics at the University of Glasgow. It was previously styled Professorship of the Practice of Engineering in the mid-nineteenth century and Professorship of Engineering from 1960 to 1985. The title was restored to Professor of Civil Engineering in 1986 following the creation in 1980 of new Chairs in Engineering Science.

== Succession of Professors of Civil Engineering ==
- 1: John Benjamin Macneill (1842–1852; Professor Extraordinary of Civil Engineering 1852–1880)
- 2: Samuel Downing (1852–1882)
- 3: Robert Crawford (1882–1887)
- 4: Thomas Alexander (1887–1921)
- 5: David Clark (1921–1933)
- 6: John Purser (1933–1957)
- 7: William Wright (1957–1985)
- 8: Simon Perry (1986–2002)
- 9: Margaret O'Mahony (2006)

== Professors of Engineering Science ==
Following the reorganisation of the School of Engineering into three departments in 1980, two new Professorships in Engineering Science were created. The Foundation Chair was retained by the Department of Civil, Structural and Environmental Engineering.

=== Chair of Electronic Engineering (1980) ===
==== Professors of Engineering Science ====
- 1: Maurice Whelan (1981-1991; Professor of Industrial Electronics 1991-1994)
- 2: Frank Boland (1994-2016; vacant 2016-2020)

==== Professor of Electronic Engineering ====
- 3: Anil Kokaram (2020-present)

=== Chair of Mechanical Engineering (1980) ===
==== Professors of Engineering Science ====
- 1: Paul Wallace (1980–1981)
- 2: David Talpin (1982-1986)

==== Professors of Mechanical and Manufacturing Engineering ====
- 2: David Talpin (1986-1992)
- 3: John Fitzpatrick (1992-1998)

==== Professors of Mechanical Engineering ====
- 3: John Fitzpatrick (1998-2012; vacant 2012-2020)
- 4: Stephen Spence (2020-present)

== See also ==
- School of Engineering (Trinity College Dublin)
