= Women in Technology and Science =

Irish organization representing women working in STEM

Women in Science and Technology
- Formation: 1990
- Founder: Mary Mulvihill
- Chair: Andrea Johnson
- Website: www.witsireland.com

Women in Technology and Science (or WITS) is an Irish organisation representing women working in science and technology. It accepts members from industry and academia, and of all ages, from students to professionals. It was founded in 1990 by Mary Mulvihill.

WITS organises a monthly e-mail newsletter WITSWORDS Newsletters. They have undertaken various initiatives, including compiling the WITS Talent Bank, a list of more than 150 women working in science and technology, and the Re-Enter initiative to support women returning to the workforce after a career break. A group from WITS attended a reception hosted by President Michael D. Higgins at Áras an Uachtaráin to recognise Women in Science in January 2016. In November 2020 they celebrated 30 years of activity.

WITS is run by an elected executive committee. Chairs of WITS have included Mary Mulvihill, Dr Ena Prosser, Sadhbh McCarthy, Dr Marion Palmer, Mary Carroll and Julie Hogan. Members include Aoibhinn Ní Shúilleabháin, Jane Grimson and Norah Patten.

== Gallery ==
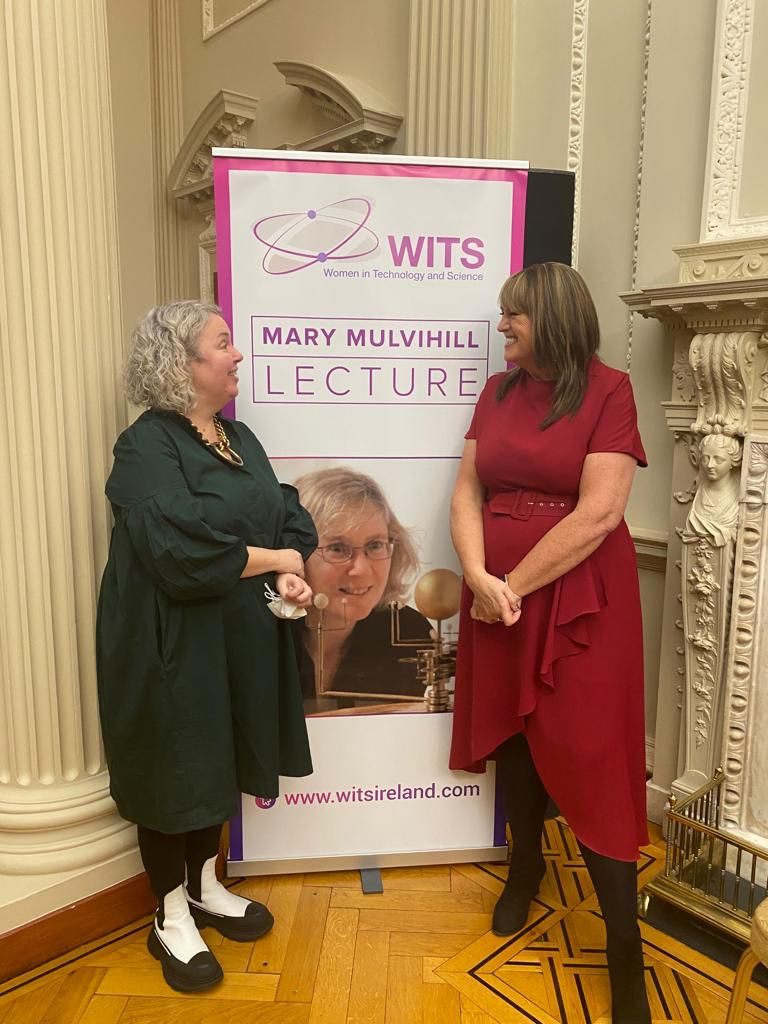
Mary Mulvihill Lecture 2021, showing speaker Linda Doyle and WITS chair, Andrea Johnson

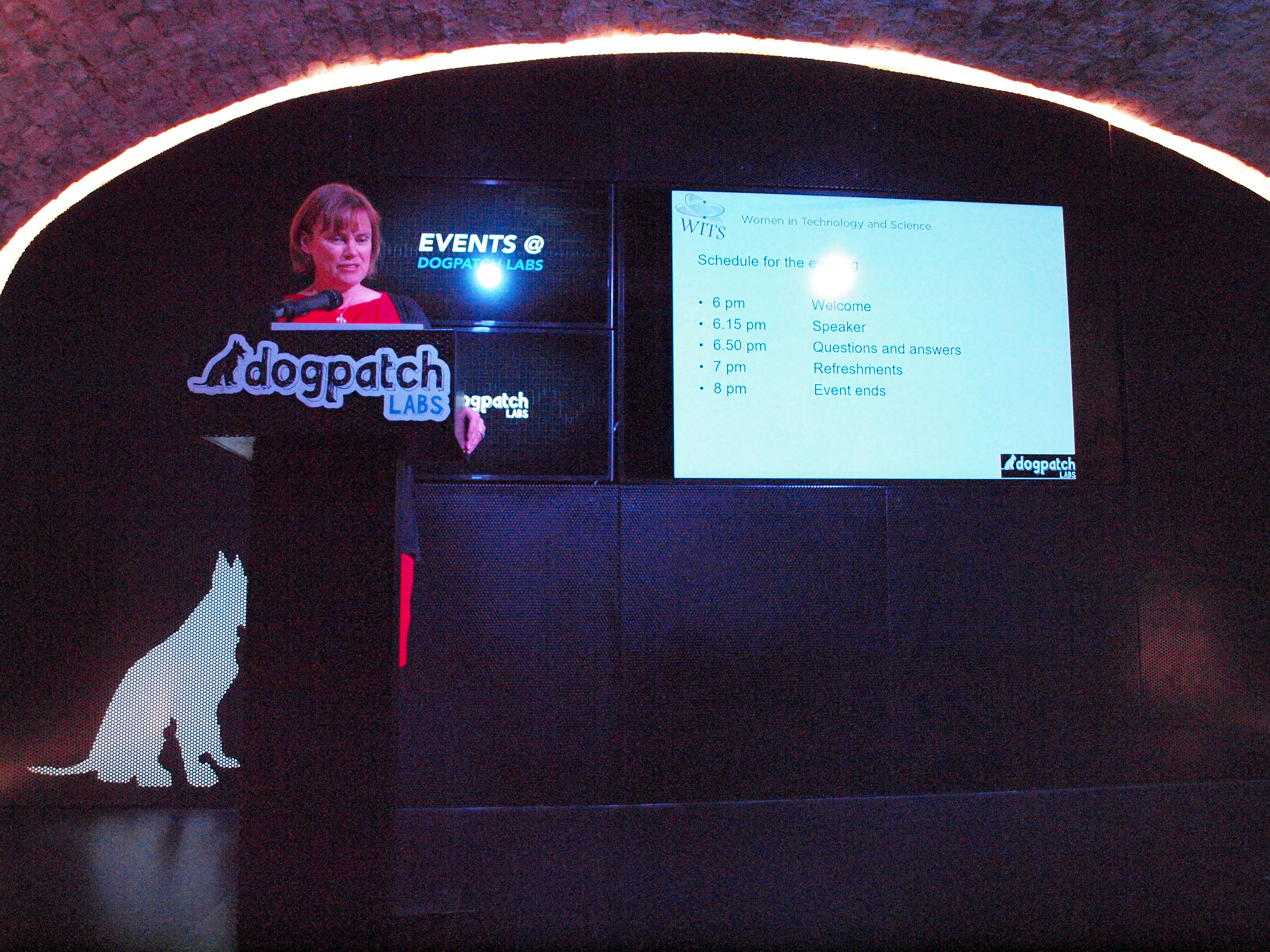
Mary Mulvihill Lecture 2017, opened by Mary Carroll, chair of WITS
