= Science Gallery =

International group of public science centres

Science Gallery is an international group of public science centres, developed from a concept by a group connected to Trinity College Dublin in Ireland. The first Science Gallery was opened in 2008 and housed in the Naughton Institute at Trinity College.

Each gallery was operated by a major academic institution in partnership with 'Science Gallery International. Each holds various artistic exhibitions and lectures with a view to science outreach and art-science collaborations. Unlike most science centres, they have no permanent collections, but rather a series of three to four temporary exhibitions each year. Five galleries were established by the end of 2020, with several more planned.

== Locations ==
| Location | Partner institution | Opening Date |
|---|---|---|
| Dublin, Ireland | Trinity College Dublin | 2008–2022 |
| Detroit, United States | Michigan State University | 2018–2022 |
| London, United Kingdom | King's College London | 2018 |
| Melbourne, Australia | University of Melbourne | 2020 |
| Venice, Italy | Ca' Foscari University of Venice | 2020 |
| Bengaluru, India | Government of Karnataka | 2024 |
| Atlanta, United States | Emory University | Planned for 2022 |
| Rotterdam, Netherlands | Erasmus MC | Planned for 2023 |
| Berlin, Germany | TU Berlin | Planned for 2024 |

== Science Gallery Dublin ==
Science Gallery Dublin
- Gailearaí Eolaíochta
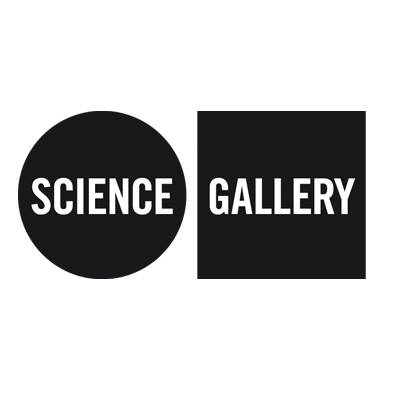

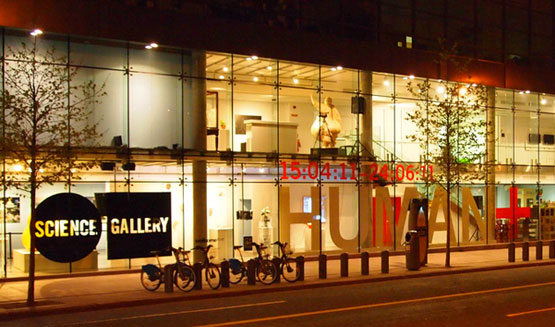
- Science Gallery at night

- Location within Central Dublin
- Established: 1 February 2008
- Location: Naughton Institute, Trinity College Dublin, Ireland
- Coordinates: 53.3442°N 6.2504°W
- Type: Science centre
- Visitors: >3.8 million visitors (2008-2020)
- Director: Gerard McHugh (acting)
- Chairperson: Linda Doyle
- Public transit access: Dublin Pearse railway station
- Website: dublin.sciencegallery.com

=== Mission ===
The goal of the gallery was to host a programme of "innovative and interactive exhibitions, workshops, events and debate", and to work at the "dynamic intersection where science and art collide", to engage people – especially aged 15–25 – with science and technology.

=== Location ===
Science Gallery Dublin was physically located within the Naughton Institute building at Trinity College Dublin, which opened in early 2008. It could be accessed from an entrance on Pearse Street, and featured large display windows on the street, near Westland Row and its DART station.

=== Establishment ===
The idea of a public outreach facility was developed in 2005, championed by Prof. Mike Coey, who was invited to be a resident scientist at the Naughton Institute building under construction on the corner of Westland Row and Pearse Street. The building was planned to house a nanotechnology centre, a research facility called CRANN, and a sports hall, and the gallery space was proposed to occupy 1,200 m^{2} (13,000 sq ft) of the glass-fronted space facing Pearse Street, with spaces for exhibitions and a lecture theatre for talks on the impact of science on society. The fundraising committee was led by entrepreneur, TCD graduate and former academic Chris Horn.

The gallery opened on 2 February 2012. The proposed funding model was a partnership between the university or universities, industry and government, supporting a free admission model to maximise public, and especially youth, engagement.

=== Governance and staffing ===
The gallery had a governing board. The inaugural board having been chaired by Chris Horn, as of 2021 it was led by Trinity's provost; the status of the board after closure was not clarified.

At launch, Michael John Gorman was the gallery's director and Lynn Scarff was Education and Outreach manager. Scarff subsequently served as director from 2014 to 2018, before moving to assume the directorship of the National Museum of Ireland. Ann Mulrooney was then appointed as director in December 2018.

As of October 2021, the gallery had a staff of 16, led by an acting director, Gerard McHugh.

==== Advisory groups ====
The gallery had an advisory council, the Leonardo Group, comprising figures from the worlds of science and technology, education and the arts, as well as media and business. Members include notable academics Aoife McLysaght, Emma Teeling, Aoibhinn Ní Shúilleabháin, Shane O'Mara, journalists Karlin Lillington and Will Goodbody, and senator Lynn Ruane. There is also a group for younger advisors, the Young Leos, which contributed to gallery considerations around, among other things, themes for exhibitions, marketing and social media, and other educational opportunities.

=== Operations ===
Exhibitions were staffed by mediators, who helped explain the displays to visitors, and supported interaction. The gallery had its own café, and a shop. It was part-funded by Trinity College, by profits from the shop and cafe, and by sponsorship for specific exhibitions, as well as a grant from the Department of Arts, stated to be at the level of 280,000 euro per annum for some years. It received funding and support from Google from an early stage. Its income in the year to September 2020 was 552,000 euro, and to September 2019, 592,000 euro.

In 2011 the gallery attracted 242,000 visitors, while in 2014 that had risen to 400,000, by the end of which time it had seen a total of 1.8 million visitors (February 2008 to December 2014); this had risen to over 3.8 million visitors by 2020.

==== Exhibitions ====
Science Gallery Dublin hosted a number of exhibitions, of varying duration, every year. The gallery's opening show, from 2–11 February 2008, was Lightwave, billed as a "festival with installations ... by leading engineers, scientists, lighting designers and artists". This event featured work by astrophysicist Peter Gallagher and artist Anna Hill, along others, "interactive clothing", audience games and a feature on the sight of bees. It went on to host 48 other shows, including shows on the intersection of fashion and science, along with one on the way we perceive - Seeing - and another on the future of work - Humans Need Not Apply. During the period of Covid-related closure, two exhibitions were presented virtually, and one in the windows of the gallery, on Pearse St.

A component of a number of the exhibitions was the ability for the public to participate in ongoing research. Examples of this were the collection of data on the water consumption and showering habits of visitors to the Home/Sick exhibition WashLab.

=== Recognition and strategic fundraising ===
The gallery was featured on a limited edition 2015 An Post stamp, which was part of a series along with the BT Young Scientist and Technology Exhibition, celebrating recent Irish scientific achievements.

Up until at least May 2022, Science Gallery Dublin was one of the 14 targets for Trinity's major fundraising and volunteering campaign, Inspiring Generations, launched in 2019 to raise 400 million euro and secure 150,000 hours of volunteer effort, to support the university strategically.

=== Closure ===
On 28 October 2021 - just days after Trinity College's new provost, Linda Doyle, chairperson of Science Gallery Dublin's board, opened the first exhibition since closure due to Covid pandemic restrictions - staff were informed that the gallery would close in February 2022. No consultation had occurred, no public announcement was made, and neither the university nor its provost's office were willing to comment. Previous provost Patrick Prendergast commented that closure would be a serious loss.

Following strong negative reaction to the planned closure, including from professors such as McLysaght and the gallery's founding chairperson, Chris Horn, the provost posted a Tweet on 29 October referencing a positive phone call with the Minister for Higher Education. A meeting was planned with two government departments to discuss options, and following this, the College Board decided to continue to explore options for "reimagining" the gallery. Trinity, having initially refused to comment on the matter, released a statement on 3 November, noting that grants and donations had dropped since 2017, and that the gallery had accumulated losses of 1.65 million euro. On 26 January 2022, the Taoiseach commented in the Dail that the university must work "to develop a new vision and a sustainable financial model for the long-term future of its Science Gallery" and noted that two Government departments had offered bridging funding for some years to allow a new model to be launched. Despite the various discussions and offer of State help, the gallery did close, as originally announced, at the end of February 2022.

=== Relaunch plans ===
In November 2022, it was announced that a tender would be issued for assistance in preparing the gallery to reopen in 2023, with an exhibition plan from 2023 to 2028, and pursuit of external funding partners. Trinity appointed a creative consultancy company called Curiosity Studio to devise and implement a new operational model for the gallery. Reopening was expected in summer 2023, but did not occur. In December 2024, Trinity announced that, after the failure to find a sustainable business model, the Science Gallery would not reopen and the space would be used instead for a dedicated student centre.

== Science Gallery International ==
Science Gallery International (SGI) was established in 2012 with the goal of establishing a Science Gallery Network with eight nodes by 2020, based on the success of the original Science Gallery at Trinity College Dublin. It was supported by Google and the Wellcome Trust. Governed by a voluntary board, and led by Executive Director Dr. Andrea Bandelli, the SGI team is based in Dublin.

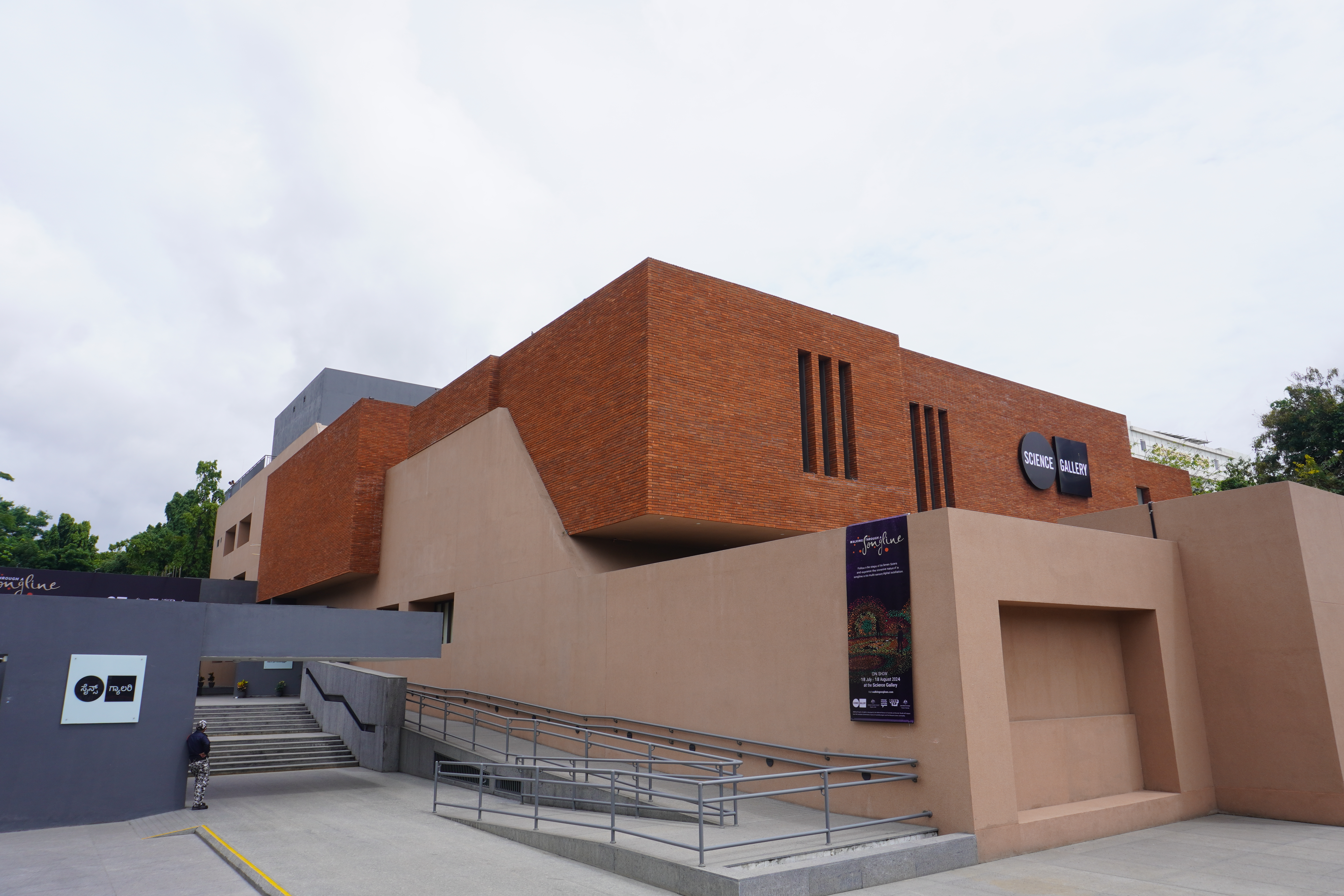
Science Gallery Bengaluru

SGI creates and manages tools and resources, certain forms of technology, and materials, and facilitates knowledge-sharing and inter-location support, for the members of the Science Gallery Network. These tools and initiatives help enable member universities in operating the Science Gallery concept, and ensure that each Gallery benefits its host university in a broader sense.

Preceded by some ad hoc Science Gallery exhibitions, the first new gallery was planned for King's College London in 2016 and opened in September 2018. In 2014, the plans for a Science Gallery in Bangalore, India were announced, with the gallery planned to open in 2018, but later delayed to 2022. Science Gallery Melbourne with the University of Melbourne was announced in 2016 and opened in 2020. The SGI had an agreement to open a gallery with the City College of New York and in late 2016 announced Science Gallery Venice with Ca' Foscari in Venice.

Science Gallery International ceased operations in June 2026, with responsibility for governance of the centres being permanently transferred to the remaining individual galleries themselves.

== Science Gallery London ==
=== Establishment and location ===
Plans to open a permanent Science Gallery in London were first announced in 2013. Prior to this, occasional Science Gallery exhibitions were held in temporary locations within King's College. Science Gallery London opened in September 2018 in Boland House, Guy's Campus, King's College London as part of a £30M redevelopment of the original 18th-century entrance to Guy's Hospital.

=== Exhibitions ===
The opening exhibition at Science Gallery London was Hooked: When Want Becomes Need exploring themes of addiction and recovery. It ran from September 2018 to January 2019 and included work by Richard Billingham, Dryden Goodwin, Joachim Koester, Olivia Locher, Rachel Maclean, Melanie Manchot and Natasha Caruana.
