= Archibald Barr =

Scottish engineer and businessman (1855–1931)

Archibald Barr FRS FRSE
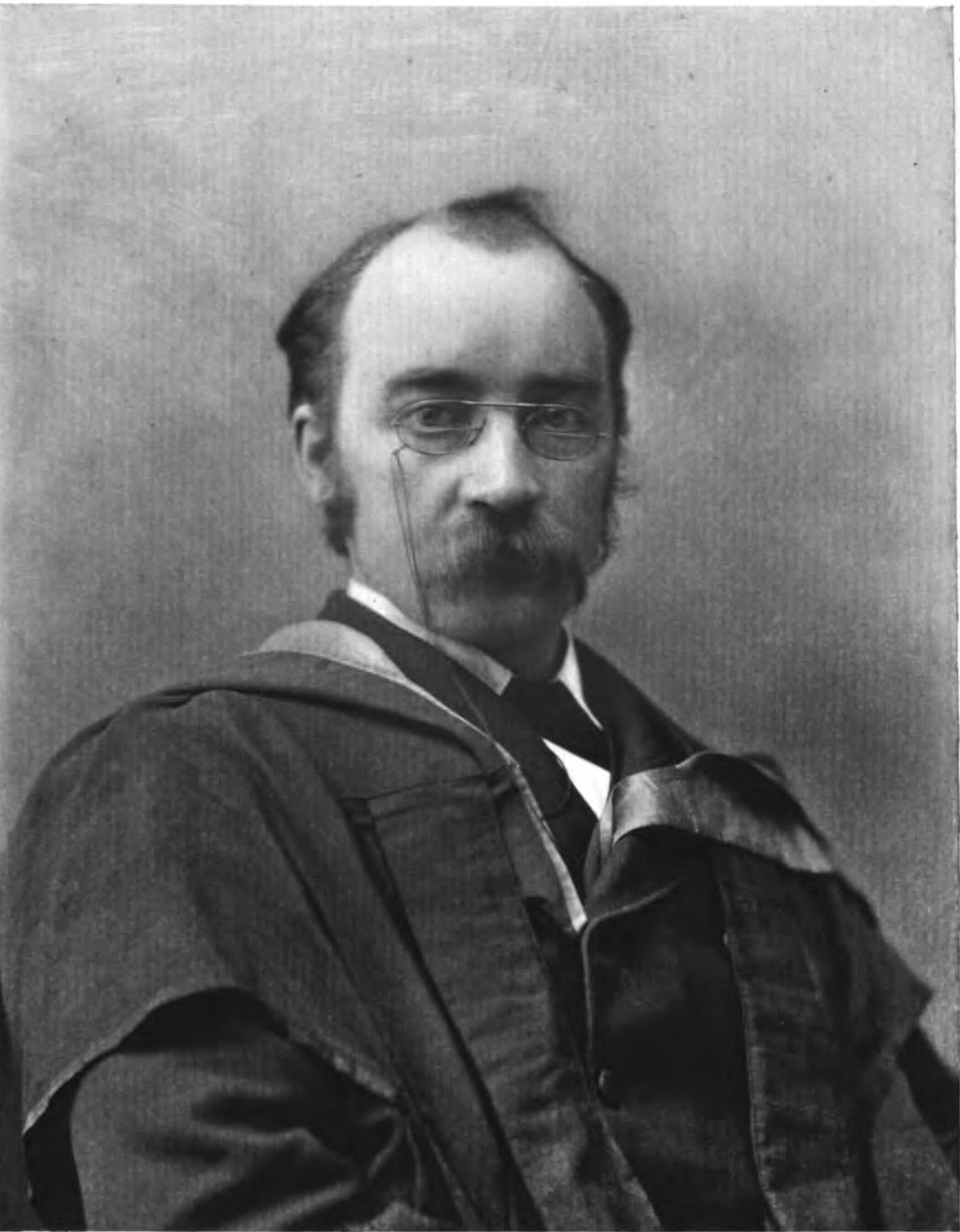
- Born: 18 November 1855; Glenfield House
- Died: 5 August 1931 (aged 75)
- Education: Paisley Grammar School; University of Glasgow
- Occupations: engineer; inventor; businessman
- Title: President of: Royal Philosophical Society; Institution of Engineers and Shipbuilders in Scotland; Scottish Aeronautical Society; Optical Society, London
- Spouse: Isabella Young
- Parents: Archibald Barr (father); Jeanie Stirrat (mother)

Archibald Barr LLD, FRS FRSE (18 November 1855, Glenfield House, Paisley, Renfrewshire – 5 August 1931) was a Scottish scientific engineer, inventor and businessman. He was a co-founder of Barr & Stroud, and invented the Barr & Stroud Rangefinder.

== Early life and education ==
Barr was born in Glenfield House in Abbey, near Paisley, the third son of Archibald Barr, a yarn merchant, and Jeanie Stirrat, Barr was educated at Paisley Grammar School and apprenticed as an engineer to A F Craig & Co in Paisley before attending University of Glasgow to study engineering.

== Academic career ==
Barr first worked as assistant to James Thomson, Regius Professor of Civil Engineering and Mechanics at Glasgow, a post Barr was to attain himself later in his career. In 1884 he was appointed to the chair of Civil and Mechanical Engineering at the Yorkshire College (which became the University of Leeds in 1904). In 1889 he returned to Glasgow as Regius Professor of Engineering.

In 1898 he successfully campaigned for a new chair in Electrical Engineering at Glasgow University. In 1901 he raised £54,000 to build and equip the James Watt Engineering Building at Glasgow University.

== Other activities ==
Barr was a motoring enthusiast and as a member of the Scottish Automobile Club, he participated as an organiser of Scotland's first motor car reliability trials in 1901. He also helped to form the Scottish Aeronautical Club in 1909, becoming its president, and was a promoter of Scotland's first aviation meeting, held at Lanark in 1910.

He served as President of the Institution of Engineers and Shipbuilders in Scotland in 1910–11. Barr was also a governor of the Royal Scottish National Institution for the care of those with learning difficulties.

He also gifted £8,000 towards the cost of a new organ for Paisley Abbey.

== Honours ==
Barr was awarded the honorary degree of Doctor of Laws (LLD) by Glasgow upon his retirement in 1915. He was elected a Fellow of the Royal Society (FRS) in 1923.

== Marriage ==
Barr married Isabella Young in 1885.

== Death ==
Barr died at his home, Westerton of Mugdock, near Milngavie, near Glasgow, on 5 August 1931 at the age of 75.

== Positions held ==
- President of the Royal Philosophical Society (Glasgow)
- President of the Institution of Engineers and Shipbuilders in Scotland
- President of the Scottish Aeronautical Society
- President of the Optical Society, London
