= Linda Hogan (ethicist) =

Irish Ecumenist & Ethicist

- Born: 1964 (age 61–62)
- Citizenship: Republic of Ireland

Academic background
- Education: National University of Ireland Maynooth; St Patrick's College, Maynooth; Trinity College Dublin

Academic work
- Discipline: Ethicist
- Sub-discipline: Applied ethics; Christian ethics; political ethics; business ethics; intercultural ethics; human rights; gender studies; ecumenism
- Institutions: University of Chester; University of Leeds; Trinity College Dublin

Linda F. Hogan (born 1964) is an Irish ethicist, ecumenist and academic, specialising in Christian ethics, political ethics, human rights, gender, and ecumenism. She is Professor of Ecumenics at Trinity College Dublin, where she was also its vice-provost from 2011 to 2016. She worked as a lecturer at the University of Chester and University of Leeds before joining the staff of Trinity College, Dublin.

== Early life and education ==
Hogan is from Callan, County Kilkenny, Ireland. She was educated at St. Brigid's College, an all-girls Catholic school in Callan. She studied history and theology at National University of Ireland Maynooth and St Patrick's College, Maynooth (a Catholic seminary and pontifical university that shares NUIM's campus), graduating with a Bachelor of Arts (BA) degree. She remained at Maynooth to study for a two-year Master of Arts (MA) degree. Then moved to Trinity College Dublin, to undertake research in theology for her Doctor of Philosophy (PhD) degree, which she completed in 1991.

== Academic career ==
Hogan began her academic career as a lecturer in ethics and religion at the University of Chester, England, for the 1992/93 academic year. During this time, she met Fr James F. Keenan, a Jesuit and ethicist: together, they would found the Catholic Theological Ethics in the World Church in 2003. After a year teaching at Chester, she moved to the University of Leeds, England, as a lecturer in gender, ethics and religion in its Department of Theology and Religious Studies. She was part of the university's Centre for Gender and Women's Studies and its Centre for Business Ethics.

In 2001, Hogan returned to Trinity College, Dublin as a lecturer in its School of Ecumenics. She was a visiting professor at the Sydney College of Divinity and the Melbourne College of Divinity in 2005. In 2006, she was awarded the Chair of Ecumenics, and served as Head of School and Director of the Irish School of Ecumenics from 2006 to 2010. From 2011 to 2016, she was Vice-Provost and Chief Academic Officer of Trinity College Dublin. In 2021 she was a candidate for the role of provost, the head of the university, when the position was being considered for one of three women, including Linda Doyle and Jane Ohlmeyer, making it the first time a woman was provost since the founding of the college: Doyle was subsequently elected.

=== Views ===
In 2012, Hogan was a sponsor of the Catholic Scholars' Declaration on Authority in the Church: amongst other things, this called for more autonomy for bishops, active laity involvement in church governance, and democracy in the selection of bishops and other church leaders.

In reference to the 2015 referendum on same-sex marriage, Hogan argued that there was no theological impediment to same-sex civil marriage and that the "Christian tradition affirms the fundamental equality and dignity of all people, whether we are heterosexual or gay".

== Honours ==
In 2007, she was made a Fellow of Trinity College, Dublin, an honorary appointment. In 2013, media reports suggested that Pope Francis might appoint her as the first female cardinal of the Roman Catholic Church. She had been nominated by Fr James Keenan SJ. In 2023 she was elected a member of the Royal Irish Academy.

== Selected works ==
- From Women’s Experience to Feminist Theology (1998) Sheffield Academic Press, Sheffield ISBN 978-1850755203
- Confronting the Truth: Conscience in the Catholic tradition (2000) Paulist Press, New York, NY ISBN 978-0809139811
- Biggar, Nigel; Hogan, Linda, eds. (2009). Religious voices in public places. Oxford: Oxford University Press. ISBN 978-0199566624.
- Hogan, Linda; Lehrke, Dylan Lee, eds. (2009). Religion and the Politics of Peace and Conflict. Eugene, OR: Pickwick Publications. ISBN 978-1498250023.
- Hogan, Linda F.; Orobator, A. E., eds. (2014). Feminist Catholic Theological Ethics: Conversations in the World Church (Catholic Theological Ethics in the World Church). Ossining, NY: Orbis Books. ISBN 978-1626980785.
- Keeping Faith with Human Rights (Moral Traditions series) (2015) Georgetown University Press, Washington, DC ISBN 978-1626162327

Academic offices
Preceded by Patrick Prendergast	Vice-Provost of Trinity College Dublin; 2011 to 2016	Succeeded by Chris Morash
