= René de Borst =

Dutch civil engineer (born 1958)

René de Borst FREng FRSE
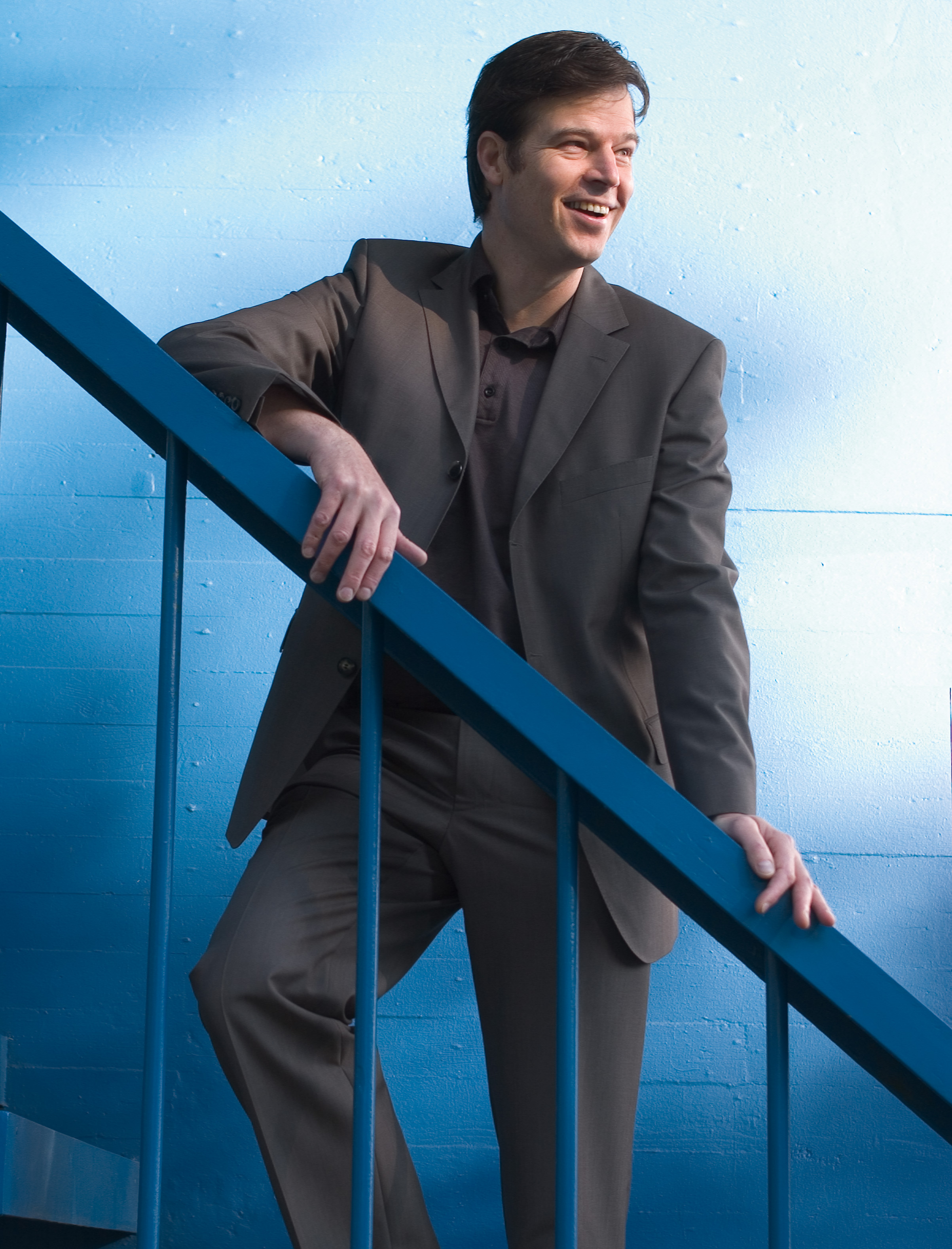
- Born: February 22, 1958 (age 68); The Hague
- Education: Delft University of Technology
- Scientific career
- Fields: computational mechanics
- Workplaces: University of Sheffield; University of Glasgow; Eindhoven University of Technology; Delft University of Technology

René de Borst FREng FRSE (born February 22, 1958) is a Dutch civil engineer who is known for his work on computational mechanics and fracture mechanics. Since January 2016 he is the Centenary Professor of Civil Engineering at the University of Sheffield.

== Early life and education ==
René de Borst obtained an MSc in Civil Engineering in 1982 at Delft University of Technology (with distinction). His MSc thesis contained the original version of PLAXIS (PLasticity AXIalSymmetry), a finite elenent code which is now widely used for computations in geotechnical engineering.

== Career ==
He started his career at TNO, where he laid foundations for, inter alia, plasticity, smeared crack models, and advanced solution techniques in DIANA FEA, a finite element package now widely used for analyses of concrtet structures. He obtained his doctorate in 1986 at Delft University of Technology (with distinction). In 1988 he was appointed Professor of Computational Mechanics at the Faculty of Civil Engineering of Delft University of Technology, and in 1999 as Professor of Engineering Mechanics at the Faculty of Aerospace Engineering at the same university. In 2000 he was appointed as Distinguished Professor. In 2007 he was appointed Dean of the Faculty of Mechanical Engineering and Distinguished Professor at Eindhoven University of Technology. From 2012 until 2015 he was the Regius Professor of Civil Engineering and Mechanics at the University of Glasgow. Since January 2016 he is the inaugural holder of The Centenary Chair of Civil Engineering at the University of Sheffield.

De Borst has worked on several topics in engineering mechanics and in materials engineering, such as the mechanical properties of concrete, soils, composites, and rubbers, in particular, the development of mathematical and numerical models. His most significant work is on fracture mechanics, computational mechanics, and frictional materials. His work is of importance in civil engineering, structural engineering, and aerospace engineering.

René de Borst is the author of two books, over 300 publications in archival journals and book chapters, and has supervised over 50 PhD students. Until 2024, he was the editor-in-chief of the International Journal for Numerical Methods in Engineering and the International Journal for Numerical and Analytical Methods in Geomechanics. He is associate editor of the Aeronautical Journal, and editor of a major reference work, the Encyclopedia of Computational Mechanics.

== Recognition ==
He received the Composite Structures Award in 1995, the Max-Planck-Forschungspreis in 1996 and in 1998 he was presented with the Computational Mechanics Award of the International Association of Computational Mechanics. In 1999 he received the Spinoza Prize from the Netherlands Organization for Scientific Research. In 2002 he was elected Fellow of the International Association of Computational Mechanics and in 2005 he was elected as Member of the Royal Netherlands Academy of Arts and Sciences. In 2010 he became Fellow of the International Association for Fracture Mechanics of Concrete and Concrete Structures. In 2011 he received the Royal Society Wolfson Research Merit Award, and was appointed Officer in the National Order of Merit (France) for his efforts to improve French-Dutch scientific relations. In 2012 he became Fellow of the Institution of Civil Engineers. Since 2013 he is Fellow of the Royal Society of Edinburgh and since 2014 he is a Member of the European Academy of Sciences and Arts. In 2015 he has been awarded the degree of Doctor Honoris Causa of the Institut national des sciences Appliquées de Lyon, he was awarded the Grand Prize of the Japanese Society for Computational Engineering Science (JSCES), was elected as Fellow of the Royal Academy of Engineering, and received an Advanced Grant of the European Research Council. He received the O.C. Zienkiewicz Medal of the Polish Association for Computational Mechanics in 2017 and became an honorary member of the Italian Group of Fracture in 2019. He was elected Fellow of the European Academy of Sciences in 2023.
