= Anil Kokaram =

Trinidadian engineer and entrepreneur

Anil C. Kokaram is a Trinidadian engineer and entrepreneur. He is famous for his Oscar-winning inventions enabling the restoration of audio and images and is currently the Chair of Electronic Engineering at Trinity College Dublin.

== Background ==
=== Family and childhood ===
Anil Kokaram was born in Sangre Grande, Trinidad in 1967. His father Richard Kokaram came from Fyzabad and was Principal of Hillview College in Tunapuna, Trinidad and Tobago from 1989 to 1999. His mother Lynette Kokaram was an educator and a former Principal of Tacarigua Presbyterian School and is currently vice principal at Specialist Learning Centre at St. Augustine in Trinidad. He has three other siblings: Vashiest, an attorney in Port-of-Spain, Nalini and Kavishti.

The family lived in Curepe, and Anil went to primary school at Curepe Presbyterian. In 1979 he joined Hillview College where he studied Science and Engineering until 1985. At the time he is said to have a "boundless natural curiosity" and a wide range of interests including astrophysics, chemistry, science fiction, nature and building model aircraft. The scientist Carl Sagan and the naturalist Sir David Attenborough are among his sources of inspiration. At the age of 13, he was already studying the prediction and control with measurements of the flight trajectory and landing of his models.

=== Education and early career ===
In 1985, after completing his A Levels in mathematics, physics and chemistry, he received an open national scholarship in the field of science. He then was a mathematics teacher at Hillview College for one year. In 1986, thanks to a Tate and Lyle scholarship he started studying electrical and information sciences at Cambridge University and he completed a Bachelor of Arts with 2.1 Honours (Upper Second Class) in 1989. He stayed at Cambridge University until 1993 to complete a Doctor of Philosophy degree (Ph.D.) in Digital Signal Processing on the thesis: Motion Picture Restoration. He then co-wrote 21 publications as a Research Fellow from 1993 to 1997 with other Cambridge University scientists on DSP techniques for still and moving images.

=== Private life ===
Anil Kokaram married Stefanie Mayer - born in Duttweiler, Germany - who worked at SAP Company, and they lived at Greenpark Road in Bray. On 30 April 2017 Stefanie Kokaram was found dead on Killiney beach. Gardai confirmed a "tragic incident" after a woman was sought for three days.

=== Hobbies ===
As an enthusiast of cricket and old films he based some of his research studies on video streaming for televised sport matches.

== Trinity College Dublin ==
=== Professor and Sigmedia Research Group ===
From 1998 to 2011 he worked in Trinity College Dublin as a professor and senior lecturer in the Electrical Engineering department. He established the Sigmedia research group which focuses on signal processing and media applications. The group currently works on many EU Projects in Digital cinema and restoration, Information Retrieval and Human Speech Communication and gathers 19 other scientists from Trinity College. The Adapt Center a world-leading SFI Research center in Dublin in association with Huawei presented many of their research programmes during an event in 2016 "Watch! Video Everywhere". In an interview Anil Kokaram gave in 2010 he claims that his group Sigmedia is "the first to use the 3D Dublin footage in making short clips of 3D Dublin. The process of stereo HD post production is quite challenging".

=== Research work ===
He is the author of over 200 papers published in various conferences and journals. His most popular articles reach 300 citations such as : "Automated colour grading using colour distribution transfer, Interpolation of missing data in image sequences"; "N-dimensional probability density function transfer and its application to color transfer"; "On missing data treatment for degraded video and film archives: a survey and a new Bayesian approach". He is also the author of a 334 pages book entitled "Motion Picture Restoration" that was published by Springer in 1998. The book addresses the topic of Digital Algorithms for Artefact Suppression in Degraded Motion Picture Film and Video. It is sometimes considered as a reference in this field.

=== Head of Department ===
Since 2016, he is head of the department of Electronic and Electrical Engineering at Trinity College Dublin. With this position, he aims to "re-energizing our curriculum development and helping to improve our input from industry" as well as continue his involvement in Sigmedia Group. He is also the lecturer of several modules including some for the Engineering course.

=== Public appearances ===
In 2010, he spoke at TEDxDUBLIN on the topic "The Mathematics of Bullet Time - From Muybridge to the Matrix". On 21 December 2017, Huawei invited him to their Research Video Summit in Dublin.

== Awards ==
=== Academy Awards ===
In 2007, Anil Kokaram received a Scientific and Technical Academy Award (Oscars) at their 79th annual ceremony for his cutting-edge video and audio restoration technologies: The Furnace. This toolset was developed in association with software engineers Dr. Bill Collis, Simon Robinson, Ben Kent from The Foundry and consists of an integrated suite of software tools that provides temporal coherence for enhancing visual effects in motion picture sequences with high quality robustness, modularity and flexibility. Before this technology, such tasks were very difficult and only possible with manual editing. The Furnace technology enabled some archive films to be restored such as John F Kennedy's visit to Ireland in 1963. In 2018, Peter Jackson used a lot of these video and audio restoration technologies in his documentary film They Shall Not Grow Old which transformed 100-year-old footage of the First World War into rich colour and sharp relief.

=== Other awards ===
In 2001, Anil Kokaram was made Fellow of Trinity College Dublin, which rewards a Scholarship or research achievement. In 2007 he received an Honorary Fellowship from Engineers Ireland. In 2012, he was selected as one of America's 50 most influential Irish executives in Hollywood (also known as ITLG Hollywood 50) by the Irish Technology Leadership Group. He received the title of National Icon awarded by The Government of Trinidad and Tobago in 2013.

== Green Parrot Pictures, Google and Youtube ==
=== Beginning in the Film Industry ===
In 1995, Anil Kokaram worked on the post-production of the film The Matrix in the field of DSP for special effects. Following this project he worked on other films such as Casino Royale, X-Men 3: The Last Stand, The Da Vinci Code, Charlie and the Chocolate Factory, Batman Begins, King Kong, the Lord of the Rings trilogy, Poseidon and Superman Returns.

=== Green Parrot Pictures Start-Up ===
In 2004 he created his own start-up producing video enhancement, restoration and conditioning software named Green Parrot Pictures. With Green Parrot Pictures Pr. Kokaram was the first to create a library of motion-based algorithms for a wide range of post-production tasks including Dirt and Sparkle, Noise and missing frames using motion estimation technology that combined both spatial and temporal information. The enhancement technology consists of picture detail increase, addition of effects not originally present, modification of the movement of a scene and amplification or altering of the colour content. Using statistical signal processing the start-up company provided a tool able to make self diagnostic of the good quality output. It is also able to adapt the quality of a picture depending on performance characteristics of personal, home or broadcast devices.

Green Parrot Pictures also developed applications for the early iPhone (such as Color Claw) and plug-ins for Adobe Afx, Premiere and Final Cut. Their first product "FilmFix" was marketed with Red Giant Software. In 2009 the company also worked with Movidius on their first video processing research.

=== Collaboration with Google ===
In 2011, Google bought Green Parrot Pictures in order to improve the look of videos posted on its website by using bandwidth more efficiently. This included Google-owned company YouTube which planned to perform background processing on user videos while being uploaded to the site with sharpness improvement, visual noise and camera shake reduction. The sum paid by Google has not been disclosed. This acquisition disturbed the users from other software editors which were in partnership with Green Parrot before, but were not able to keep using the technologies following Google's acquisition. Red Giant is one of them with their Denoiser product.

From 2011 to 2017, Anil Kokaram became Technology Lead in the Transcoding Group as well as the Chrome Media Algorithms Group of Google and YouTube at their office in Mountain View, California. He was in charge of developing new video tools for Chrome and YouTube and led a project of Video Demand-Side platform to improve and measure the video quality in the YouTube video processing pipeline.

=== Film producer ===
He was executive producer for the film Fubar/Killer Weekend that stars Mark Heap and Danny Kirrane and was released on 25 August 2018.
