= Margaret O'Mahony =

Irish civil engineer

Margaret O'Mahony is an Irish civil engineer. She is the Professor of Civil Engineering at Trinity College Dublin.

O'Mahony completed a bachelor of engineering in civil engineering at NUI Galway and a doctorate from the Department of Engineering Science, University of Oxford.

She is chair of the civil engineering at Trinity College Dublin, the first female to hold the position that was established in 1842.

O'Mahony is a fellow of Trinity College Dublin, the Irish Academy of Engineering, and the Institute of Demolition Engineers.
