= Teen Turn =

Irish education-promotion charity

- Industry: Technology
- Founded: 2016
- Founders: Joanne Dolan and Niambh Scullion
- Headquarters: Ireland
- Revenue: 63,229 (2019)
- Total assets: 54,926 (2024)
- Number of employees: 6 (2024, 2023)
- Website: teen-turn.com

Teen Turn is an Irish charity which encourages teenage girls to pursue careers in technology.

== History ==
Teen Turn is an Irish charity which was founded in 2016 by Joanne Dolan and Niambh Scullion with the aim of promoting technology and computer skills to girls in disadvantaged areas. It was first trialed in the summer of 2016 with 20 girls from five schools, and since has expanded to 18 schools and 30 tech companies.

== Activities ==
In particular the group aim to work with girls from communities with low uptake of university or third level education. They partner with technology and digital companies to provide work placements and mentoring. They provide two week work placements. The charity also run after school programs. Participants from this program in Limerick went on to win the BT Young Pioneer Award in 2018. In 2018, Teen Turn partnered with The Digital Hub and Gaisce to take part in the Technovation Challenge.

=== Awards ===
- 2017 EU Digital Impact Organisation of the Year.
