= Mary Mulvihill =

Irish scientist, radio television presenter, author and educator

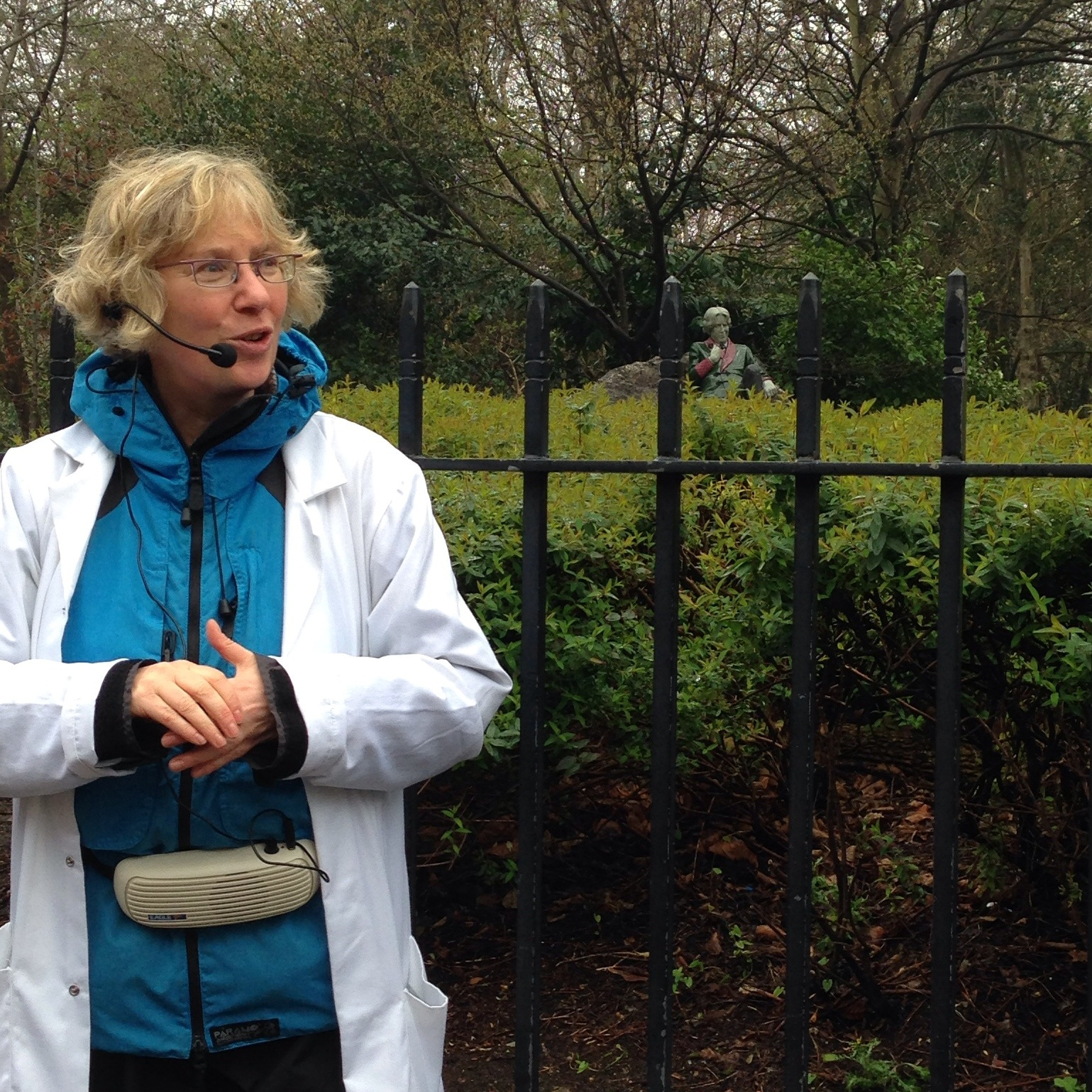
- Mulvihill presents a guided tour in front of the Oscar Wilde statue, Merrion Square, Dublin, in March 2014
- Born: 1 September 1959; London, England
- Died: 11 June 2015 (aged 55); Dublin, Ireland
- Education: Trinity College Dublin; Dublin City University
- Employer(s): Self-employed consultant Raidió Teilifís Éireann (RTÉ)

Mary Mulvihill (1 September 1959 – 11 June 2015) was an Irish scientist, radio television presenter, author and educator. She founded and served as the first chairperson of Women in Technology and Science (WITS), and is viewed as a pioneer of science communication in Ireland. She was featured in Silicon Republic's 100 Top Women in STEM list.

== Early life ==
Mulvihill studied at Trinity College Dublin, where she was elected a Scholar in Natural Science in 1979, and graduated in 1981 with a degree in genetics. She then went on to complete a master's degree in statistics in 1982 at Trinity.

Until 1987, she worked as a Research Officer for An Foras Taluntais (now Teagasc). She later attended Dublin City University to study journalism, earning a diploma in 1988.

== Career ==
Mulvihill worked primarily as a self-employed freelancer, as a writer, broadcaster, and developing the online resource of Ingenious Ireland with its accompanying walking tours. She served on the Irish Council for Bioethics, and as a council member of Industrial Heritage Association of Ireland.

=== Broadcasting ===
Mulvihill was the creator and host of a number of popular science series for RTÉ Radio 1 and Lyric FM. Two of the radio series she developed centred on the collections of the National Botanic Gardens, Washed, Pressed and Dried (2007), and of the Natural History Museum, Chopped, Pickled, and Stuffed (2006).

Her work in broadcasting led her to develop a series of walking tours of Dublin, which took in the scientific history. These tours were also available as podcasts. One of the trails she developed was Dublin by Numbers, in conjunction with Institution of Engineers of Ireland, which focused on the places in Dublin relating to mathematics. The accompanying website maps places of historic interest linked to STEM in Ireland, as well as sites of ecological and archaeological interest. A similar set of audio tours were developed by Mulvihill, in collaboration with Matthew Jebb for the National Botanic Gardens.

=== Women in Technology and Science ===
Mulvihill was an advocate for science, technology, engineering, and mathematics (STEM), in particular the history and biographies of women involved in STEM. She founded the group Women in Technology and Science (WITS) in 1990, and served as the organisation's first chairperson. WITS is an advocacy and networking group for women in STEM fields in Ireland. One is the resources WITS provides is a register of Irish women in STEM interested in serving on boards and professional or conference panels.

In 2014, she launched the exhibition SeaScience and Exploration Zone at the Galway City Museum.

=== Writing ===
Mulvihill served as the co-editor of Enterprise Ireland’s bi-monthly magazine Technology Ireland. She was also a regular contributor to The Irish Times. She wrote a number of books, and edited two volumes of historical biographies of women in STEM for WITS. For her book, Ingenious Ireland: A County-by-County Exploration of Irish Mysteries and Marvels., she received the Irish National Science and Technology Journalist of the Year 2002-3, which the judges described as "a meticulously researched and hugely impressive book." With this book she also won the IBM Science Journalist of the Year award.

- Mulvihill, M. (ed) (1997). Stars, Shells, & Bluebells: Women Scientists and Pioneers. Dublin: Women in Technology and Science (WITS).
- Mulvihill. M. (2002). Ingenious Ireland: A County-by-County Exploration of Irish Mysteries and Marvels. Dublin: Town House.
- Mulvihill, M. (ed) (2009). Lab Coats and Lace. Dublin: Women in Technology and Science (WITS).
- Mulvihill, M. (2009). Drive Like a Woman, Shop Like a Man. Dublin: New Island Books.
- Mulvihill, M. (2012). Ingenious Dublin. e-book: Ingenious Ireland.

Mulvihill was also a blogger, and was involved in Silicon Republic's Women Invent initiative and curated their list of Ireland's Greatest Women Inventors, in which younger people were encouraged to vote for their favourite. For 15 years Mulvihill published a science communications email newsletter (1995–2010) which in 2008 she titled Science@Culture Bulletin. The Mary Mulvihill Association plans to introduce a Science@Culture talk series in June 2022.

== Personal life ==
Mulvihill was married to Scottish theoretical physicist Brian Dolan of Maynooth University. She died on 11 June 2015, aged 55. WITS celebrated its 25th anniversary on 3 November 2015 with a lecture in her memory and a lecture at the 2015 Robert Boyle Summer School in Lismore, County Waterford, was also dedicated to her.

== Legacy ==
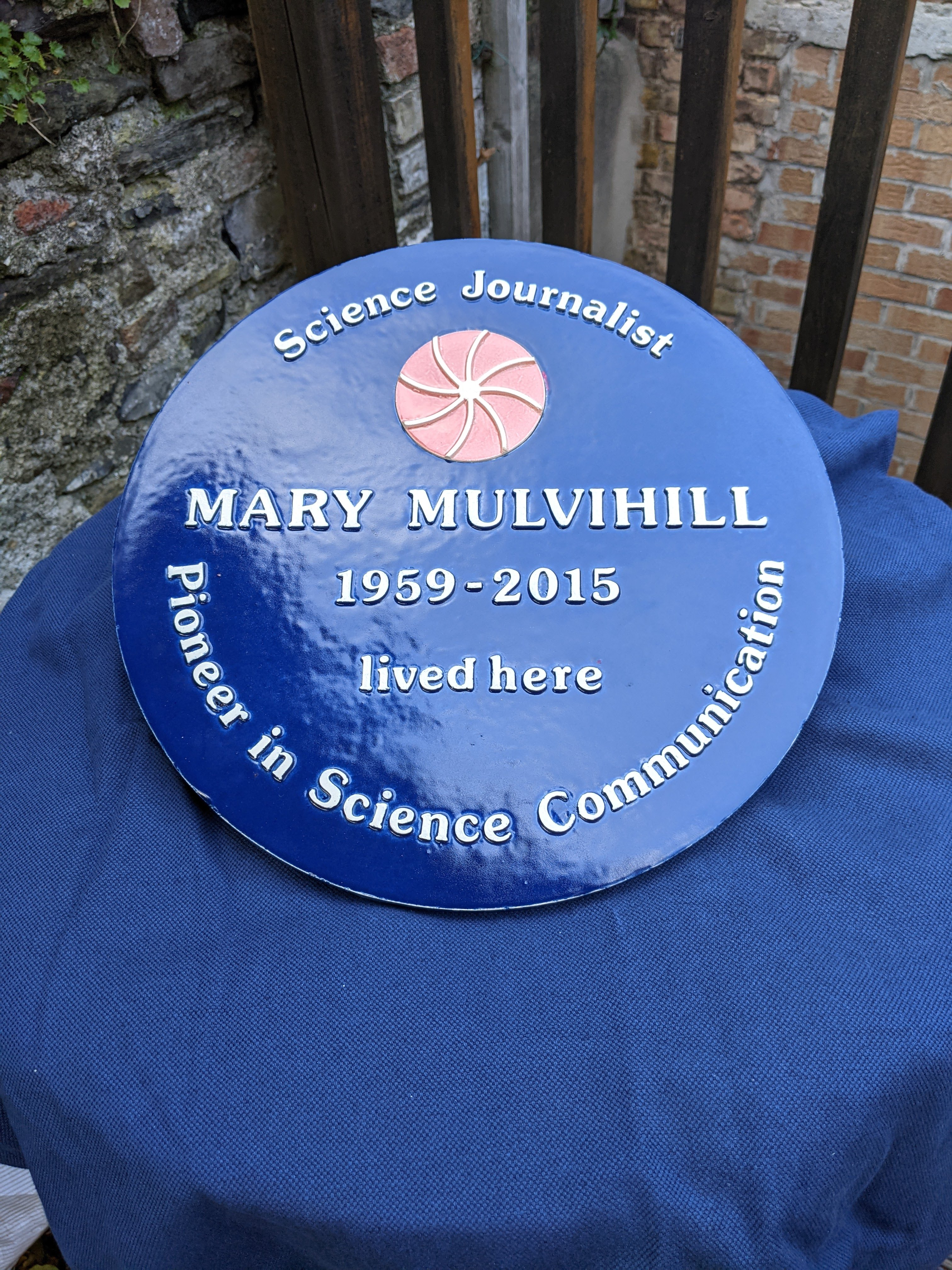
Plaque to Mulvihill, unveiled on 6 November 2021

In 2016 the family and friends of Mary Mulvihill established the Mary Mulvihill Memorial Award to commemorate her work in science journalism and science communication. The award will go to a student at an Irish higher education institution who best represents the "curiosity, creativity and storytelling imagination".

In June 2020 Dublin City University announced a posthumous DCU Alumni Award for Mulvihill for Outstanding Achievement in the area of Societal Impact.
