= Rocco Lupoi =

Rocco Lupoi is an Italian lecturer, assistant professor and researcher in mechanical and manufacturing engineering at Trinity College Dublin, Ireland. He is an expert on cold spray additive manufacturing, selective laser melting, and similar deposition methods.

== Background ==
In July 2004, Lupoi completed a master's degree in mechanical engineering at Polytechnic University of Turin, Italy. Then, he was awarded a PhD from the University of Bath, UK in 2008, with thesis title "Effect of shape, size and material on energy dissipation in Equal Channel Angular Extrusion". From a grant he received for his PhD, Lupoi was able to develop a new technology that dissipates energy in engineering systems against earthquakes, collisions and other unwanted events.

From October 2008 to July 2012, Lupoi joined the Institute of Manufacturing at the University of Cambridge as a research associate focusing on melting-free material additive processes. He is currently Assistant Professor within the Mechanical and Manufacturing Engineering Department of Trinity College Dublin.

== Research career ==
In 2011, he was awarded of a Marie Curie Fellowship from the EU, which supports research training and career development.

In 2015, he led a research program on 3D printing of metal components and reducing its cost, which received funding from the European Space Agency (ESA). With other professors he has been able to improve efficiency of cold spray 3D printing technology by increasing the speed to 2,472 km per hour and using helium gas as a carrier of the metallic particles.

In February 2019, he was one of eleven Trinity College researchers to be awarded of the SFI Technology Innovation Development Award (TIDA). He is also a Funded Investigator of AMBER and I-Form in the development of free-form printing of orthopedic implants with selective laser melting, which also involves research on biomedical compatibility of the three-dimensional manufactured parts.

He is also one of the inventors of a patented technology "SprayLaze" consisting of a Laser-based coating. Lupoi is actively involved in projects with the Irish Research Council on spacecraft coating systems and Enterprise Ireland on additive and cold spray techniques for valve components.

== Notable publications ==
- Yin S, Cavaliere P, Aldwell B, Jenkins R, Liao H, Li W, Lupoi R. Cold spray additive manufacturing and repair: Fundamentals and applications. Additive Manufacturing. 2018 May 1;21:628-50
- Li W, Yang K, Yin S, Yang X, Xu Y, Lupoi R. Solid-state additive manufacturing and repairing by cold spraying: A review. Journal of Materials Science & Technology. 2018 Mar 1;34(3):440-57
- Yin S, Xie Y, Cizek J, Ekoi EJ, Hussain T, Dowling DP, Lupoi R. Advanced diamond-reinforced metal matrix composites via cold spray: properties and deposition mechanism. Composites Part B: Engineering. 2017 Mar 15;113:44-54
