= Irish Council for Bioethics =

- Founded: 2002; 24 years ago
- Dissolved: 27 May 2011; 15 years ago
- Purpose: Exploring ethical issues in science and medicine
- Location: Dublin, Ireland
- Website: Irish Council for Bioethics

The Irish Council for Bioethics (Irish: Comhairle Bitheitice na hÉireann) was an independent body established by the Government of Ireland in 2002 to examine and respond to bioethical issues in science and medicine. It provided independent advice to the government and those making policy, as well as promoting public understanding of contemporary bioethical issues. It ceased operations in 2010, due to withdrawal of state funding in the wake of the post-2008 Irish economic downturn.

During its years of operation, the members of the council were nominated by the Royal Irish Academy, which also provided the body's secretariat. It was funded by grants through Forfás.
