= Chris Horn (computer scientist) =

Academic and businessperson, founder of IONA Technologies

Dr Chris Horn
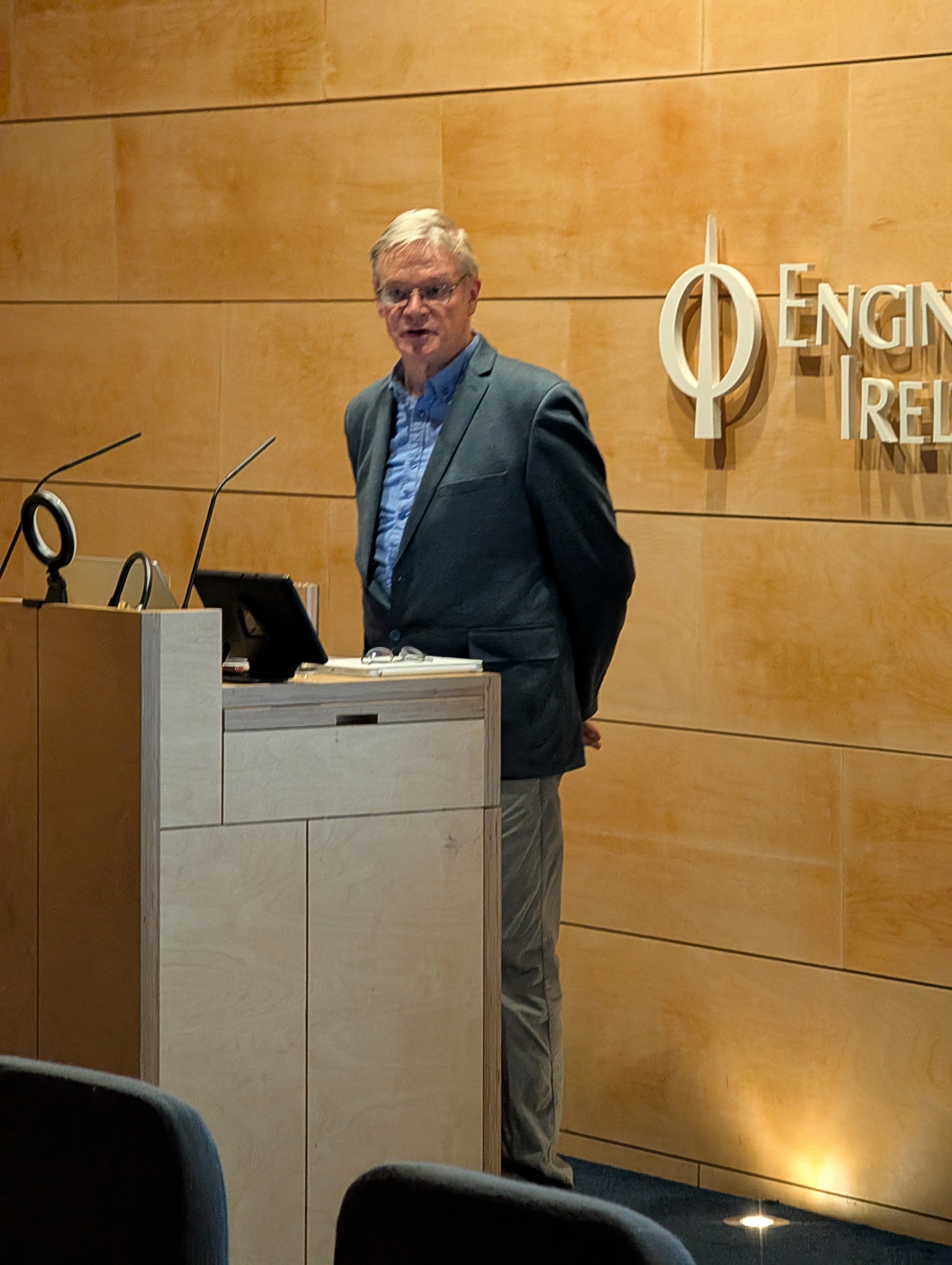
- Chris Horn at Engineers Ireland
- Known for: Founder of IONA Technologies
- Spouse: Karlin Lillington

Academic background
- Education: Trinity College Dublin
- Thesis: Dada - the language and its implementation (1984)
- Doctoral advisor: Michael Purser

Academic work
- Discipline: Computer Science
- Institutions: Trinity College Dublin

Christopher J. Horn is an Irish academic and businessperson, co-founder and CEO of Ireland's first NASDAQ-listed company, IONA Technologies, once one of the world's top ten software-only companies by revenue. He also led fundraising for, and became founding chairperson of, Dublin's Science Gallery, and later its international spinoff projects. Horn, an electronics engineer and holder of a PhD in computer science, has also written extensively on technology and business innovation, and on privacy, including for The Irish Times. A former president of Engineers Ireland, and later made a Fellow of that body, he was awarded an honorary doctorate by Trinity College Dublin, and a Gold Medal of the Royal Dublin Society. He has been chairperson or member of multiple commercial and voluntary boards, including those of Trinity College Dublin and Science Foundation Ireland.

== Early life and education ==
Christopher J. Horn was born in the UK and his family moved to Bray, County Wicklow when he was very young. He grew up in Blackrock, Dublin, attending the local Newpark Comprehensive School. His first job was as an attendant at the Butlin's Mosney holiday camp north of Dublin.

He took his first degrees in Trinity College Dublin (TCD), becoming a scholar in 1976 and graduating with BA and BAI (Engineering) in 1978, with a specialism in electronic engineering. He continued study at Trinity, completing a PhD in Computing and Control Science and Technology in 1983, the thesis for which, entitled Dada - the language and its implementation, was published in 1984.

== Career ==
=== Academic career ===
Horn was hired as a junior lecturer at TCD in 1979, working on a new BA moderatorship in Computer Science. After completion of his PhD, he worked for a year as a consultant for Chaco, which later became part of Baltimore Technologies, as a contracted civil servant ("functionary") at the European Commission principal offices in Brussels, dealing with the ESPRIT programme. He then continued as a lecturer in the Department of Computer Science at TCD, where he worked full-time until 1991.

=== IONA ===
In 1981 Horn had visited Stanford University, where he met Andy Bechtolsheim, inventor of the Stanford University Network (SUN) workstation, and Bill Joy, and when they later went on to co-found Sun Microsystems, he began to talk to fellow academics about starting their own venture. Eventually, in 1991, Horn, Sean Baker and Annrai O’Toole, all then academics in the Department of Computer Science at TCD, put in £1,000 each to found IONA Technologies. The company aimed to produce object-oriented software, specifically seeing a market demand for middleware. IONA received limited support from Trinity College, including an office in a TCD innovation centre on Westland Row. Horn took up the role of CEO, and was also the lead architect for at least one major product. The agreement with Trinity College did allow for Horn and one of his colleagues to work part-time for 2–3 years after launching IONA. The firm's main object-oriented middleware software product, Orbix, was successful. The company, which did not raise angel or venture capital, but did have some IDA Ireland support, grew, and, after securing a 25% investment from Sun Microsystems in 1993, was able to float on the NASDAQ, achieving the fifth largest debut on that exchange to date. At peak the company reached a market valuation of US$1.75 billion. Horn sold a substantial tranche of shares in 1998.

Horn stepped down from the CEO role in 2000, but remained as a non-executive director; he returned to the CEO role from 2003 to 2005, after the "dotcom crash". Having cashed in shares previously, Horn, who was vice-chairperson from 2005 onwards, received a further payout of around €7 million when the company was finally sold in 2008. He remained a shareholder, selling more shares in 2011, but still holding 10% of IONA, worth €130 million, after that; IONA was dissolved in 2017.

=== After IONA ===
Horn invested in a search and advertising technology provider, Sophia (sold to Boxfish), Nomos Software and a data storage enterprise, Gridstore (later Hypergrid), among others. He also worked with private equity outfit Atlantic Bridge, eventually joining as a partner and advisor. He served as a non-executive director on the boards two billing software companies, Sepro Telecom and LeCayla, and on a cloud-based dev-ops outfit, Cloudsmith, which he earlier co-founded.

He writes regularly for The Irish Times.

== Voluntary and public service roles ==
Horn was elected as president of Engineers Ireland in 2008, and devised a detailed plan for his one-year term, reporting on progress against this during the year, attending or hosting 88 events. He was also a member of the board of Irish State agency Science Foundation Ireland.

=== Trinity College and Science Gallery ===
Horn has been a member of the Board of Trinity College Dublin (TCD), and of the board of TCD's Trinity Foundation. He was also chairperson of TCD-based telecoms research organisation CTVR for six years.

Horn led the fundraising committee for the proposed Science Gallery, hosted by Trinity College. He later chaired its first governing board from the gallery's launch in 2008. Subsequently he led the board of Science Gallery International - which promoted similar facilities, attached to third-level institutions, in a range of countries - until 2019. He commented about his shock and great disappointment at an abrupt announcement by Trinity College in late October 2021 that Science Gallery Dublin would close in early 2022, and called on Provist Linda Doyle, a former director of CTVR, to act to prevent the loss.

=== Other roles ===
Horn chaired the Irish Management Institute (IMI), and was the founding chairperson of the Ireland China Business Association. He was chairperson of UNICEF Ireland for several years, working with CEO Melanie Verwoerd. He has also spoken, with Karlin Lillington, for the Front Line Defenders human rights charity, returning to the topic of technology-based risks to human rights defenders in 2021.

In January 2013 Horn took on the chairmanship of Northern Ireland Science Park Connect, a program which aimed to support early-stage and "wantrepreneur" businesses, a role he held until 2016. He has been a judge for the Irish Times Innovation Awards since 2013, a role he still held as of 2021.

He is a director of Ambisense, an environmental analytics company, among several ventures, and is and has been a member of multiple other boards and award committees.

== Recognition ==
Horn received an honorary doctorate from Trinity College Dublin in 2001, and was elected as a Fellow of Engineers Ireland, as well as being awarded the Gold Medal for Industry of the Royal Dublin Society. Horn was also awarded an Innovation Award from TCD in 2006, and a Whitaker Award from the Irish Academy of Management in 2019.

== Publication ==
Aside from his columns for The Irish Times, and blog, Horn edited a book, Professor John Byrne: Reminiscences: Father of Computing in Ireland about John Gabriel Byrne, a pioneering TCD professor and researcher in computer science.

== Personal life ==
Horn was married to Susie Horn, with whom he has four adult children, two boys and two girls. He has lived in Shankill, a coastal southern suburb of Dublin, for many years. He was noted for his modest lifestyle, still living in a 3-bedroom semi-detached suburban house when his wealth exceeded £270 million, his only indulgence being a mid-range new car. In 1998, he bought an historic Georgian house, Askefield, the former rectory of the Church of Ireland in southern Shankill, then the home of journalist and politician Shane Ross, on 6 acres, for over £2 million, and he and his wife moved their four young children there in 1999. He is a member of the Church of Ireland and the Horns hosted an Alpha course book club.

Jointly with technology journalist Karlin Lillington, he has been a senior sponsor of the Irish National Opera since its launch year. As of 2021, he was married to Lillington.
