= Margaret Lucas (engineer) =

Scottish mechanical engineer

Margaret Lucas is a Scottish mechanical engineer specializing in vibration analysis and the applications of high-power ultrasound, including shattering and sampling rock in space exploration, under-sea oil and gas exploration, and ultrasonic cutting devices in robot-assisted surgery. She is Professor of Ultrasonics and Head of Systems, Power & Energy Division in the James Watt School of Engineering at the University of Glasgow.

== Education and career ==
Lucas was an undergraduate student at the University of Aberdeen, and earned a PhD in mechanical engineering at Loughborough University. She remained at Loughborough as a lecturer, beginning in 1990, and moved to the University of Glasgow in 1996. She became a professor there in 2006.

== Recognition ==
Lucas was elected as a Fellow of the Royal Society of Edinburgh in 2020. Also in 2020, the Institution of Engineering and Technology gave Lucas the IET Achievement Medal for Ultrasonic Technology. In 2021, she was elected a Fellow of the Royal Academy of Engineering.
