= Patrick Prendergast (academic) =

21st-century Irish academic leader

Patrick Prendergast MRIA
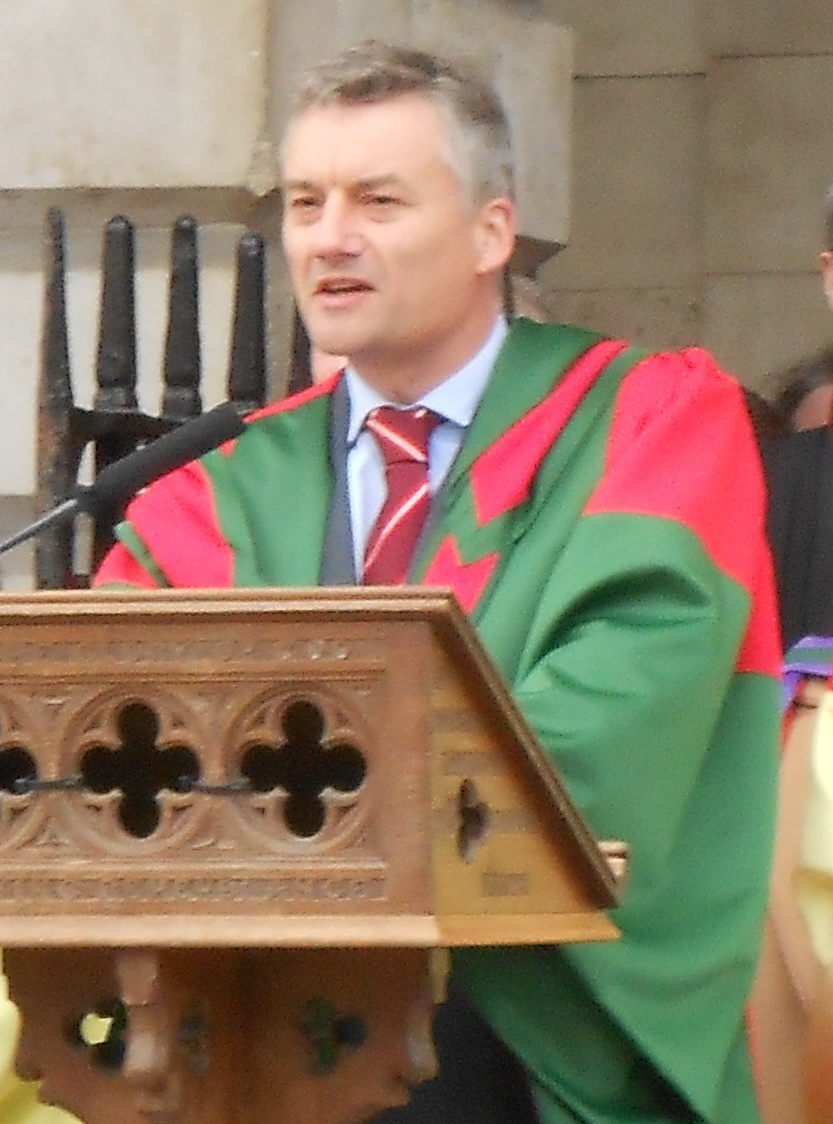
- Prendergast announcing the new fellows and scholars of Trinity College Dublin in 2013

44th Provost of Trinity College Dublin
- In office 1 August 2011 – 30 July 2021
- Preceded by: John Hegarty
- Succeeded by: Linda Doyle

Personal details
- Born: Patrick John Prendergast Enniscorthy, County Wexford, Ireland
- Education: Trinity College Dublin

Patrick John Prendergast is an Irish engineer, specialised in bioengineering, who served as the 44th Provost of Trinity College Dublin from 2011 to 2021 and the Chancellor and Chairperson of the Governing Body of South East Technological University since 2022. He has published more than 200 papers and volumes, and been cited widely.

== Early life and education ==
Born in Enniscorthy, County Wexford, Ireland, Prendergast grew up in the nearby village of Oulart, and received his secondary education at St Peter's College, Wexford. He then studied at Trinity College Dublin as an undergraduate, completing a degree in Mechanical Engineering in 1987 and a PhD in 1991 for a thesis titled Structural Analysis of the Artificial Hip Joint with a Damage Model to Simulate Bone Adaptation. He wrote an account of his undergraduate years in Trinity College Dublin in the Eighties.

== Academic career ==
After post-doctoral positions in Bologna, Italy, and Nijmegen, Netherlands, he became a lecturer at Trinity in 1995 and was elected a Fellow of the College in 1998. With colleagues from medicine and dentistry, he established the Trinity Centre for Bioengineering in 2002, and was appointed to a Personal Chair in Bio-Engineering in 2007. He is credited with adding biomechanics as a topic area to Trinity's engineering syllabus, and developing a Master's in Bioengineering.

Prendergast has published more than 200 journal papers and edited many books and special issues of journals on topics in biomechanical engineering such as mechanobiology and design of medical devices, including orthopaedic and cardiovascular implants. His work has won funding from Science Foundation Ireland, often as Principal Investigator, as well as from the EU and some industry sources. He was a member of the Glion Colloquium of University Presidents where he published papers on strategy and leadership.

He served as Dean of Graduate Studies at the university from 2004 to 2007 and was appointed Vice-Provost / Chief Academic Officer in 2008. Prendergast held sabbatical positions in the Department of Orthopaedics of Erasmus University Rotterdam and the Institute of Bioengineering of the UPC, Barcelona.

=== Provostship ===
In 2011, he was elected as the 44th Provost of Trinity College, for a ten-year term. For external purposes, the post is elaborated to Provost and President. During his term, Prendergast has focused on the university's rankings from QS, the Times HES and Shanghai, and on increasing sources of funding.

In 2016 a "Provost's Council" was formed to advise how Trinity College Dublin might finance new projects and initiatives. Prendergast also negotiated Trinity's entry into the prestigious League of European Research Universities (LERU), the first and only university on the island of Ireland to become a member.

In May 2018, Prendergast unveiled plans for a new institute in Engineering, Environment and Emerging Technologies (E3), funded by an Irish philanthropic donation and Government funding, and the 'Martin Naughton E3 Learning Foundry' is now about to open in the university. The renovation of the magnificent Old Library of Trinity College, with a €25m contribution announced by government Minister Darragh O’Brien of Fianna Fáil, is also going ahead. A more controversial project to develop a new Trinity East campus with the Grand Canal Innovation District broke ground after the end of Prendergast's term in 2023 under the name "Portal."

In April 2019, Prendergast gave a wide-ranging interview to the music magazine Hot Press. He was involved in several controversies, most notably over branding and "Take Back Trinity", a student movement to resist commercialisation within the university. During his tenure he wrote a many articles for the Irish Times on Higher Education espousing views on how Irish higher education should develop, one of which proposed a Cabinet Minister and associated Department for Higher Education. This idea, considered far-fetched at the time, was implemented by the new Taoiseach Micheál Martin, his main change in the new government formation. Prendergast gave his last speech as Provost to Northern Ireland alumni advocating special measures for NI students not to pay the non-EU fee post-Brexit. The students’ final assessment of Prendergast was probably a good summary: “His trademark lack of regard for the on-the-ground effects of his decisions had a certain nobility to it. One may disagree with them, but at least there was no pretence of consensus building”.

== Board memberships ==
Prendergast has several chairperson roles that bring him to public attention. In February 2022 he was appointed by Minister for Further and Higher Education, Research, Innovation and Science, Simon Harris as the Chairperson of the South East Technological University, a new university in Ireland. In this capacity he made some comments to the national media about student accommodation which has critical comment by architects.

He was a member of the Board of the European Institute of Innovation and Technology (headquarters in Budapest) for eight years.

He is currently Chairperson of the Board of the Douglas Hyde Gallery of Contemporary Art, and of Literature Ireland, the national agency for promoting Irish literature abroad. Formerly he chaired the Board of Science Gallery International.

== Recognition ==
In 2009, Prendergast was awarded an ScD for published works in Bioengineering. He is a member of the Royal Irish Academy since 2008 in the Sciences division and an International Fellow of the Royal Academy of Engineering since 2013. He gave the Wartenweiler Lecture of the International Society of Biomechanics in 2009, and the Richard Skalak Lecture of the Biomedical Engineering Department of Columbia University in 2014. For his scientific contributions he was made an Honorary Fellow of the Anatomical Society in 2016, and an Honorary Member of the European Society of Biomechanics in 2018.

Following a philanthropic donation by Stanley Quek, the Patrick Prendergast Chair of Immuno-Oncology (2023) was established at the Trinity St James Cancer Institute, with the first incumbent being Patrick Forde.

Academic offices
Preceded by John Hegarty	Provost of Trinity College Dublin; 2011–2021	Succeeded by Linda Doyle
