= Usher (surname) =

Usher is a surname. Notable people with the surname include:

- Andrew Usher, Edinburgh distiller
- Bazoline Estelle Usher (1885–1992), American educator
- Bob Usher (1925–2014), Baseball player
- Brian Usher (1944–2025), English footballer
- Charles Usher (1865–1942), Scottish ophthalmologist
- David Usher, Canadian recording artist
- Elaine Usher (1932–2014), was an English actress who was known for her work on British television
- Ellis Baker Usher (1852–1931), Wisconsin politician
- Ellis Baker Usher (Maine politician) (1785–1855)
- Graham Usher (dancer) (1938–1975) ballet dancer with the Royal Ballet
- Graham Usher (journalist) (1958–2013), foreign correspondent who covered Palestine, Pakistan, and the United Nations
- Graham Usher (bishop), Bishop of Dudley
- Guy Usher (1883–1944), American actor
- Hezekiah Usher, first bookseller in the thirteen colonies
- Howard Usher (died 1802), English actor
- James Usher (or Ussher) (1581–1656), Archbishop of Armagh, 1625–1656
- James Ward Usher, benefactor of the Usher Gallery, in Lincoln, United Kingdom
- Jessie T. Usher, American actor
- John Palmer Usher, U.S. administrator, cabinet member of Abraham Lincoln
- Jordan Usher, American basketball player
- Karyn Usher, American television producer and screenwriter
- Leila Usher (1859–1955), American artist
- Michael Usher, Australian journalist and newsreader for Nine News
- Paul Usher (born 1961), English actor
- Richard Usher (1785–1843), English clown
- Robert Howell Craster Usher (1896–1924), English RAF officer and rugby player

== See also ==
- Ussher (surname)
