= Ussher (surname) =

Ussher is a surname. Notable people with the surname include:

- Arland Ussher (1899–1980), English and Irish academic, essayist and translator
- Ambrose Ussher (c. 1582–1629), Church of Ireland rector and biblical scholar, brother of James Ussher
- Beverley Ussher (1868–1908), Australian residential architect
- Elizabeth Tyrrell (née Ussher) (1619–1693), daughter of James Ussher
- Henry Ussher (d. 1613), Irish archbishop, nephew of John Ussher, uncle of James Ussher
- Henry Ussher (astronomer) (1741–1790), Irish astronomer
- Herbert Taylor Ussher (1836–1880), Governor of Tobago 1872-1875
- James Ussher (1581–1656), Irish archbishop and biblical scholar, nephew of Henry Ussher, cousin of Robert Ussher
- Jane Ussher (born 1953), New Zealand photographer
- John (Seón) Ussher (died 1600), Irish customs officer, publisher of the first printed Irish book
- John Ussher (died 1741), Irish MP
- John Ussher (1703–1749), Irish MP, his nephew
- Johnny Ussher (1830–1879), Canadian frontiersman
- Kitty Ussher (born 1971), British Labour Member of Parliament
- Richard J. Ussher (1841–1913), Irish ornithologist
- Robert Ussher (1592–1642), Irish bishop and Irish language promoter, son of Henry Ussher, cousin of James Ussher
- St George Ussher (d. 1775), later St George St George, 1st Baron Saint George
- Thomas Ussher (1779–1848), Anglo-Irish navy officer
- William Augustus Edmond Ussher (1849–1920), British geologist

== See also ==
- Usher (surname)
