= Ellis Baker Usher =

American writer and politician (1852–1931)

Ellis B. Usher

Chair of the Democratic Party of Wisconsin
- In office March 29, 1887 – January 16, 1890
- Preceded by: William A. Walker
- Succeeded by: Edward C. Wall

Personal details
- Born: Tucker Ellis Baker Usher; June 21, 1852 Buxton, Maine, U.S.
- Died: April 21, 1931 (aged 78) La Crosse, Wisconsin, U.S.
- Resting place: Oak Grove Cemetery, La Crosse
- Party: Democratic
- Spouse: Anna Meyers Bliss (m. 1888–1931)
- Relations: Leila Usher (sister); Ellis Baker Usher (grandfather)
- Children: Dorothy Bliss (Wilson); (b. 1892; died 1987)
- Education: Lombard College

Tucker Ellis Baker Usher (June 21, 1852 – April 21, 1931) was an American journalist, newspaper publisher, and politician from La Crosse, Wisconsin. He served as chairman of the Democratic Party of Wisconsin from 1887 to 1890, and was publisher of the La Crosse Chronicle for 20 years. Later in life, he published an eight-volume history of the state of Wisconsin, called Wisconsin, its Story and Biography, 1848–1913.

== Biography ==
Ellis Baker Usher was born on June 21, 1852, in Buxton, Maine. As a child, his family moved to La Crosse, Wisconsin, where his father had been hired to work as an agent of Cadwallader C. Washburn in charge of lumber operations on the Black River. Ellis Usher attended local schools in La Crosse, then attended Lombard College in Galesburg, Illinois, for one year.

At age 16, he was hired as a clerical aide to Judge S. S. Burton, who was receiver of the U.S. Land Office and deputy collector of internal revenue. After two years, he became a clerical aide in the real estate business of N. D. Taylor, and shortly became his partner in the business and also assisted in the publishing of a monthly real estate paper.

In 1873, he went to work as a reporter for the La Crosse Republican and Leader, and two years later purchased half ownership of the La Crosse Daily Liberal Democrat newspaper, which he later renamed the La Crosse Morning Chronicle. He was the choice of the Democratic caucus for chief clerk of the Wisconsin State Senate in 1877, but was not elected. In 1879, he acquired full ownership of the paper.

In 1887, Usher was elected chairman of the Democratic Party of Wisconsin, and served for three years. He resigned in 1890 after the death of his father forced him to allocate more time to his private business affairs. He was known for strident speeches and editorials opposing William Jennings Bryan and his platform.

Usher sold the Chronicle in 1901 and moved to Washington, D.C., to work as a special correspondent for Milwaukee newspapers. At the time of his death, he was described as an intimate friend of Theodore Roosevelt. In his later years, he returned to Wisconsin and resided in Milwaukee and ran an advertising business there.

In addition to his journalism, Usher studied history and was a member of the Wisconsin Historical Society. He published an eight-volume history of Wisconsin in 1914. In 1920, he and his sister, Leila, donated his collection of historical documents and references to the La Crosse Normal School Library.

Usher died in Milwaukee, on April 21, 1931, aged 78.

== Personal life and family ==
Ellis Baker Usher was eldest of six children born to Isaac Lane Usher and his wife Susanna Coffin (née Woodman). Ellis Baker Usher was named for his paternal grandfather, Ellis Baker Usher, a successful lumber businessman on the Saco River, who served as a delegate to the Maine constitutional convention, and later served in the Maine Senate. The younger Ellis Baker Usher also wrote a biography of his grandfather. His great-grandfather, Abijah Usher, was a member of the Massachusetts General Court, and had served in the American Revolutionary War.

Leila Usher, the American sculptor, was a younger sister of Ellis Baker Usher (the subject of this article).

Ellis Baker Usher was a descendant of Robert Usher, who emigrated from England to the Massachusetts Bay Colony about 1636 with his brother, Hezekiah Usher Sr., who became the first known book seller in the British North America colonies.

Ellis Baker Usher (the subject of this article) married Anna Meyers Bliss on November 27, 1888, in Milwaukee, Wisconsin. They had one daughter, Dorothy.

== Published works ==
- A Short Biographical Sketch of Ellis Baker Usher of Hollis, Maine, by his Grandson, Ellis Baker Usher of La Crosse, Wis. 1902.
- Usher, Ellis B. (1914). Wisconsin, its Story and Biography, 1848–1913. Vol. I. The Lewis Publishing Company.
- Usher, Ellis B. (1914). Wisconsin, its Story and Biography, 1848–1913. Vol. II. The Lewis Publishing Company.
- Usher, Ellis B. (1914). Wisconsin, its Story and Biography, 1848–1913. Vol. III. The Lewis Publishing Company.
- Usher, Ellis B. (1914). Wisconsin, its Story and Biography, 1848–1913. Vol. IV. The Lewis Publishing Company.
- Usher, Ellis B. (1914). Wisconsin, its Story and Biography, 1848–1913. Vol. V. The Lewis Publishing Company.
- Usher, Ellis B. (1914). Wisconsin, its Story and Biography, 1848–1913. Vol. VI. The Lewis Publishing Company.
- Usher, Ellis B. (1914). Wisconsin, its Story and Biography, 1848–1913. Vol. VII. The Lewis Publishing Company.
- Usher, Ellis B. (1914). Wisconsin, its Story and Biography, 1848–1913. Vol. VIII. The Lewis Publishing Company.

Party political offices
Preceded by William A. Walker	Chair of the Democratic Party of Wisconsin; March 29, 1887 – January 16, 1890	Succeeded by Edward C. Wall
