= Ellis Baker Usher (Maine politician) =

19th century American politician (1785–1855)

Ellis B. Usher

Member of the Maine Senate from the York County district
- In office January 1823 – January 1825 Serving with John McDonald & Mark Dennett
- Preceded by: Josiah W. Seaver, John McDonald, & Mark Dennett
- Succeeded by: Joseph Prime, George Scammon & John U. Parsons

Personal details
- Born: November 7, 1785 Medford, Massachusetts, U.S.
- Died: May 21, 1855 (aged 69) Buxton, Maine, U.S.
- Resting place: South Buxton Cemetery, Buxton
- Party: Whig; National Republican
- Spouses: Rebecca Randall (m. 1812; died 1819); Hannah Lane (m. 1820–1855)
- Children: with Rebecca Randall; Henry E. Usher^{(b. 1814; died 1827)}; Benjamin Jones Randall Usher^{(b. 1815; died 1816)}; Sarah Ellen Randall (Sands) (Bacon)^{(b. 1817; died 1903)}; with Hannah Lane; Rebecca R. Usher^{(b. 1821; died 1912)}; Martha Hooper (Osgood)^{(b. 1823; died 1893)}; Isaac Lane Usher^{(b. 1825; died 1889)}; Jane Maria Lane Usher^{(b. 1828; died 1832)}; Hannah Lane Usher^{(b. 1831; died 1832)}; Mary Usher^{(b. 1833; died 1833)}; Jane Maria Bradley (Webb)^{(b. 1836; died 1920)}
- Parent: Abijah Usher Sr. (father)
- Relatives: Abijah Usher Jr. (brother); Ellis Baker Usher (grandson); Leila Usher (granddaughter)
- Occupation: Lumberman

Ellis Baker Usher (November 7, 1785 – May 21, 1855) was an American lumber businessman and Whig politician from York County, Maine. He served as a delegate to the 1819–1820 convention which drafted the Constitution of Maine, then represented York County in the Maine Senate during the 1823 and 1824 sessions. At the time of his death, he was one of the largest lumbermen on the Saco River. In historical documents, his first name was sometimes incorrectly spelled "Elias".

His father, Abijah Usher Sr., and brother, Abijah Usher Jr., also served in the Massachusetts and Maine state legislatures.

== Biography ==
Ellis Baker Usher was born in Medford, Massachusetts, in November 1785. His mother died when he was about 5 years old, and he and his brother were sent to be raised by their maternal grandmother, Mary Weld (née Ruggles; 1737–1811). Neither brother was given much formal education, and at age 12, after his father suffered financial disaster, he and his brother, Abijah Usher Jr., were given a horse and sent east to find work in what is now Hollis, Maine.

Ellis was employed by Isaac Lane and Paul Coffin, earning five dollars a day and sending half his earnings back to his father. In 1804, he purchased a farm for his father in Hollis, which became the family homestead for several generations. With his next accumulation of wealth, he purchased a share of ownership in a saw mill, and opened a lumber store on the Saco River. At some point, a freshet on the river flooded his store and swept away $5,000 worth of logs (about $160,000 adjusted for inflation to 2025), leaving him broke and indebted. But the freshet also left his mill-site on an island, and created an inland pond that could be used to secure and store logs. He soon rebuilt his business and prospered again.

In 1819, Usher was elected to serve as a delegate to the convention charged with drafting a constitution for the new state of Maine. Usher played an active role in the debates of the convention, and ultimately became a signer of the final Constitution of Maine which was produced.

In the fall of 1822, Usher ran for a seat in the Maine Senate and was elected to represent York County, alongside Mark Dennett and John McDonald. All three were re-elected in 1823, but Usher did not run again in 1824.

Usher had another personal financial crisis in the Panic of 1837, when he was on the hook for $80,000 in debts for speculation on timber lands in northeast Maine. But he negotiated successfully with his creditors and paid off the debts within five years. His finances recovered again, and he grew to become one of the largest and most prosperous lumber dealers on the Saco River, continuing in the business up to his death in 1855. He left an estate valued at about $100,000 (about $3.7 million adjusted for inflation).

He died suddenly on May 21, 1855, possibly due to biliary colic.

== Personal life and family ==
Ellis Baker Usher was the elder of two sons born to Abijah Usher Sr. and his first wife Mary (née Weld (Note: Some bios say "Wells" but "Weld" seems the consensus.)). Abijah Usher Sr. had served in the American Revolutionary War, enlisting with the New Hampshire militia at age 16. After the war, he served as a captain in the Massachusetts militia and served as a representative in the Massachusetts General Court for Medford, Massachusetts, in 1809, 1810, and 1821. Ellis Baker Usher's younger brother, Abijah Usher Jr., became a colonel in the Maine militia and served in the Maine Legislature as a representative in 1821 and 1822, and as a state senator in 1829 and 1830.

According to a biography written by his grandson, Tucker Ellis Baker Usher, his namesake was Captain Ellis Baker, his aunt's grandfather.

Ellis Baker Usher was a descendant of Robert Usher, who emigrated from England to the Massachusetts Bay Colony about 1636 with his brother, Hezekiah Usher Sr., who became the first known book seller in the British North America colonies.

Ellis Baker Usher married twice, both marriages were to family members of his first employer and later business partner, Colonel Isaac Lane. Isaac Lane had commanded a regiment of U.S. infantry during the War of 1812, and before that had served as a private in his father's militia company in the American Revolutionary War. Ellis Baker Usher's first wife was Rebecca Randall, a stepdaughter of Lane. They married on November 12, 1812, but she died just seven years later. The first marriage produced three children, but one died in infancy and another died young. After his first wife's death, Usher married Isaac Lane's only surviving daughter, Hannah Lane, on November 26, 1820, who ultimately survived him. With his second wife, he had seven more children, though three of those children also died in infancy.

His only surviving son was Isaac Lane Usher, who went west to Wisconsin to work in the lumber industry for Cadwallader C. Washburn, and later became sheriff of La Crosse County, Wisconsin, and an assistant assessor of internal revenue. His son, Tucker Ellis Baker Usher, became a notable journalist and politician in Wisconsin, and wrote a biography of Ellis Baker Usher (the subject of this article). Leila Usher, the American sculptor, was a daughter of Isaac Lane Usher.
