= Henry Ussher =

Irish Protestant churchman (c.1550–1613)

The Right Reverend Henry Ussher
- Archbishop of Armagh; Primate of All Ireland
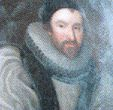
- Church: Church of Ireland
- Archdiocese: Armagh
- In office: 1595–1613
- Predecessor: John Garvey
- Successor: Christopher Hampton

Orders
- Consecration: August 1595

Personal details
- Born: c. 1550 Dublin, Ireland
- Died: 2 April 1613 Termonfechin, Ireland
- Buried: St. Peter's, Drogheda
- Spouse: (1) Margaret Elliott (2) Mary Smith
- Education: Magdalene College, Cambridge; University of Paris; University College, Oxford

Henry Ussher (c.1550 – 2 April 1613) was an Irish Protestant churchman, a founder of Trinity College Dublin, and Church of Ireland Archbishop of Armagh.

== Life ==
The second of five sons of Thomas Ussher by Margaret (d. January 1597), daughter of Henry Geydon, alderman of Dublin, he was born in Dublin about 1550. Ambrose Ussher and James Ussher, sons of his brother Arnold, were his nephews, while his sister Rose married John Garvey, his predecessor as Archbishop. Henry Ussher entered at Magdalene College, Cambridge, matriculating on 2 May 1567, and graduating B. A. in the first quarter of 1570. His studies continued at Paris and at Oxford, where he entered University College, was incorporated B.A. 1 July 1572, and graduated M.A. 11 July 1572. His first preferment was the treasurership of Christ Church, Dublin (1573); on 12 March 1580 he was made archdeacon of Dublin by Adam Loftus, with whom he was connected by marriage.

The project of converting St. Patrick's Cathedral, Dublin into a university, to replace the moribund Medieval University of Dublin, was mooted as early as 1563; Adam Loftus, when made Dean (28 January 1565), was put under a bond to resign the deanery when required for this purpose. In March 1570, James Stanyhurst, speaker of the Irish House of Commons, moved the house for the foundation of a university in Dublin as part of a system of national education. He renewed the proposal in December 1573. It met with no support in parliament. In January 1584 the lord deputy, Sir John Perrot, received instructions to draw up proposals for the conversion of St. Patrick's into a college. He submitted a plan in August. Loftus, now archbishop of Dublin, sent Ussher in November to London to frustrate the scheme, which was abandoned.

The matter was next taken up by the Dublin corporation, who offered (21 January 1591) the site of the Augustinian priory of All Saints', with land worth £20 a year. Ussher was again sent to London, with letters bearing the date 4 November 1591, to forward this new scheme. On 13 January 1592, he received a warrant (dated 21 December) granting royal assent for the erection. On 3 March 1592, the foundation charter passed the great seal. Ussher was named in it as one of the three fellows; he never acted as such, nor was he one of the original benefactors.

On the death (2 March 1595) of John Garvey, his brother-in-law, Ussher was appointed archbishop of Armagh (patent 22 July), and was consecrated in August 1595. A story told by Henry Fitzsimon, to the effect that Ussher had written against Cardinal Bellarmine, and his wife had burned the manuscript, was embellished by Pierre Bayle. He had an estate at Balsoon, County Meath, which he may have leased to his brother-in-law, Sir John Elliott, to whom he was always close. Sir John and his second wife Ismay built a church at Balsoon, of which only ruins remain. Ussher died at his episcopal palace at Termonfechin on Easter day, 2 April 1613, and was buried at St. Peter's, Drogheda.

== Family ==
He married, firstly (about 1573), Margaret, daughter of Thomas Elliott of Balreask, County Meath, Master Gunner for Ireland, and his wife Elizabeth Smart, and sister of Sir John Elliott, Baron of the Court of Exchequer (Ireland), by whom he had eight sons and two daughters; secondly, Mary Smith (who survived him), by whom he had three daughters. His widow remarried (1614) William FitzWilliam of Dundrum, Dublin, younger brother of Thomas FitzWilliam, 1st Viscount FitzWilliam, who died in 1616, and subsequently Sir Samuel Mayart, justice of the Court of Common Pleas (Ireland), who outlived her, and died sometime after February 1646.

His eldest son Marcus Ussher was MP for Armagh in the Parliament of 1613-15. His youngest son Robert Ussher was Provost of Trinity College Dublin 1629-1634 and Bishop of Kildare 1635-42. A third son Luke Ussher was Archdeacon of Armagh 1622-32. By the marriage of his daughter Rose to Sir Edward Trevor of Rostrevor, County Down, Ussher became the grandfather of Marcus Trevor, 1st Viscount Dungannon (1618–1670).
