= Luke Ussher =

Irish Anglican cleric (??–1632)

Luke Ussher was Archdeacon of Armagh from 1622 until his death on 6 November 1632.

The son of Archbishop Henry Ussher and his first wife Margaret Elliott, daughter of Thomas Elliott of Balreask, and brother of Marcus Ussher MP and of Robert Ussher, Bishop of Kildare, he was born in Kentstown, County Meath, and educated at Trinity College, Dublin. He held livings at Kentstown, Clonmore and Termonfeckin. He married Mary O'Connor and had at least five children.
