= Spiritual Milk for Boston Babes =

1656 book by John Cotton

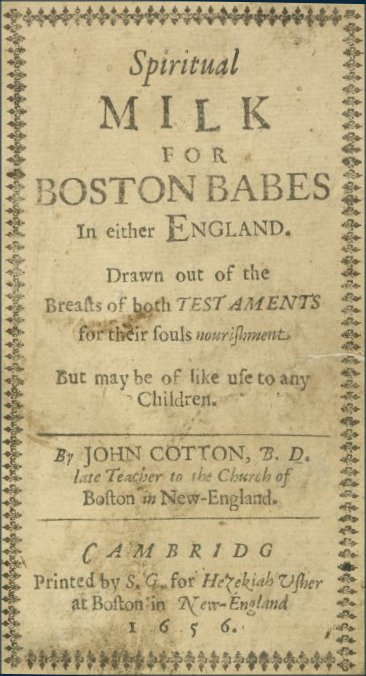
Cover page of 1656 edition, printed in America

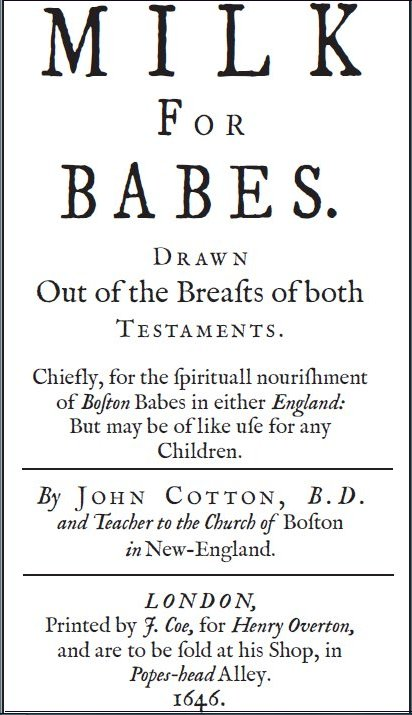
Cover page of 1646 edition, printed in London

Spiritual Milk for Boston Babes is a children's catechism by the English minister John Cotton. The 1656 catechism is the first known children's book published in the United States.

Cotton's catechism was originally printed in London during 1646. The New England full version of the work was introduced in 1656, printed by Samuel Green of Cambridge, Massachusetts for the bookseller Hezekiah Usher. This version was an octavo booklet.

Cotton's catechism consisted of fifteen pages, covering 64 questions and answers relating to the teachings of Puritanism and the Church. The topics covered included morality, manners, religious life, the Ten Commandments, and the last judgment. The material included references to specific passages of both the Old Testament and the New Testament, with 203 passages identified. The catechism remained in print in both England and New England for some 200 years after its introduction. There were eight known editions during the 17th century.

== Content ==
Cotton's catechism consisted of fifteen pages of 64 questions and answers relating to teachings of Puritanism and the Church. It discussed morals, manners, religious life, the Ten Commandments, and the last judgment. In the seventeenth century, many English catechisms had over 100 questions and answers for the student of Christianity to remember. The 64 questions and answers in Cotton's catechism made reference to 203 passages from the Old and the New Testaments. "Spiritual Milk for Boston Babes" and other similar catechisms encapsulate for children the good news of Jesus Christ. "Spiritual Milk" is a witness to the transformative work of Jesus and an encouragement to trust in the redeeming work of God.

== Versions ==
Cotton's catechism was originally printed in London in 1646. The full title in Great Britain was Milk for Babes. Drawn out of the Breasts of Both Testaments. Chiefly, for the Spiritually Nourishment of Boston Babes in Either England: But May Be of Like Use for Any Children. It was printed in London, England, by J. Coe for bookseller Henry Overton. The short title in Great Britain of the prior original work of 1646 is Milk for Babes.

The New England full version was called Spiritual Milk for Boston Babes in Either England. Drawn out of the Breasts of Both Testaments for Their Souls Nourishment but May Be of Like Use to Any Children. By John Cotton, B.D. late Teacher to the Church of Boston in New England. Cambridge. Printed by S. G. for Hezekiah Usher at Boston in New England, 1656. Samuel Green of Cambridge, Massachusetts, printed it in 1656 for bookseller Hezekiah Usher. It was an octavo booklet. A copy of this book was supposedly purchased by the Lenox Library of Massachusetts for $400 in 1895. Cotton's catechism remained in print in both England and New England for some 200 years after the mid seventeenth century. Eight known editions have been identified from the seventeenth century alone.

== Legacy ==
Spiritual Milk for Boston Babes became part of The New England Primer in the mid of the eighteenth century and remained popular into the mid nineteenth century. Spiritual Milk for Boston Babes was called "The Catechism of New England".

== Bibliography ==
- Bunge, Marcia JoAnn, ed. (2001). The Child in Christian Thought. Wm. B. Eerdmans Publishing. ISBN 978-0-8028-4693-8.
- Eames, Wilerforce (1898). Early New England Catechisms: A Bibliographical Account of Some Catechisms Published before the Year 1800, for Use in New England. New York B. Franklin.
- Ford, Worthington Chauncey (1917). The Boston Book Market, 1679–1700. The Club of odd volumes. p. 30.
- Hawes, Joseph M.; Hiner, N. Ray (November 14, 1985). American Childhood: A Research Guide and Historical Handbook. Greenwood Press. ISBN 978-0-313-23337-1.
- Hubbell, Jay Broadus. American Literature. Ardent Media.
- Hunt, Peter (April 15, 2013). International Companion Encyclopedia of Children's Literature. Routledge. ISBN 978-1-134-87994-6.
- Library of Congress (1982). Library of Congress Acquisitions: Rare Book and Special Collections Division. The Library of Congress.
- Littlefield, George Emery (1900). Early Boston booksellers 1642–1711. The Club of odd volumes.
- Littlefield, George Emery (1904). Early schools and school-books of New England. The Club of Odd Volumes.
- Murray, Gail Schmunk (November 12, 1998). American children's literature and the construction of childhood. Twayne Publishers. ISBN 978-0-8057-4107-0.
- Davidson, Marshall B.; McTigue, Bernard (1988). Treasures of the New York Public Library. H.N. Abrams. ISBN 978-0-8109-1354-7.
- Rice, Edwin Wilbur (1917). The Sunday-school Movement, 1780–1917, and the American Sunday-school Union, 1817–1917. American Sunday-school union. p. 73.
- Silvey, Anita (1995). Children's Books and Their Creators. Houghton Mifflin Harcourt. ISBN 978-0-395-65380-7.
- Spurgeon, Charles (2012). From the Library of Charles Spurgeon: Selections From Writers Who Influenced His Spiritual Journey. Baker Books. ISBN 978-1-4412-7011-5.
- Tebbel, John William (1972). A History of Book Publishing in the United States: The creation of an industry, 1630–1865. R. R. Bowker Company. ISBN 978-0-8352-0489-7.
- Thomas, Isaiah (1874). The History of Printing in America: With a Biography of Printers, and an Account of Newspapers. To which is Prefixed a Concise View of the Discovery and Progress of the Art in Other Parts of the World. In Two Volumes. From the Press of Isaiah Thomas, jun. Isaac Sturtevant, Printer. p. 205.
