= Christopher Hampton (bishop) =

English archbishop

The Right Reverend Christopher Hampton D.D.
- Archbishop of Armagh; Primate of All Ireland
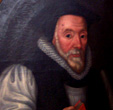
- Church: Church of Ireland
- Archdiocese: Armagh
- Appointed: 16 April 1613
- In office: 1613-1625
- Predecessor: Henry Ussher
- Successor: James Ussher

Orders
- Ordination: 1580
- Consecration: 8 May 1613 by Thomas Jones

Personal details
- Born: 1552 Calais, France
- Died: 3 January 1625 (age 72) Drogheda, Ireland
- Buried: St Peter's Church, Drogheda
- Education: Trinity College, Cambridge

Christopher Hampton (1552–1625) was an Englishman who was the Church of Ireland Archbishop of Armagh from 1613 to 1625.

== Family and education ==
He was born at Calais in 1552, son of John Hampton (of Frethby or Freeby in Leicestershire, a Merchant of the Staple in Calais, and a citizen of London and member of the Skinner's Company) and his wife Alice. His name is also given as John in the printed Patent Rolls. He was educated at Trinity College, Cambridge, where he graduated B.A. 1572, M.A. 1575, B.D. 1582 and D.D. 1598. He became a Fellow of Trinity in 1574.

== Church career ==
He was ordained as a priest in 1580 and was vicar of Chesterton, Cambridge from 1585 to 1589 and Rector at Calbourne on the Isle of Wight from 1589 to 1612. By 1606, he was chaplain to Henry Wriothesley, 3rd Earl of Southampton and also had the opportunity to preach before James I on occasions, when he preached in support of royal supremacy and episcopacy. He became a royal chaplain and continued to attack presbyterianism and defend episcopacy.

On the death of Brutus Babington, Bishop of Derry, Hampton was nominated to the see by king's letter dated 21 December 1611, and was elected. He was not in fact consecrated to the see of Derry, but to that of Armagh, vacant by the death of Henry Ussher, by king's letter dated 16 April 1613, and by patent of 7 May 1613, and was consecrated the next day in St. Patrick's Cathedral, Dublin. He was placed in the role with the influence of his patrons in order to continue to reinforce royal preferences in civil and ecclesiastical matters, and to impose more discipline on the Church of Ireland. A few days after his consecration, on the opening of parliament by the lord deputy, Arthur Chichester, 1st Baron Chichester, Lord Deputy of Ireland, Hampton the new primate preached in the cathedral before the peers. He was appointed king's almoner in 1617 (being the first to hold that office), and a member of the Irish privy council.

He was described as "a man of grave deportment, and of considerable learning". He faced much opposition in his new role, including challenges from Thomas Jones and Lancelot Bulkeley, Archbishops of Dublin, to the right of the see of Armagh to the primacy of Ireland (this was a dispute which had been going on intermittently for centuries, long before the Reformation). He also enforced conformity in ceremonial practices against the more puritan members of the church. He took a hard line against both Roman Catholics and Scottish Presbyterian settlers in Ulster. In 1622 James Ussher, then bishop of Meath, preached a sermon before the Lord Deputy to which exceptions were taken by the recusants. Hampton sent him a letter of mild rebuke, but indicating that the sermon had been in some respects indiscreet.

By 1622 Hampton had (using his own personal wealth as well as church funds) built a palace at Drogheda, then the principal place of residence of the archbishops, and restored the cathedral church of St. Patrick, Armagh, which had been reduced to ruins by Shane O'Neill. He recast the great bell, and repaired the old episcopal residence at Armagh, to which he added new buildings. He died at Drogheda on 3 January 1624/5, and was buried in the parish church of St. Peter there. While he died unmarried, he settled his brother's family on lands belonging to the see at Kilmore, County Armagh, on long leases at favourable terms, where their descendants continued to live for generations.
