= John McDonald (Maine politician) =

American politician

John McDonald (April 6, 1773 – 1826) was an American politician from Maine. McDonald was a member of the 1st Maine Senate after statehood. He served 4 terms in the Maine Senate, retiring in 1824. Originally from Gorham, Maine, McDonald was an early settler in Limerick, Maine. His son, Moses, later served in Maine government and as a two-term Congressman during the 1850s.
