= Robert Howell Craster Usher =

English RAF officer and rugby player (1896–1924)

Flt Lt Robert Howell Craster Usher MC AFC was born in 1896 and was christened in East Lulworth, Dorset, on 15 November 1896. He had a short but distinguished career in both the military during World War One, and subsequently, playing rugby. He died in a flying accident at the age of 27.

== Military service ==
In 1914, he was commissioned a 2nd lieutenant in the 3rd Battalion of the Duke of Edinburgh's Wiltshire Regiment, and was promoted to captain in 1915. Usher applied to join the Royal Flying Corps in 1916 and was posted to 6 Reserve Squadron at Catterick for training on 22 March 1916. Following his successful graduation, Usher was seconded to the Royal Flying Corps as a flying officer on 11 May 1916 and posted to 27 Squadron at Treizennes, France, on 15 June 1916.

Usher sustained combat damage and was wounded in the leg and foot while bombing Marcoing, and force-landed at Moroeuil, on 30 July 1916, but was recognized for this action soon afterwards. He engaged and drove off three enemy aircraft and, on another occasion, engaged five enemy aircraft, continuing the battle despite injury until his engine stopped, and was awarded the Military Cross on 25 August 1916.

Promoted to temporary captain and appointed an equipment officer 1st class on 22 August 1917, Usher returned to the United Kingdom for the role, but was involved in a flying accident at Radford Aerodrome, Coventry, on 1 October 1917 when the engine of his BE2e biplane failed and he force-landed the aircraft with no engine.

His work off the front was recognised just prior to the Armistice, and he was awarded the Air Force Cross on 2 November 1918. On 1 August 1921, Usher's secondment to the RAF was extended by a further two years, but the following year was granted a permanent commission as a flight lieutenant in the RAF and resigned his commission as a lieutenant in the Wiltshire Regiment. His RAF postings during this period are unclear.

== Rugby Union ==
In addition to his military service, Robert was a keen Rugby Union player. During his playing career, he played for London Scottish and Leicester team sides and in 1920 was selected to play for an Anglo-Scottish side against the Scotland XV on the Christmas Day International Trial match. In 1921 he was captain of the Rugby team at RAF Netheravon a team which included Basil Embry. Usher also played as a Forward in RAF matches again the Army and Royal Navy, and captained the RAF Rugby team in 1924.

== Death ==
Usher was posted to the RAF Depot at Uxbridge on 16 April 1923, and to the Headquarters of the Superintendent of Reserves at RAF Northolt on 1 May 1923. On 5 June 1924, he undertook a test flight in de Havilland DH.42 'Dingo', J7006, which belonged to No. 41 Squadron RAF. The aircraft suffered structural failure and broke up in mid-air near RAF Northolt, and he was killed, aged 27. He was the son of Robert & Alice M. Usher. No further circumstances are known and there is no explanation of why Usher was flying an aircraft being flight tested by No. 41 Squadron RAF.

The Singapore Free Press and Mercantile Advertiser reported his death as a severe loss to rugby.
