= Charles C. Paine =

American politician

Charles C. Paine (August 13, 1824 – February 16, 1907) was a member of the Wisconsin State Assembly.

== Biography ==
Paine was born on August 13, 1824, in Chardon, Ohio. His father was James Harvey Paine (1791–1879). James was a general in the state militia. The younger Paine died in 1907 and was buried at Forest Home Cemetery in Milwaukee, Wisconsin.

== Assembly career ==
Paine was a member of the Assembly during the 1880 session. He was a Republican.
