= Ambrose Ussher =

Irish Protestant clergyman and scholar

Ambrose Ussher (1582?–1629) was an Irish Protestant clergyman and scholar, a fellow of Trinity College, Dublin and rector in the Church of Ireland, known as a biblical translator.

== Life ==
Born in Dublin about 1582, he was third but second surviving son of Arland Ussher and his wife Margaret. James Ussher, archbishop of Armagh, was his elder brother. He is said to have been for a time at Cambridge. He graduated M.A. and was elected fellow of the recently established Trinity College, Dublin.

He became learned in Hebrew and Arabic. Among his correspondents was Henry Briggs, the mathematician. His career as a fellow was interrupted when he had to be constrained because of his madness, and he died young.

Ussher died at Dublin, unmarried, and was buried on 4 March 1629.

== Works ==
Before the completion of the Authorised Version of the Bible, Ussher prepared a translation from the original Hebrew, which he dedicated to James I, with the fond, but unlikely hope that the King wanted as many English translations of the bible as possible. It remained in manuscript in three volumes in the library of Trinity College, Dublin. His translation is significantly less anachronistic than the Authorized Version - lust instead of concupiscence, for example - and was a genuinely original work, based on Hebrew and Greek texts, but, that said, it was clearly dependent upon earlier English translations. The only work he published was a ‘Brief Catechism very well serving for the Instruction of Youth,’ printed at Dublin without date. He left, however, thirty-four works in manuscript, preserved in Trinity College, Dublin. They included volumes of sermons, commentaries on scripture, and notes on classical authors. Besides the translation of the Bible, they included:

- ‘Disputationes contra Bellarminum,’ 4 vols.
- ‘An Arabian Dictionary and Grammar.’
- ‘Laus Astronomiæ.’
- ‘De Usu Sphæræ cum numero Constellationum.’
- ‘Summaria Religionis Christianæ Methodus.’
- ‘Of the Kingdom of Great Britain, or a Discourse on the Question of Scotland's Union with England.’
- ‘The Principles of Religion explained in English, Greek, Latin, and Hebrew.’
- ‘Confutatio Errorum Ecclesiæ Romanæ.’
- ‘Prolegomena Arabica.’
- ‘Collectanea Arabica et Hebraica.’

== Notes ==
Attribution

This article incorporates text from a publication now in the public domain: "Ussher, Ambrose". Dictionary of National Biography. London: Smith, Elder & Co. 1885–1900.
