= Leila Usher =

American sculptor (1859–1955)

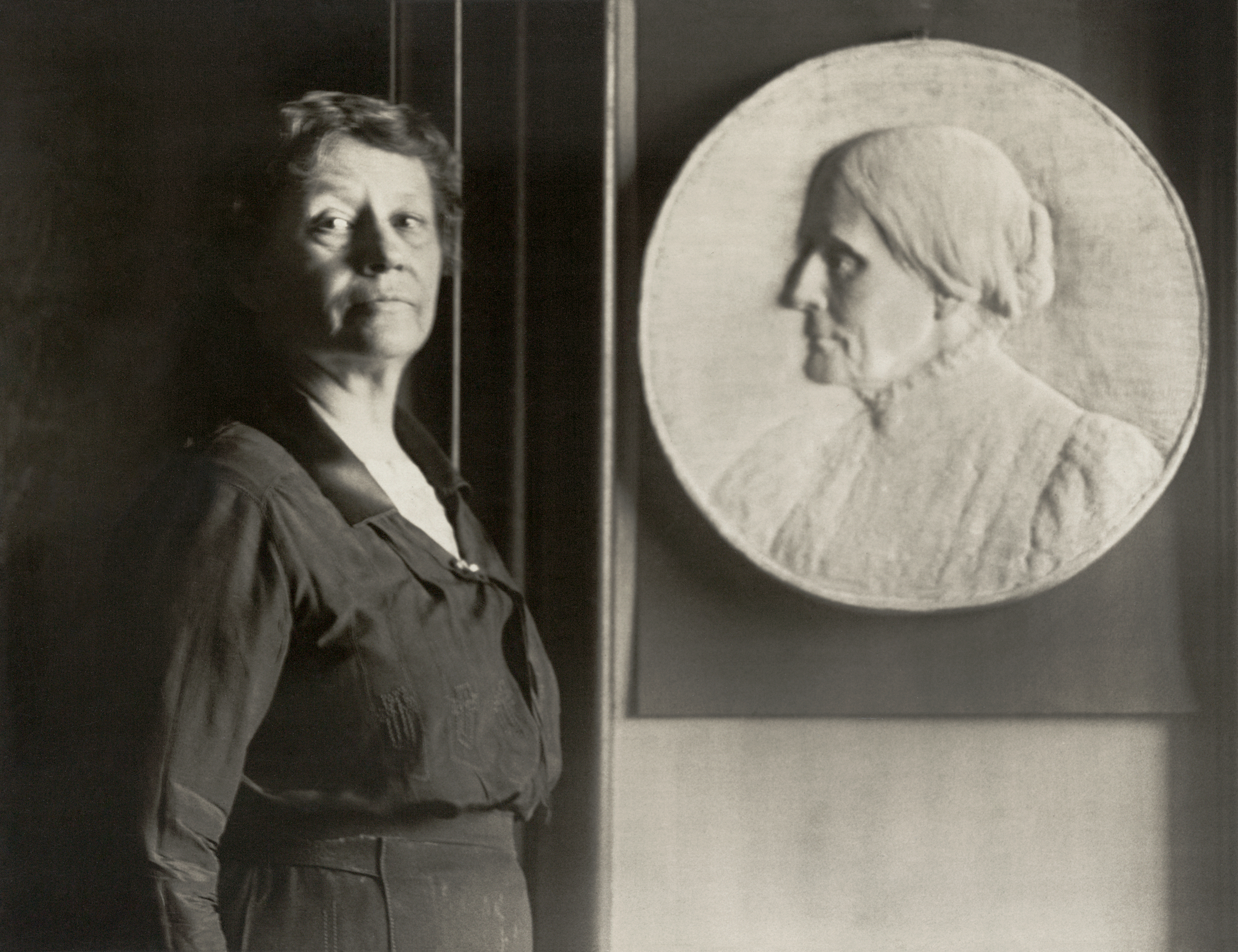
- Leila Usher with her bas-relief of Susan B. Anthony in 1922
- Born: Leila Woodman Usher; August 26, 1859; Onalaska, Wisconsin
- Died: August 13, 1955 (aged 95); New York City, New York
- Occupation: Sculptor

Leila Usher (August 26, 1859 – August 13, 1955) was an American sculptor.

== Biography ==
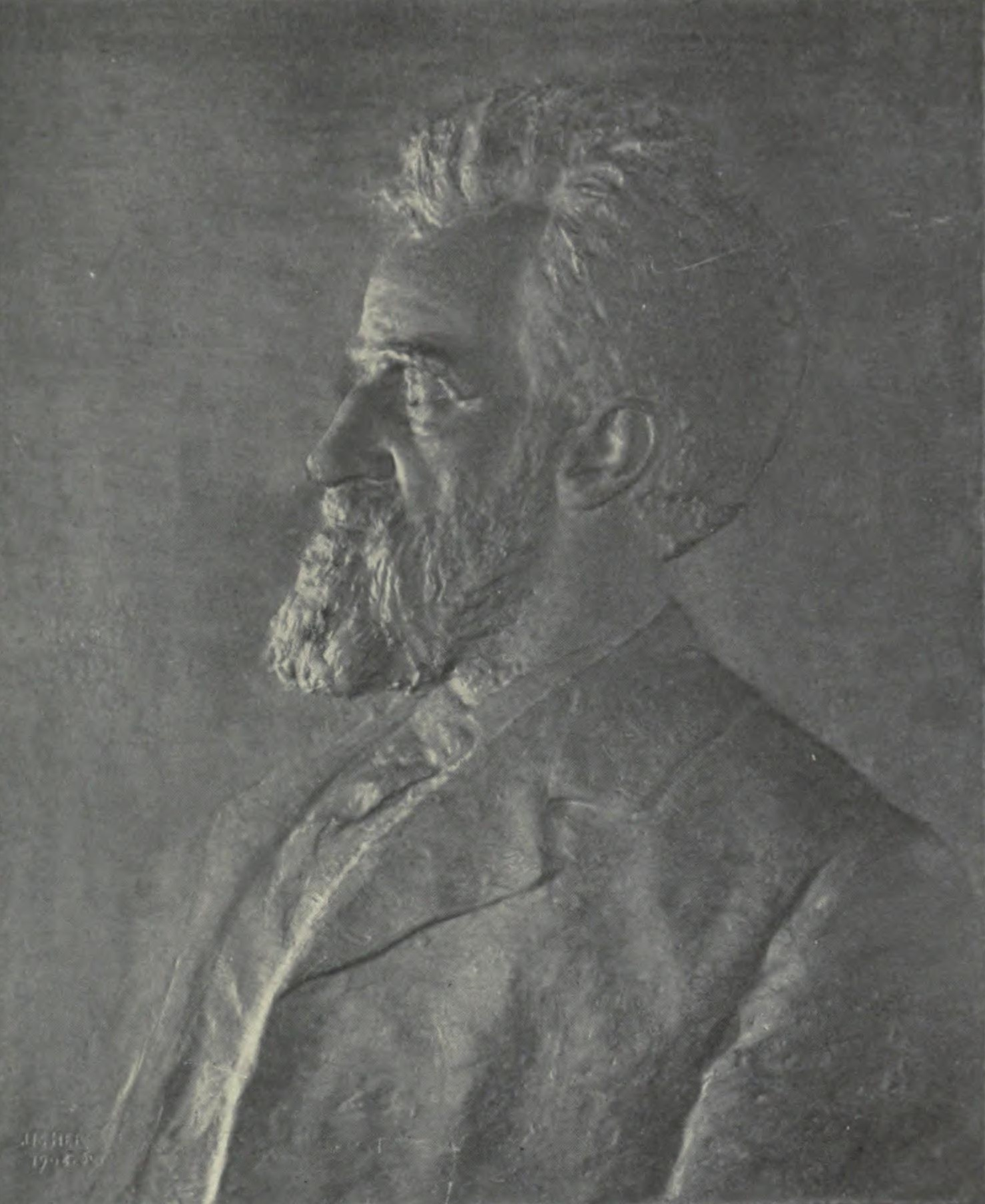
Bas-relief portrait of paleontologist Nathaniel Shaler, c. 1909

Leila Woodman Usher was born in Onalaska, Wisconsin on August 26, 1859, to parents Isaac Lane Usher and Susannah Coffin Woodman. She was a pupil of English sculptor H. H. Kitson in Boston, American George Brewster in Cambridge, and Irish-American Augustus Saint-Gaudens in New York, and also studied abroad in Paris and Rome.

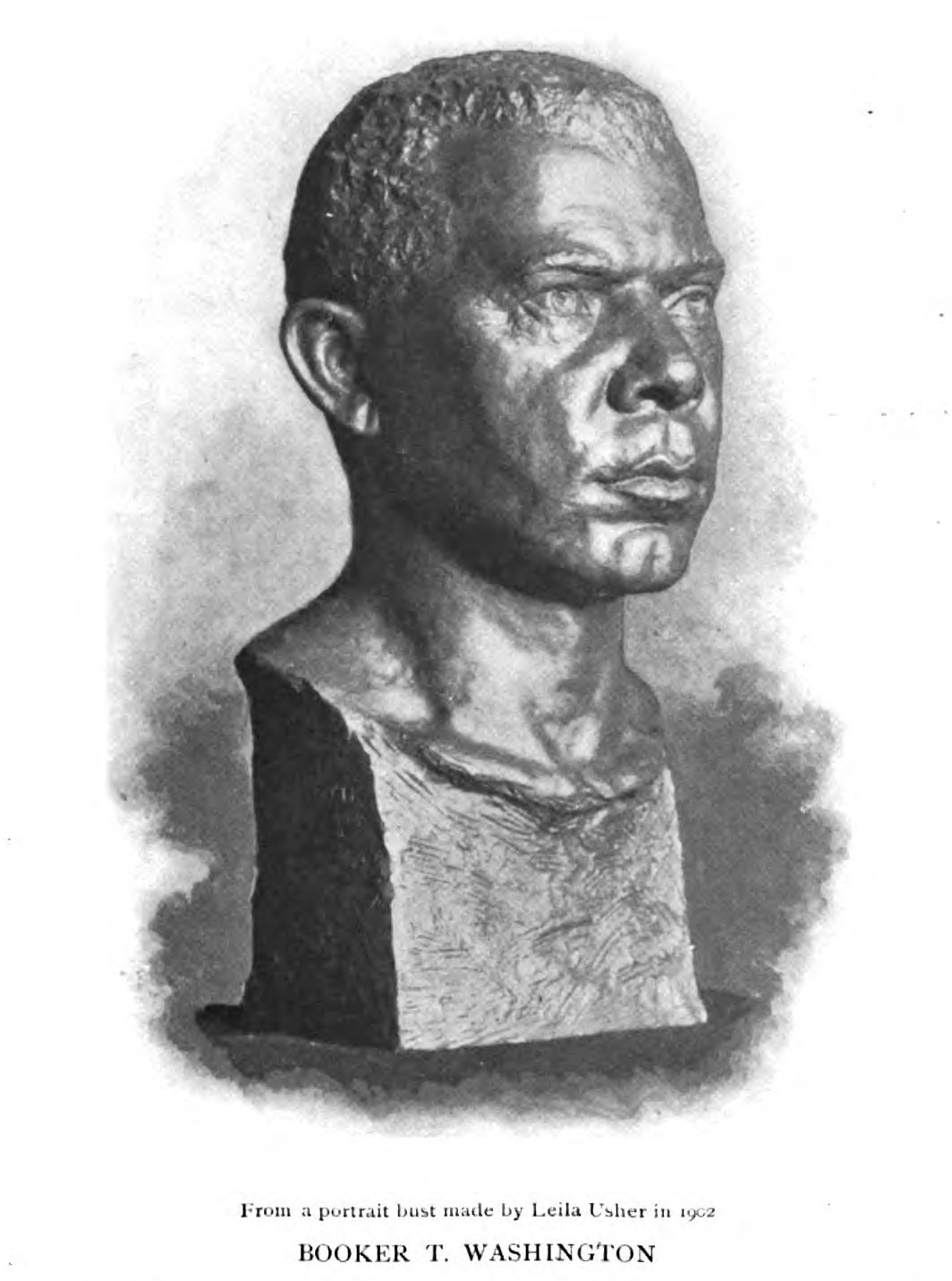
Bust of Booker T. Washington by Leila Usher as appeared in his writing "Heroes in black skin" in The Century Magazine V.66 No. 4, September 1903

Her best-known work is a 1902 bust of educator Booker T. Washington commissioned by the Tuskegee Institute. She produced bas-relief portraits of many other prominent figures such as scholar Francis James Child, minister Elijah Kellogg, and geologist John Wesley Powell.

Usher also created a bronze medallion of social reformer Susan B. Anthony, presented on April 21, 1902, to Bryn Mawr College. Anthony herself attended the ceremony and addressed the audience after the presentation. On September 27, 1915, Usher exhibited a replica of medallion at the Exhibition of Painting and Sculpture by Women Artists for the Benefit of Woman Suffrage Campaign held in New York, notable because it was the only portrait of a suffragist out of the 153 works displayed.

Usher received the Bronze Medal at the 1895 Atlanta Exposition, and her work was also awarded at the 1915 Panama–Pacific International Exposition. Usher's sculptures are held in the collections of institutions such as Bowdoin College, Bryn Mawr College, Hampton University, Johns Hopkins University, and Radcliffe College.

She died at St. Luke's Hospital in New York on August 13, 1955, aged 95.
