= James Ussher =

Anglican Archbishop of Armagh (1581–1656)

The Right Reverend James Ussher
- Archbishop of Armagh; Primate of All Ireland
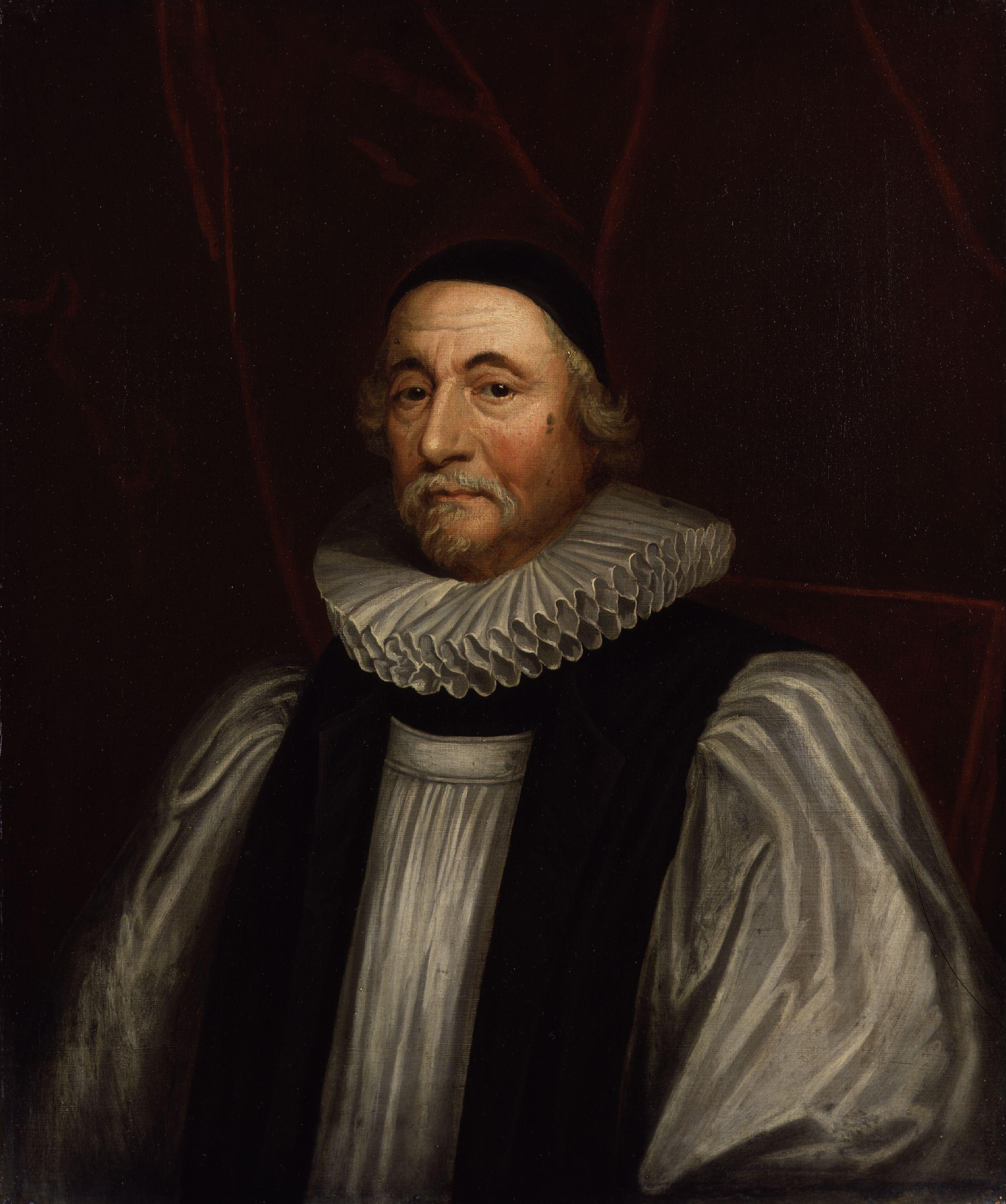
- Church: Church of Ireland
- See: Armagh
- Appointed: 21 March 1625
- In office: 1625–1656
- Predecessor: Christopher Hampton
- Successor: John Bramhall (from 1661)
- Other posts: Professor, Trinity College Dublin; Chancellor, St Patrick's Cathedral, Dublin; Prebend of Finglas.
- Previous post: Bishop of Meath (1621–1625)

Orders
- Ordination: 1602
- Consecration: 2 December 1621 by Christopher Hampton

Personal details
- Born: 4 January 1581 Dublin, Kingdom of Ireland
- Died: 21 March 1656 (aged 75) Reigate, Surrey, England
- Buried: Chapel of St Erasmus, Westminster Abbey
- Denomination: Anglican
- Education: Trinity College Dublin (B.A., M.A., B.D., D.D.)
- Coat of arms: James Ussher's coat of arms

James Ussher (or Usher; 4 January 1581 – 21 March 1656) was the Church of Ireland Archbishop of Armagh and Primate of All Ireland between 1625 and 1656. He was a prolific Irish scholar and church leader, who today is most famous for his identification of the genuine letters of the church father, Ignatius of Antioch, and for his chronology that sought to establish the time and date of the creation as "the entrance of the night preceding the 23rd day of October ... the year before Christ 4004"; that is, around 6 pm on 22 October 4004 BC, per the proleptic Julian calendar.

== Education ==
Ussher was born in Dublin to a well-to-do family. His maternal grandfather, James Stanihurst, had been speaker of the Irish parliament. Ussher's father, Arland Ussher, was a clerk in chancery who married Stanihurst's daughter, Margaret (by his first wife Anne Fitzsimon), who was reportedly a Roman Catholic.

Ussher's younger and only surviving brother, Ambrose, became a distinguished scholar of Arabic and Hebrew. According to his chaplain and biographer, Nicholas Bernard, the elder brother was taught to read by two blind, spinster aunts. A gifted polyglot, he entered Dublin Free School and then the newly founded (1592) Trinity College Dublin on 9 January 1594, at the age of thirteen (not an unusual age at the time). He had received his Bachelor of Arts degree by 1598 and was a fellow and MA by 1600 (though Bernard claims he did not gain his MA till 1601). In May 1602, he was ordained in the Trinity College Chapel as a deacon in the Protestant, established, Church of Ireland (and possibly priest on the same day, while Martin Gorst says that he became a priest on 20 December 1601) by his uncle.

Ussher went on to become Chancellor of St Patrick's Cathedral, Dublin in 1605 and Prebend of Finglas. He became Professor of Theological Controversies at Trinity College and a Bachelor of Divinity in 1607, Doctor of Divinity in 1612, and then Vice-Chancellor in 1615 and vice-provost in 1616. In 1613, he married Phoebe, daughter of a previous Vice-Provost, Luke Challoner, and published his first work. In 1615, he was closely involved with the drawing up of the first confession of faith of the Church of Ireland, the Irish Articles of Religion.

== Early life and career ==
James was born in the parish of St. Nicholas, to Arland Ussher (1545–1598) and Margaret Ussher (née Stanihurst) (1547–1601). It is recorded in Alfred Webb's, A Compendium of Irish Biography (1878) that his father, a clerk in the court of Chancery, was said to have been descended from one, Neville, who came over (to Ireland) with King John in the capacity of usher and had changed his name to that of his office. James was taught to read by two aunts who had been blind from infancy, to whom he ever afterwards looked back with affection and respect. From eight to thirteen years of age, he attended the school kept by Fullerton and Hamilton, private emissaries of James VI of Scotland, sent to keep up his influence in Ireland, in view of the prospect of his succeeding to the throne of England and Ireland."

James's abilities, diligence, and loving disposition from youth are described as "attracting the esteem of all with whom he came in contact." He became one of the first and leading scholars of Trinity College Dublin (opened 1593).

In the beginning of 1614, he married his cousin, Phoebe, daughter of his maternal uncle Dr Lucas Challanor. Webb tells how Phoebe had been enjoined by her father's will, bequeathing her a considerable property, not to marry any other than Dr. Ussher, "should he propose himself."

1619 Ussher travelled to England, where he remained for two years.

His and Phoebe's only child was Elizabeth Ussher (1619–93), who married Sir Timothy Tyrrell, of Oakley, Buckinghamshire. She was the mother of James Tyrrell.

Dr. Ussher became prominent after meeting James I. In 1621, James I nominated Ussher Bishop of Meath. He became a national figure in Ireland, becoming Privy Councillor in 1623 and an increasingly substantial scholar. A noted collector of Irish manuscripts, he made them available for research to fellow scholars such as his friend, Sir James Ware.

From 1623 until 1626, he was again in England and was excused from his episcopal duties to study church history. He was nominated Primate of All Ireland and Archbishop of Armagh in 1625 and succeeded Christopher Hampton, who had succeeded Ussher's uncle Henry twelve years earlier.

== Primate of All Ireland ==
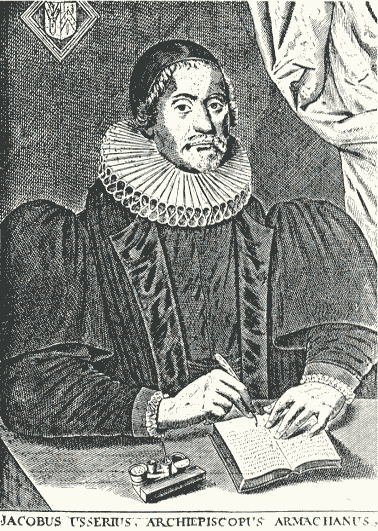
Archbishop James Ussher (1581–1656)

After his consecration in 1626, Ussher found himself in turbulent political times. Tension was rising between England and Spain. To secure Ireland Charles I offered Irish Catholics a series of concessions, including religious toleration, known as The Graces, in exchange for money for the upkeep of the army. Ussher was a convinced Calvinist. He was dismayed that Papists might obtain power. He called a secret meeting of the Irish bishops in his house in November 1626, the result being the "Judgement of the Arch-Bishops and Bishops of Ireland". This begins:

The religion of the papists is superstitious and idolatrous; their faith and doctrine erroneous and heretical; their church in respect of both, apostatical; to give them, therefore, a toleration, or to consent that they may freely exercise their religion, and profess their faith and doctrine, is a grievous sin.

The Judgement was not published until it was read out at the end of a series of sermons against the Graces given at Dublin in April 1627. Following Thomas Wentworth's attainder in April 1641, King Charles and the Privy Council of England instructed the Irish Lords Justices on 3 May 1641 to publish the required Bills to enact the Graces. However, the law reforms were not properly implemented before the rebellion in late 1641.

During a four-year interregnum between Lord Deputies from 1629 on, there was an increase in efforts to impose religious conformity on Ireland. In 1633, Ussher wrote to the new Archbishop of Canterbury, William Laud, in an effort to gain support for the imposition of recusancy fines on Irish Catholics. Thomas Wentworth, who arrived as the new Lord Deputy in Ireland in 1633, deflected the pressure for conformity by stating that, firstly, the Church of Ireland itself would have to be properly resourced, and he set about its re-endowment. He settled the long-running primacy dispute between the sees of Armagh and Dublin in Armagh's favour. The two clashed on the subject of the theatre: Ussher had the usual Puritan antipathy to the stage, whereas Wentworth was a keen theatre-goer: against Ussher's opposition, he oversaw the foundation of Ireland's first theatre, the Werburgh Street Theatre.

Ussher soon found himself at odds with the rise of Arminianism and Wentworth and Laud's desire for conformity between the Church of England and the more Calvinistic Church of Ireland. Ussher resisted this pressure at a convocation in 1634, ensuring that the English Articles of Religion were adopted as well as the Irish articles, not instead of them, and that the Irish canons had to be redrafted based on the English ones rather than replaced by them. Theologically, he was a Calvinist, although on the matter of the atonement, he was (somewhat privately) a hypothetical universalist. His most significant influence in this regard was John Davenant, later an English delegate to the Synod of Dort, who managed to significantly soften that Synod's teaching regarding limited atonement.

In 1633, Ussher had supported the appointment of Archbishop Laud as Chancellor of the University of Dublin. He had hoped that Laud would help to impose order on what was, Ussher accepted, a somewhat mismanaged institution. Laud did that, rewriting the charter and statutes to limit the authority of the fellows and ensure that the appointment of the provost was under royal control. In 1634, he imposed on the college an Arminian provost, William Chappell, whose theological views and peremptory style of government were antithetical to everything for which Ussher stood. By 1635, it was apparent that Ussher had lost de facto control of the church to John Bramhall, Bishop of Derry, in everyday matters and to Laud in matters of policy.

William M. Abbott, Associate Professor of History at Fairfield University, argues that he was an effective and politically important bishop and archbishop. The Oxford Dictionary of National Biography notes that he was reactive and sought conciliation rather than confrontation. The story that he successfully opposed attempts to reintroduce the Irish language for use in church services by William Bedell, the Bishop of Kilmore, has been refuted.

Ussher certainly preferred to be a scholar when he could be. He engaged in extensive disputations with Roman Catholic theologians, and even as a student, he challenged a Jesuit relative, Henry Fitzsimon (Ussher's mother was Catholic), to dispute the identification of the Pope publicly with the Antichrist. Ussher had an obsession with "Jesuits disguised as" Covenanters in Scotland, highwaymen when he was robbed, non-conformists in England; it was a remarkable list.

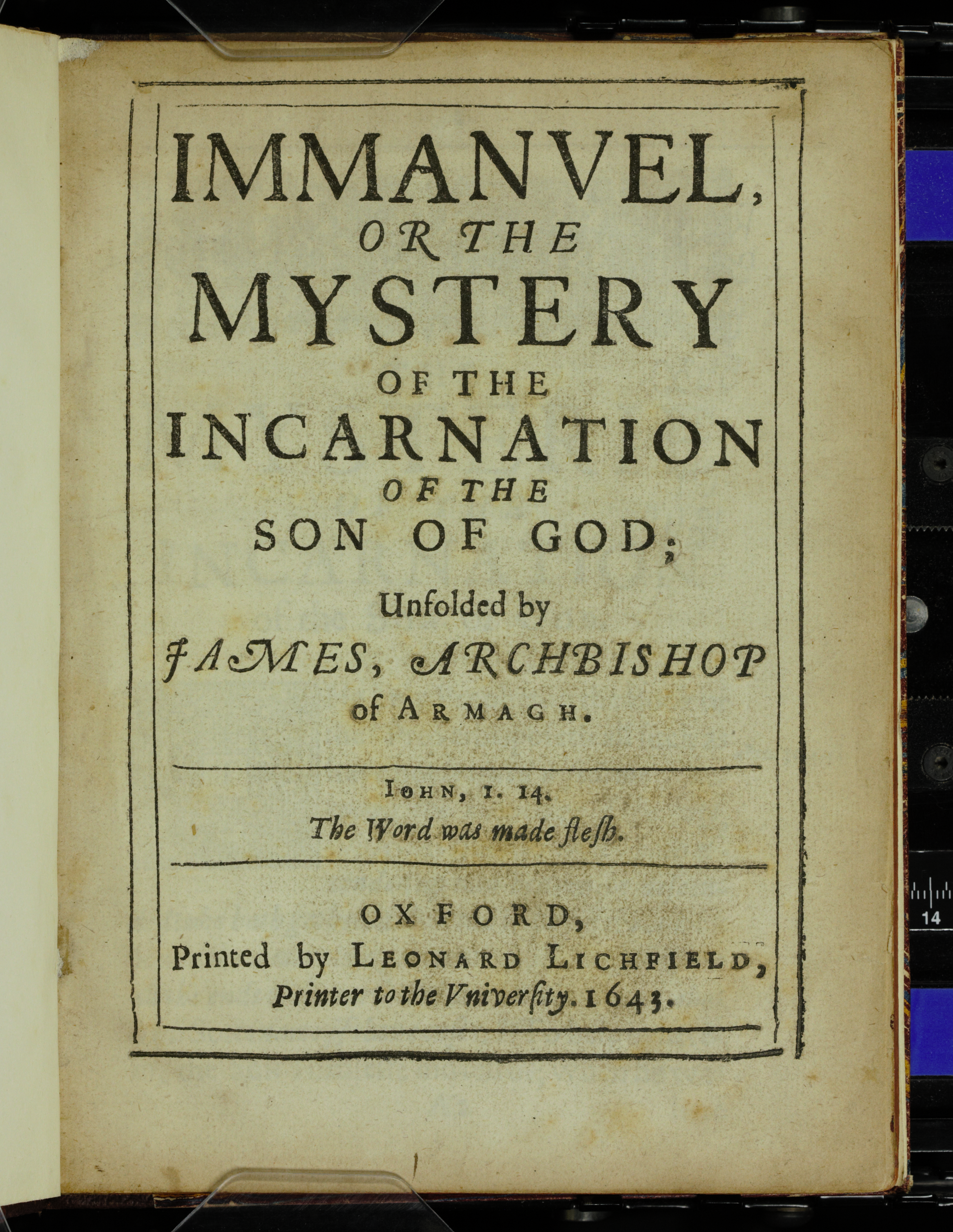
The title page of "Immanuel, or the Mystery of the Incarnation of the Son of God," authored in 1643.

However, Ussher also wrote extensively on theology, patristics and ecclesiastical history, and these subjects gradually displaced his anti-Catholic work. After Convocation in 1634, Ussher left Dublin for his episcopal residence at Drogheda, where he concentrated on his archdiocese and his research. In 1631, he produced a new edition of a work first published in 1622, his "Discourse on the Religion Anciently Professed by the Irish", a ground-breaking study of the early Irish church, which sought to demonstrate how it differed from Rome and was, instead, much closer to the later Protestant church. This was to prove highly influential, establishing the idea that the Church of Ireland was the true successor of the early Celtic church.

In 1639, he published the most substantial history of Christianity in Britain to that date, Britannicarum ecclesiarum antiquitates – the antiquities of the British churches, in which he gathered together many previously unpublished manuscript sources. Ussher was very reluctant to arrive at firm judgements as to the sources' authenticity – hence his devotion of a whole chapter to the imaginative but invented stories of King Lucius and the creation of a Christian episcopate in Britain.

== Wars of the Three Kingdoms ==
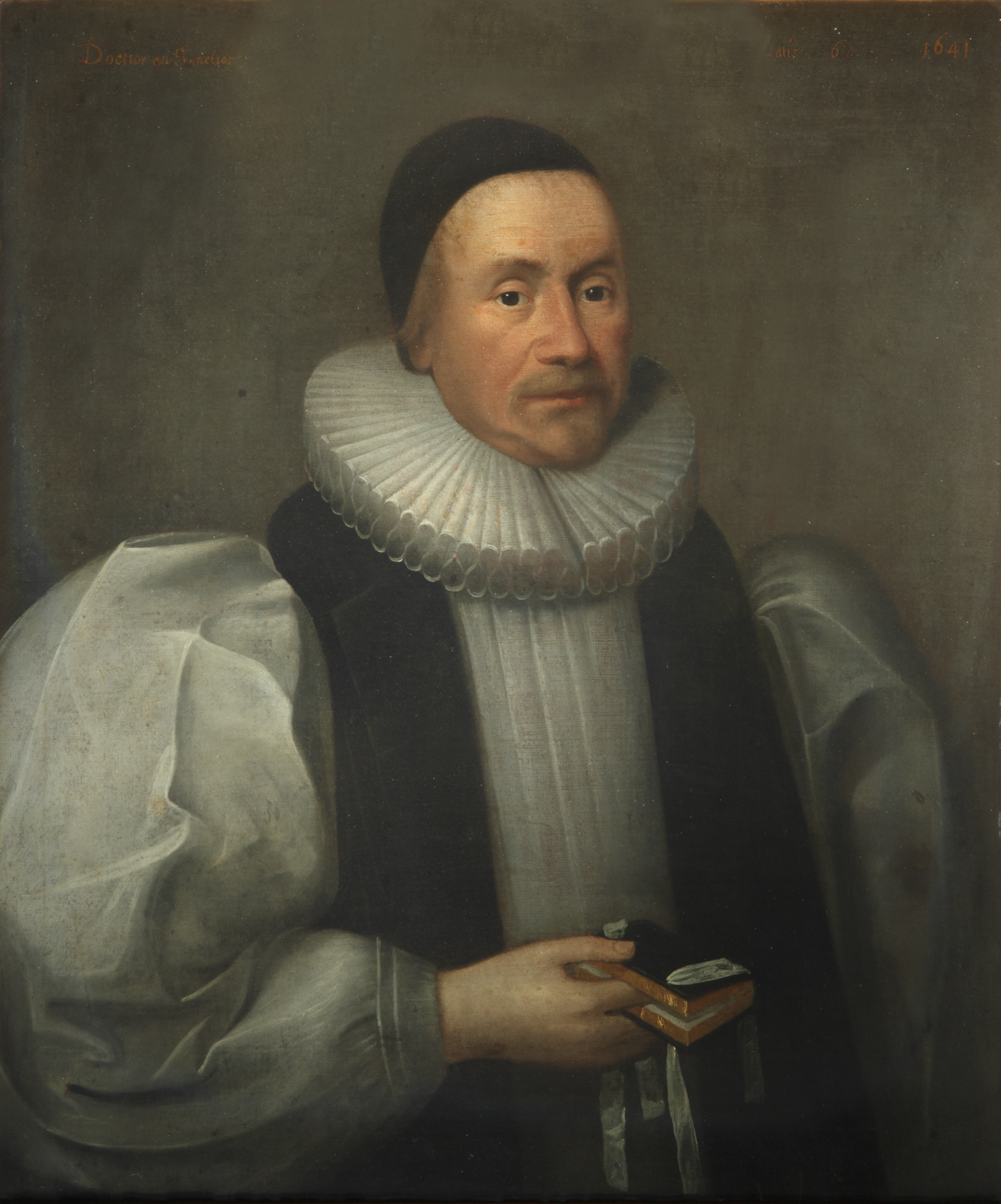
In the years leading up to the Wars of the Three Kingdoms, Ussher's reputation as a scholar and moderate Calvinism meant that his opinion was sought by both King and Parliament

In 1640, Ussher left Ireland for England for what turned out to be the last time. In the years before the Wars of the Three Kingdoms, his reputation as a scholar and his moderate Calvinism meant that his opinion was sought by both King and Parliament. After Ussher lost his home and income through the Irish uprising of 1641, Parliament voted him a pension of £400 while the King awarded him the income and property of the vacant See of Carlisle.

Despite their occasional differences, he remained a loyal friend to Thomas Wentworth, 1st Earl of Strafford, and when the latter was sentenced to death by Parliament, pleaded with the King not to allow the execution of the verdict: unlike some of his episcopal colleagues, he insisted that the King was absolutely bound in conscience by his promise to Strafford that whatever happened his life would be spared. The King did not take his advice, but clearly afterwards regretted not doing so, as is shown by his reference on the scaffold to Strafford's death as "that unjust sentence which I suffered to take effect".

In early 1641, Ussher developed a mediatory position on church government, which sought to bridge the gap between the Laudians, who believed in an episcopalian church hierarchy (bishops), and the Presbyterians, who wanted to abolish episcopacy entirely. His proposals, not published until 1656, after his death, as The Reduction of Episcopacy, proposed a compromise where bishops operated in a Presbyterian synodal system, were initially designed to support a rapprochement between Charles and the parliamentarian leadership in 1641, but were rejected by the King. They did, however, have an afterlife, being published in England and Scotland well into the eighteenth century. In all, he wrote or edited five books relating to episcopacy.

As the middle ground between King and Parliament vanished in 1641–1642, Ussher was forced, reluctantly, to choose between his Calvinist allies in parliament and his instinctive loyalty to the monarchy. Eventually, in January 1642 (having asked parliament's permission), he moved to Oxford, a royalist stronghold. Though Charles severely tested Ussher's loyalty by negotiating with the Catholic Irish, the Primate remained committed to the royal cause, though as the king's fortunes waned, Ussher had to move on to Bristol, Cardiff, and then to St Donat's.

In June 1646, he returned to London under the protection of his friend, Elizabeth, Dowager Countess of Peterborough, in whose houses he stayed from then on. He was deprived of the See of Carlisle by Parliament on 9 October 1646, as the English episcopacy was abolished for the duration of the Commonwealth and the Protectorate. He became a preacher at Lincoln's Inn early in 1647, and despite his royalist loyalties was protected by his friends in Parliament. He watched the execution of Charles I from the roof of the Countess of Peterborough's home in London but fainted before the axe fell.

=== Scholarship on Ignatius ===
Ussher wrote two treatises on the epistles of Ignatius of Antioch while doing his work on church hierarchy. They were scholarly achievements that modern experts largely concur with. In Ussher's time, the only collection of Ignatius's writing easily available was the Long Recension, a set of 16 epistles. Ussher closely examined it and found problems that had gone uncommented on for centuries: differences in tone, theology, and apparent anachronistic references to theological disputes and structures that did not exist during Ignatius's time. Additionally, medieval authors commenting on Ignatius did not appear to be reading the same letters of the Long Recension. Ussher researched and found a shorter set, usually called the Middle Recension, and argued that only the letters contained in it were authentically Ignatius's. The unknown compiler of the Long Recension edited Ignatius's work and included some of his own and seems to have had Arian tendencies. He published this Latin edition of the genuine Ignatian works in 1644. The only major difference between Ussher's stance and modern scholars is that Ussher thought that the Epistle of Ignatius to Polycarp was also inauthentic; most modern scholars believe it to be a genuine production of Ignatius, however.

== Chronology ==
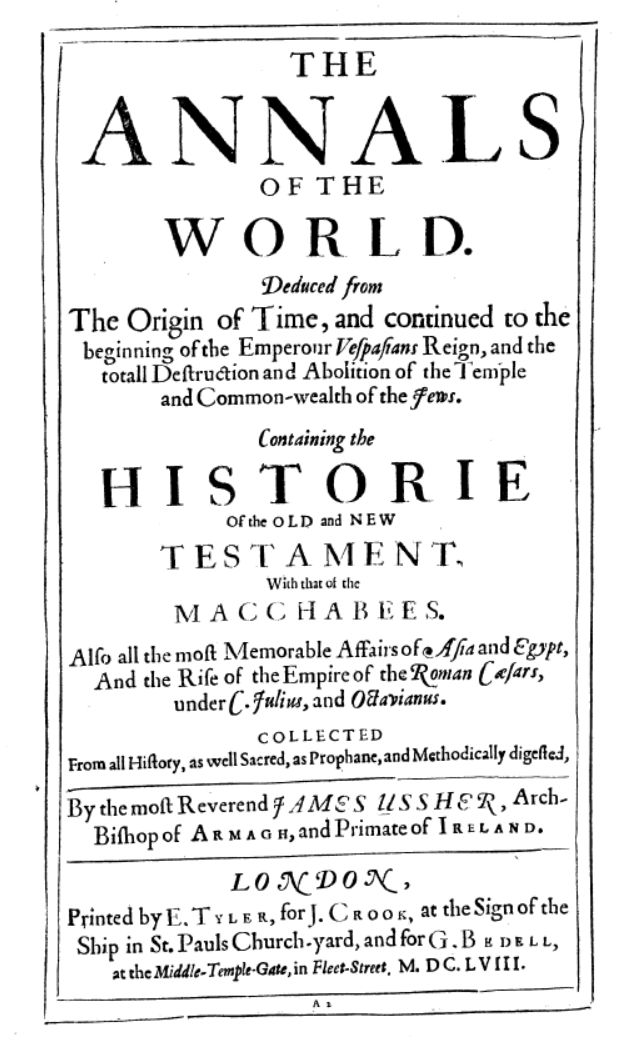
Title page of his Annals of the World

Ussher now concentrated on his research and writing and returned to the study of chronology and the Church Fathers. After a 1647 work on the origin of the Creeds, Ussher published a treatise on the calendar in 1648. This was a warm-up for his most famous work, the Annales veteris testamenti, a prima mundi origine deducti ("Annals of the Old Testament, deduced from the first origins of the world"), which appeared in 1650, and its continuation, Annalium pars posterior, published in 1654. In this work, he calculated the date of the Creation to have been nightfall on 22 October 4004 BC. (Other scholars, such as the Cambridge academic John Lightfoot, calculated their own dates for the Creation.) The time of the Ussher chronology is frequently misquoted as being 9 a.m., noon or 9 p.m. on 23 October. See the related article on the chronology for a discussion of its claims and methodology.

While calculating the date of the Creation is today considered a fringe activity, in Ussher's time, such a calculation was still regarded as an important task, one also attempted by many Post-Reformation scholars, such as Joseph Justus Scaliger and Isaac Newton. Ussher's work is now used to support Young Earth Creationism, which holds that the universe was created thousands of years ago (rather than billions).

Ussher's chronology represented a considerable feat of scholarship: it demanded great depth of learning in what was then known of ancient history, including the rise of the Persians, Greeks and Romans, as well as expertise in the Bible, biblical languages, astronomy, ancient calendars and chronology. Ussher's account of historical events for which he had multiple sources other than the Bible is usually in close agreement with modern accounts – for example, he placed the death of Alexander in 323 BC and that of Julius Caesar in 44 BC. Ussher's last biblical coordinate was the Babylonian king Nebuchadnezzar II, and beyond this point, he had to rely on other considerations. Faced with inconsistent texts of the Torah, each with a different number of years between the Genesis flood narrative and Creation, Ussher chose the Masoretic version, which claims an unbroken history of careful transcription stretching back centuries – but his choice was confirmed for him by the fact that it placed Creation exactly four thousand years before 4 BC, the generally accepted date for the Nativity of Jesus; moreover, he calculated that Solomon's Temple was completed in the year 3000 from creation, so that there were exactly 1,000 years from the temple to Jesus, who was thought to be the 'fulfilment' of the Temple.

== Death ==
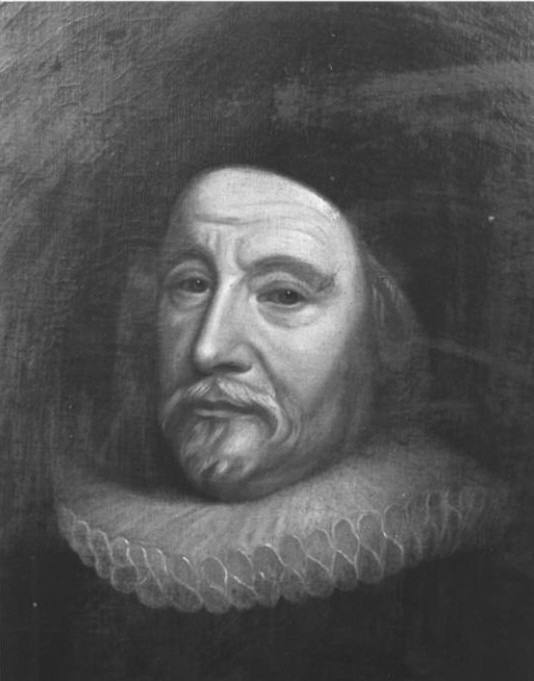
James Ussher's reported last words were "O Lord forgive me, especially my sins of omission"

In 1655, Ussher published his last book, De Graeca Septuaginta Interpretum Versione, the first serious examination of the Septuagint, discussing its accuracy as compared with the Hebrew text of the Old Testament. In 1656, he went to stay in the Countess of Peterborough's house in Reigate, Surrey. On 19 March, he felt a sharp pain in his side after supper and took to his bed. His symptoms seem to have been those of a severe internal haemorrhage. Two days later, he died, aged 75. His last words were reported as: "O Lord, forgive me, especially my sins of omission". His body was embalmed and was to have been buried in Reigate, but at Oliver Cromwell's insistence, he was given a state funeral on 17 April and was buried in the chapel of St Erasmus in Westminster Abbey.

== Works ==
- Elrington, Charles Richard, ed. (1847), The Whole Works of the Most Rev. James Ussher, D.D., vol. I, Dublin: Hodges and Smith – The Life of James Ussher, D.D.
- Elrington, Charles Richard, ed. (1847), The Whole Works of the Most Rev. James Ussher, D.D., vol. II, Dublin: Hodges and Smith – incl. De Christianorum Ecclesiarum Successione et Statu historica Explicatio (1613)
- Elrington, Charles Richard, ed. (1847), The Whole Works of the Most Rev. James Ussher, D.D., vol. III, Dublin: Hodges and Smith – An Answer to a Challenge made by a Jesuit in Ireland
- Elrington, Charles Richard, ed. (1847), The Whole Works of the Most Rev. James Ussher, D.D., vol. IV, Dublin: Hodges and Smith – incl. Gotteschalci et Praedestinatione Controversiae abeomotae Historia (1631); Veterum Epistolarum Hibernicarum Sylloge (1632)
- Elrington, Charles Richard, ed. (1847), The Whole Works of the Most Rev. James Ussher, D.D., vol. V, Dublin: Hodges and Smith – Brittanicarum Ecclesiarum Antiquitates; caput I–XIII (1639)
- Elrington, Charles Richard, ed. (1847), The Whole Works of the Most Rev. James Ussher, D.D., vol. VI, Dublin: Hodges and Smith – Brittanicarum Ecclesiarum Antiquitates; caput XIV–XVII (1639)
- Elrington, Charles Richard, ed. (1864), The Whole Works of the Most Rev. James Ussher, D.D., vol. VII, Dublin: Hodges and Smith – A Geographical and Historical Disquisition, touching the Asia properly so called; The Original of Bishops and Metropolitans briefly laid down; The Judgment of Doctor Rainoldes, touching the Original of Episcopacy, more largely confirmed out of Antiquity; Dissertatio non-de Ignati solum et Polycarpi scriptis, sed etiam de Apostolicis Constitutionibus et Canonibus Clementi Romano attributis (1644); Praefationes in Ignatium (1644); De Romanae Ecclesiae Symbolo vetere aliisque Fidei Formulis tum ab Occidentalibus tum ab Orientalibus in prima Catechesi et Baptismo proponi solitis (1647); De Macedonum et Asianorum Anno Solari Dissertatio (1648); De Graeca Septuaginta Interpretum Versione Syntagma, cum Libri Estherae editione Origenica et vetere Graeca altera; Epistola ad Ludovicum Capellum de variantibus Textus Hebraei Lectionibus; Epistola Gulielmi Eyre ad Usserium
- Elrington, Charles Richard, ed. (1847), The Whole Works of the Most Rev. James Ussher, D.D., vol. VIII, Dublin: Hodges and Smith – Annales veteris Testamenti, a Prima Mundi Origine deducti, una cum Rerum Asiaticarum Aegypticarum Chronico, a temporis historici principio usque ad Maccabaicorum initia producto (1650)
- Elrington, Charles Richard, ed. (1847), The Whole Works of the Most Rev. James Ussher, D.D., vol. IX, Dublin: Hodges and Smith – Annales veteris Testamenti (contd.)
- Elrington, Charles Richard, ed. (1847), The Whole Works of the Most Rev. James Ussher, D.D., vol. X, Dublin: Hodges and Smith – Annales veteris Testamenti (contd.)
- Elrington, Charles Richard, ed. (1847) [(1654], The Whole Works of the Most Rev. James Ussher, D.D., vol. XI, Dublin: Hodges and Smith – Annales veteris Testamenti concludes; Annalium Pars Posterior, in qua, praeter Maccabaicam et novi testamenti historiam, Imperii Romanorum Caesarum sub Caio Julio et Octaviano Ortus, rerumque in Asia et Aegypto Gestarum continetur Chronicon ... (1654)
- Elrington, Charles Richard, ed. (1847), The Whole Works of the Most Rev. James Ussher, D.D., vol. XII, Dublin: Hodges and Smith – Chronologia sacra (1660); Historia Dogmatica Controversiae inter Orthodoxos et Pontificios de Scripturis et Sacris Vernaculis; Dissertatio de Pseudo-Dionysii scriptis; Dissertatio de epistola ad Laodicenses
- Elrington, Charles Richard, ed. (1847), The Whole Works of the Most Rev. James Ussher, D.D., vol. XIII, Dublin: Hodges and Smith – sermons (in English)
- Elrington, Charles Richard, ed. (1847), The Whole Works of the Most Rev. James Ussher, D.D., vol. XIV, Dublin: Hodges and Smith – Tractatus de Controversiis Pontificiis; Praelectiones Theologicae
- Elrington, Charles Richard, ed. (1847), The Whole Works of the Most Rev. James Ussher, D.D., vol. XV, Dublin: Hodges and Smith – letters (in English) (incl. first to Richard Stanihurst, his uncle)
- Elrington, Charles Richard, ed. (1847), The Whole Works of the Most Rev. James Ussher, D.D., vol. XVI, Dublin: Hodges and Smith – letters (in English and Latin)
- Elrington, Charles Richard, ed. (1864), The Whole Works of the Most Rev. James Ussher, D.D., vol. XVII, Dublin: Hodges, Smith, and Co. – indexes

== Arms ==
Coat of arms of James Ussher

Notes
While serving as a bishop Ussher's arms would be displayed impaled with those of the diocese and topped by a mitre.
Escutcheon
Or a chevron Ermine between three batons Azure.

== See also ==
- Dating creation
- Anno Mundi
- Anno Lucis
- Graham Usher (bishop)

Church of England titles
Preceded by Barnaby Potter	Bishop of Carlisle; 1642–1646 in commendam	Succeeded by English Commonwealth (episcopacy abolished), then Richard Sterne
