= Hezekiah Usher =

American bookseller (1616–1676)

- Born: 1616; England
- Died: 14 May 1676 (aged 59–60); Boston, Massachusetts Bay Colony
- Occupation: Bookseller

Hezekiah Usher (1616 – 14 May 1676) was an English merchant in the Massachusetts Bay Colony. He was the first known bookseller in the British Colonies.

== Early life and career ==
Usher was born in England in 1616, likely in Bednall Green. With his brother, Robert, he emigrated to Cambridge, Massachusetts Bay Colony, where he was living (at the corner of Dunster and Winthrop streets) and believed to be running a bookshop out of his home there by 1639.

He appears to have been functioning as both a bookseller and a publisher by 1648. In that year, evidence of his bookselling is to be found on the title page of a book of laws printed by the printing press in Cambridge which "are to be solde at the shop of Hezekiah Usher in Boston." Evidence of his publishing role appears on the title page of a new edition of the Psalms with the imprint "Cambridge: Printed for Hezekiah Usher, of Boston, 1648." Usher appears similarly on several other volumes in the 1650s and later, including what is believed to be the first book in America written for children, John Cotton's Spiritual Milk for Boston Babes (1656).

In the mid-17th century, Usher was a selectman in Boston. He had moved to the city, from across the Charles River, around 1645. He was living on "the north side of King Street, and opposite the Market Place, which was later the site of the Town House, and afterward the Old State House." The bookshop occupied the ground floor of his home.

== Personal life ==
Usher married three times: to Frances, Elizabeth Symmes and Mary Alford. With Frances, he had three sons and two daughters. The sons included Hezekiah Jr. (born in 1639), and John (born in 1648). He had two children with his second wife, who died shortly after their marriage in 1652.

He was a member of Boston's Old South Meetinghouse.

== Death ==
Usher died on 14 May 1676, aged 59 or 60; Hezekiah Jr. followed three years later. Hezekiah Sr. was interred in what became the Francis Tomb in Boston's King's Chapel Burying Ground. His widow, third wife Mary, remarried to Samuel Nowell of Charlestown.
