= Victoria Powers =

American mathematician (1958–2025)

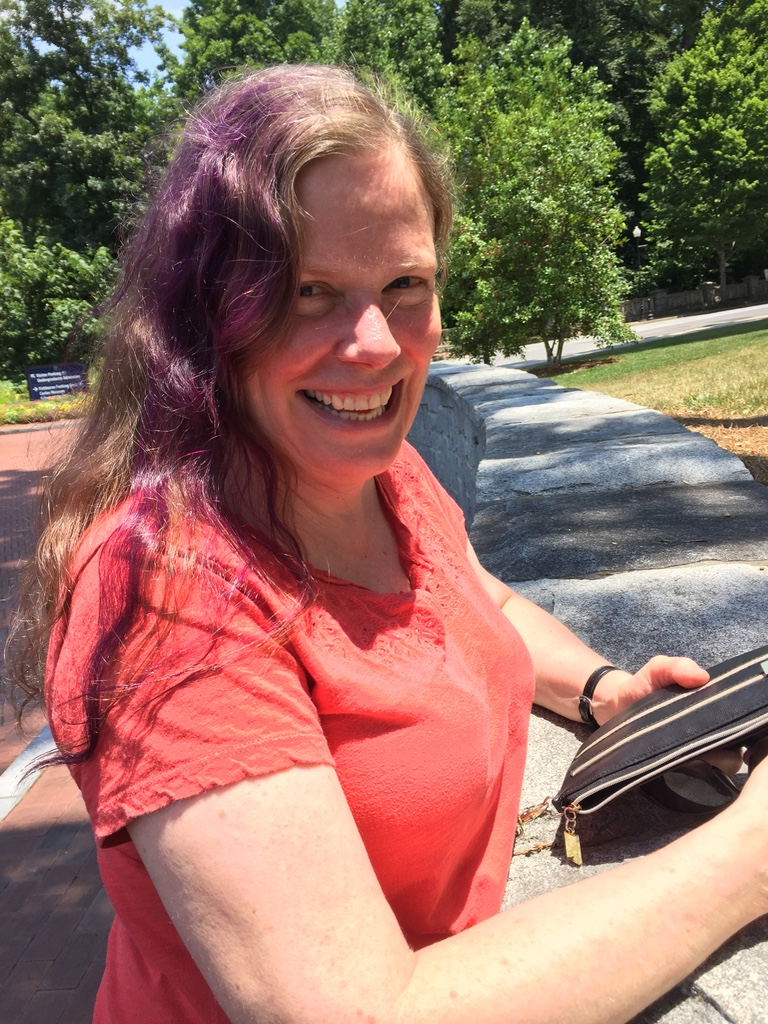
Vicki Powers

Vicki Powers (July 28, 1958 – February 2, 2025), born Victoria Ann Powers, was an American mathematician specializing in algebraic geometry and known for her work on positive polynomials and on the mathematics of electoral systems. She was a professor in the department of mathematics at Emory University, where she worked starting in 1987.

Powers was the author of the book Certificates of Positivity for Real Polynomials—Theory, Practice, and Applications (Springer, 2021). A review on MathSciNet said that "In the reviewer's opinion this is a very nice and concise presentation of the most important pillars of real algebra up to the present time".

== Life and career ==
Powers graduated from the University of Chicago in 1980, with a bachelor's degree in mathematics. She completed her Ph.D. in 1985 at Cornell University. Her dissertation, Finite Constructable Spaces of Signatures, was supervised by Alex F. T. W. Rosenberg.

After completing her doctorate, she joined the faculty at the University of Hawaiʻi, but moved to Emory University only two years later, in 1987.

She was on leave from Emory as a Humboldt Fellow and Alexander von Humboldt research professor at the University of Regensburg in 1991–1992, as a visiting professor at the Complutense University of Madrid in 2002–2003, and as a program officer at the National Science Foundation in 2013–2015. From 2012 to 2014, Powers served as a Council Member at Large for the American Mathematical Society.

Powers' work moved from abstract real algebraic geometry to more concrete questions related to positive polynomials in one and several variables and voting theory. Her collaborators included Bruce Reznick, Eberhard Becker, Mari Castle, Claus Scheiderer and Thorsten Wormann.

Powers was married to Colm Mulcahy, an Irish mathematician who had the same doctoral advisor. On February 2, 2025, she died at home from complications of ALS.

== Selected papers ==
- 1988 "Higher level reduced Witt rings of skew fields", Math Z., vol. 198, no.4, 545–554.
- 1991 "Holomorphy rings and higher level orders on skew fields", J. Algebra, vol. 136, no.1, 51-59.
- 1996 (with Eberhard Becker) "Sums of powers in rings and the real holomorphy ring", J. Reine Angew. Math., vol 480, 71-103.
- 1996 "Hilbert's 17th problem and the champagne problem", Amer. Math. Monthly, vol. 103, no.10, 879-887.
- 1998 (with Thorsten Wormann) "An algorithm for sums of squares of real polynomials", J. Pure Appl. Algebra, vol. 127, no.1, 99-104.
- 2000 (with Bruce Reznick) "Polynomials that are positive on an interval", Trans. Amer. Math. Soc., vol. 352, no. 10, 4677-4692.
- 2000 (with Bruce Reznick) "Notes towards a constructive proof of Hilbert's theorem on ternary quartics", Quadratic forms and their applications (Dublin 1999), Contemp. Math. vol. 272, 209-227.
- 2001 (with Claus Scheiderer) "The moment problem for non-compact semialgebraic sets.", Adv. Geom, vol.1, 71-88
- 2001 (with Bruce Reznick) "A new bound for Polya's theorem with applications to polynomials positive on polyhedra", J. Pure Appl. Algebra, vol.164, no. 1-2, 221-229.
- 2004 (with Bruce Reznick, Claus Scheiderer, and Frank Sottile) "A new approach to Hilbert's theorem on ternary quartics", C. R. Acad. Sci. Paris, vol. 339, no.9, 617-620.
- 2007 (with James Demmel and Jiawang Nie) "Representations of positive polynomials on noncompact semialgebraic sets via KKT ideals." J. Pure Appl. Algebra, vol. 209, no.1, 189-200.
- 2017 "Positive polynomials and sums of squares: theory and practice" Real algebraic geometry, Panor. Syntheses, vol. 51, 155-180.
- 2019 "Power index rankings in bicameral legislatures and the US legislative system., Soc. Choice, Welf. vol. 53, no. 2, 179-196.
- 2024 Chapter "Who's Got the Power? Measuring Power in the US Legislative System" in book Teaching Mathematics through Cross-Curricular Projects, MAA Press, 2024 ISBN 9781470474669

== Awards ==
In May 2024, Powers was the recipient of Emory University's George P. Cuttino Award for mentoring.
