= SOS-convexity =

A multivariate polynomial is SOS-convex (or sum of squares convex) if its Hessian matrix H can be factored as H(x) = S^{T}(x)S(x) where S is a matrix (possibly rectangular) which entries are polynomials in x. In other words, the Hessian matrix is a SOS matrix polynomial.

An equivalent definition is that the form defined as g(x,y) = y^{T}H(x)y is a sum of squares of forms.

== Connection with convexity ==
If a polynomial is SOS-convex, then it is also convex. Since establishing whether a polynomial is SOS-convex amounts to solving a semidefinite programming problem, SOS-convexity can be used as a proxy to establishing if a polynomial is convex. In contrast, deciding if a generic quartic polynomial of degree four (or higher even degree) is convex is a NP-hard problem.

The first counterexample of a polynomial which is convex but not SOS-convex was constructed by Amir Ali Ahmadi and Pablo Parrilo in 2009. The polynomial is a homogeneous polynomial that is sum-of-squares and given by:

$$p(x)= 32 x_{1}^{8}+118 x_{1}^{6} x_{2}^{2}+40 x_{1}^{6} x_{3}^{2}+25 x_{1}^{4} x_{2}^{4}
-43 x_{1}^{4} x_{2}^{2} x_{3}^{2}-35 x_{1}^{4} x_{3}^{4}+3 x_{1}^{2} x_{2}^{4} x_{3}^{2}
-16 x_{1}^{2} x_{2}^{2} x_{3}^{4}+24 x_{1}^{2} x_{3}^{6}+16 x_{2}^{8}
+44 x_{2}^{6} x_{3}^{2}+70 x_{2}^{4} x_{3}^{4}+60 x_{2}^{2} x_{3}^{6}+30 x_{3}^{8}$$

In the same year, Grigoriy Blekherman proved in a non-constructive manner that there exist convex forms that is not representable as sum of squares. An explicit example of a convex form (with degree 4 and 272 variables) that is not a sum of squares was claimed by James Saunderson in 2021.

== Connection with non-negativity and sum-of-squares ==
In 2013 Amir Ali Ahmadi and Pablo Parrilo showed that every convex homogeneous polynomial in n variables and degree 2d is SOS-convex if and only if either (a) n = 2 or (b) 2d = 2 or (c) n = 3 and 2d = 4. Impressively, the same relation is valid for non-negative homogeneous polynomial in n variables and degree 2d that can be represented as sum of squares polynomials (See Hilbert's seventeenth problem).

== See also ==
- Hilbert's seventeenth problem
- Polynomial SOS
- Sum-of-squares optimization
