= Multiscale turbulence =

Class of turbulent flow

Multiscale turbulence is a class of turbulent flows in which the chaotic motion of the fluid is forced at different length and/or time scales. This is usually achieved by immersing in a moving fluid a body with a multiscale, often fractal-like, arrangement of length scales. This arrangement of scales can be either passive or active

Three examples of multiscale turbulence generators. From left to right, a fractal cross grid, a fractal square grid and a fractal I grid. See on YouTube the manufacturing of a fractal grid.

As turbulent flows contain eddies with a wide range of scales, exciting the turbulence at particular scales (or range of scales) allows one to fine-tune the properties of that flow. Multiscale turbulent flows have been successfully applied in different fields., such as:

- Reducing acoustic noise from wings by modifying the geometry of spoilers;
- Enhancing heat transfer from impinging jets passing through grids;
- Reducing the vortex shedding intensity of flows past normal plates without changing the shedding frequency;
- Enhancing mixing by energy-efficient stirring;
- Improving flow metering and flow conditioning in pipes;
- Improving combustion.

Multiscale turbulence has also played an important role into probing the internal structure of turbulence. This sort of turbulence allowed researchers to unveil a novel dissipation law in which the parameter $C_\epsilon$ in

$$\varepsilon = C_\varepsilon \frac{\mathcal{U}^3}{\mathcal{L}}$$

is not constant, as required by the Richardson-Kolmogorov energy cascade. This new law can be expressed as $C_\epsilon \propto \frac{Re_I^m}{Re_L^n}$, with $m \approx 1 \approx n$, where $Re_I$ and $Re_L$ are Reynolds numbers based, respectively, on initial/global conditions (such as free-stream velocity and the object's length scale) and local conditions (such as the rms velocity and integral length scale). This new dissipation law characterises non-equilibrium turbulence apparently universally in various flows (not just multiscale turbulence) and results from non-equilibrium unsteady energy cascade. This imbalance implies that new mean flow scalings exist for free shear turbulent flows, as already observed in axisymmetric wakes
