= Lewis Fry Richardson =

English meteorologist and mathematician (1881–1953)

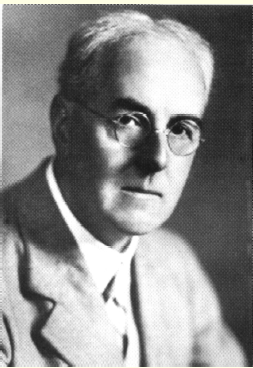
- Lewis Fry Richardson D.Sc., FRS
- Born: 11 October 1881; Newcastle upon Tyne, England
- Died: 30 September 1953 (aged 71); Kilmun, Argyll and Bute, Scotland
- Citizenship: United Kingdom
- Education: Bootham School; Durham College of Science; King's College, Cambridge
- Known for: Fractals; Conflict modelling Richardson extrapolation Richardson number Superdifussion
- Awards: Fellow of the Royal Society
- Scientific career
- Fields: mathematician physicist meteorologist psychologist
- Workplaces: National Physical Laboratory; National Peat Industries; University College Aberystwyth; Meteorological Office; Paisley Technical College

Lewis Fry Richardson, FRS (11 October 1881 – 30 September 1953) was an English mathematician, physicist, meteorologist, psychologist, and pacifist who pioneered modern mathematical techniques of weather forecasting, and the application of similar techniques to studying the causes of wars and how to prevent them.

Richardson is also noted for his pioneering work on fractals and a method for solving a system of linear equations known as modified Richardson iteration.

== Early life ==
Lewis Fry Richardson was the youngest of seven children born to Catherine Fry (1838–1919) and David Richardson (1835–1913). They were a prosperous Quaker family, David Richardson operating a successful tanning and leather-manufacturing business.

At age 12 he was sent to a Quaker boarding school, Bootham School in York, where he received an education in science, which stimulated an active interest in natural history. In 1898 he went on to Durham College of Science (a college of Durham University) where he took courses in mathematical physics, chemistry, botany, and zoology. He proceeded in 1900 to King's College, Cambridge, where he was taught physics in the natural sciences tripos by (among others) J. J. Thomson and graduated with a first-class degree in 1903. At age 47 he received a doctorate in mathematical psychology from the University of London.

== Career ==
Richardson's working life represented his eclectic interests:

- National Physical Laboratory (1903–1904).
- University College Aberystwyth (1905–1906).
- Chemist, National Peat Industries (1906–1907).
- National Physical Laboratory (1907–1909).
- Manager of the physical and chemical laboratory, Sunbeam Lamp Company (1909–1912).
- Manchester College of Technology (1912–1913).
- Meteorological Office – as superintendent of Eskdalemuir Observatory (1913–1916).
- Friends Ambulance Unit in France (1916–1919).
- Meteorological Office at Benson, Oxfordshire (1919–1920).
- Head of the Physics Department at Westminster Training College (1920–1929).
- Principal, Paisley Technical College, now part of the University of the West of Scotland (1929–1940).

In 1926, he was elected to the Fellowship of the Royal Society.

== Pacifism ==
Richardson's Quaker beliefs entailed an ardent pacifism that exempted him from military service during World War I as a conscientious objector, though this subsequently disqualified him from having any academic post. Richardson worked from 1916 to 1919 for the Friends' Ambulance Unit attached to the 16th French Infantry Division. After the war, he rejoined the Meteorological Office but was compelled to resign on grounds of conscience when it was amalgamated into the Air Ministry in 1920. He subsequently pursued a career on the fringes of the academic world before retiring in 1940 to research his own ideas. His pacifism influenced his research interests. According to Thomas Körner, the discovery that his meteorological work was of value to chemical weapons designers caused him to abandon his efforts in this field and destroy findings he had not yet published.

== Weather forecasting ==
Richardson's interest in meteorology led him to propose a scheme for weather forecasting by solution of differential equations, the method used nowadays, though when he published Weather Prediction by Numerical Process in 1922, suitable fast computing was unavailable. He described his ideas thus:

After so much hard reasoning, may one play with a fantasy? Imagine a large hall like a theatre, except that the circles and galleries go right round through the space usually occupied by the stage. The walls of this chamber are painted to form a map of the globe. The ceiling represents the north polar regions, England is in the gallery, the tropics in the upper circle, Australia on the dress circle and the Antarctic in the pit.

A myriad computers [people who compute] are at work upon the weather of the part of the map where each sits, but each computer attends only to one equation or part of an equation. The work of each region is coordinated by an official of higher rank. Numerous little "night signs" display the instantaneous values so that neighbouring computers can read them. Each number is thus displayed in three adjacent zones so as to maintain communication to the North and South on the map.

From the floor of the pit a tall pillar rises to half the height of the hall. It carries a large pulpit on its top. In this sits the man in charge of the whole theatre; he is surrounded by several assistants and messengers. One of his duties is to maintain a uniform speed of progress in all parts of the globe. In this respect he is like the conductor of an orchestra in which the instruments are slide-rules and calculating machines. But instead of waving a baton he turns a beam of rosy light upon any region that is running ahead of the rest, and a beam of blue light upon those who are behindhand.

Four senior clerks in the central pulpit are collecting the future weather as fast as it is being computed, and despatching it by pneumatic carrier to a quiet room. There it will be coded and telephoned to the radio transmitting station. Messengers carry piles of used computing forms down to a storehouse in the cellar.

In a neighbouring building there is a research department, where they invent improvements. But there is much experimenting on a small scale before any change is made in the complex routine of the computing theatre. In a basement an enthusiast is observing eddies in the liquid lining of a huge spinning bowl, but so far the arithmetic proves the better way. In another building are all the usual financial, correspondence and administrative offices. Outside are playing fields, houses, mountains and lakes, for it was thought that those who compute the weather should breathe of it freely. (Richardson 1922)

In 1950, when Richardson received news of the first weather forecast by the first modern computer, ENIAC, he called it an "enormous scientific advance". The first calculations for a 24-hour forecast took ENIAC nearly 24 hours to produce.

Richardson was also interested in atmospheric turbulence and performed many terrestrial experiments. The Richardson number, a dimensionless parameter of the theory of turbulence, is named for him. He famously summarised turbulence in rhyming verse in Weather Prediction by Numerical Process (p 66):

Big whirls have little whirls that feed on their velocity,

and little whirls have lesser whirls and so on to viscosity.

[A play on two lines of Augustus De Morgan's poem Siphonaptera: "Great fleas have little fleas upon their backs to bite 'em, / And little fleas have lesser fleas, and so ad infinitum." (A Budget of Paradoxes, 1915). De Morgan's lines themselves reword two lines of Jonathan Swift's 1733 satirical poem "On Poetry: A Rapsody".]

=== Richardson's attempt at numerical forecast ===
One of Richardson's most celebrated achievements is his retroactive attempt to forecast the weather during a single day—20 May 1910—by direct computation. At the time, meteorologists made forecasts principally by looking for similar weather patterns from records and extrapolating. Richardson attempted to use a mathematical model of the principal features of the atmosphere, and use data taken at a specific time (7 AM) to calculate the weather six hours later ab initio. As meteorologist Peter Lynch makes clear, Richardson's forecast failed dramatically, predicting a huge 145 hectopascals (4.3 inHg) rise in pressure over six hours when the pressure actually was more or less static. But detailed analysis by Lynch has shown that the cause was a failure to apply smoothing techniques to the data, which rule out unphysical surges in pressure. When these are applied, Richardson's forecast is essentially accurate—a remarkable achievement considering the calculations were done by hand while Richardson was serving with the Quaker ambulance unit in France.

== Mathematical analysis of war ==
Richardson also applied his mathematical skills in service of his pacifist principles, in particular in understanding the basis of international conflict. For this reason, he is now considered the initiator, or co-initiator (with Quincy Wright and Pitirim Sorokin as well as others such as Kenneth Boulding, Anatol Rapaport and Adam Curle), of the scientific analysis of conflict—an interdisciplinary topic of quantitative and mathematical social science dedicated to systematic investigation of the causes of war and conditions of peace. As he had done with weather, he analysed war using mainly differential equations and probability theory. Considering the armament of two nations, Richardson posited an idealised system of equations whereby the rate of a nation's armament buildup is directly proportional to the amount of arms its rival has and also to the grievances felt toward the rival, and inversely proportional to the amount of arms it already has. Solutions of this system of equations yield insightful conclusions about the nature, and the stability or instability, of various hypothetical conditions that might obtain between nations.

Richardson also originated the theory that the propensity for war between two nations is a function of the length of their common border. And in Arms and Insecurity (1949), and Statistics of Deadly Quarrels (1960), he sought to analyse the causes of war statistically. Factors he assessed included economics, language, and religion. In the preface of the latter, he wrote: "There is in the world a great deal of brilliant, witty political discussion which leads to no settled convictions. My aim has been different: namely to examine a few notions by quantitative techniques in the hope of reaching a reliable answer."

In Statistics of Deadly Quarrels Richardson presented data on virtually every war from 1815 to 1950, which he categorized using a base 10 logarithmic scale based on the number of battle deaths a conflict produced. In this way, he was the first to observe that the sizes of wars appeared to follow a highly right-skewed Pareto distribution, in which while small conflicts are relatively common, the very largest conflicts are orders of magnitude larger than the "typical" conflict. While conflicts' sizes can be predicted ahead of time, Richardson showed that the number of international wars per year follows a Poisson distribution. On a smaller scale he showed a similar pattern for gang murders in Chicago and Shanghai, and hypothesized that a universal rule connected the frequency and the size of all "deadly quarrels".

In the early 21st century, Richardson's work on conflict enjoyed a revival among conflict scholars, as his power-law distribution pattern was found in the statistics of several other kinds of conflict, including terrorism and violent mobs, and his work has informed the debate over the durability of the "Long Peace" since 1946. Modern statisticians have shown that while Richardson's analyses were not rigorous by modern standards, his statistical conclusions largely hold up: the sizes and frequencies of armed conflicts plausibly follow a power-law pattern, and the rate of new wars is well-modeled by a Poisson distribution.

== Research on the length of coastlines and borders ==
Richardson searched for a relation between the probability of two countries going to war and the length of their common border. While collecting data, he found that there was considerable variation in the various published lengths of international borders. For example, that between Spain and Portugal was variously quoted as 987 or 1,214 km, and that between the Netherlands and Belgium as 380 or 449 km.

The reason for these inconsistencies is the "coastline paradox". Suppose the coast of Britain is measured using a 200–km ruler, specifying that both ends of the ruler must touch the coast. Now cut the ruler in half and repeat the measurement, then repeat:

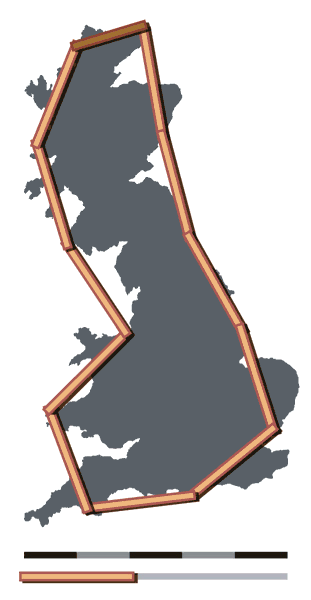
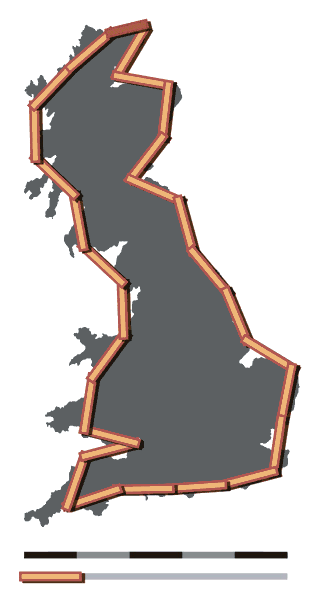
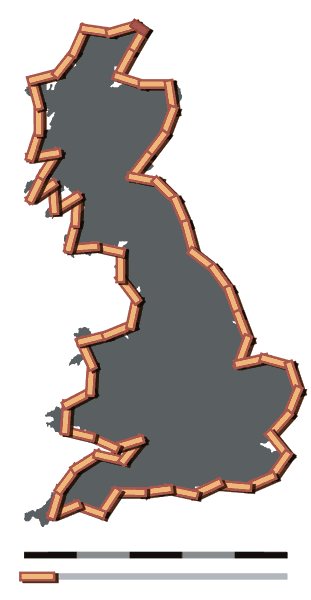

The smaller the ruler, the longer the resulting coastline. It might be supposed that these values would converge to a number representing the coastline's true length, but Richardson demonstrated that this is not so: the measured length of coastlines, and other natural features, increases without limit as the unit of measurement is made smaller. This is known as the Richardson effect.

At the time, the scientific community ignored Richardson's research. Today it is considered an element of the beginning of the modern study of fractals. Benoît Mandelbrot quotes Richardson's research in his 1967 paper How Long Is the Coast of Britain? Richardson identified a value (between 1 and 2) that describes the changes (with increasing measurement detail) in observed complexity for a particular coastline; this value served as a model for the concept of fractal dimension.

== Patents for detection of icebergs ==
In April 1912, soon after the loss of the ship Titanic, Richardson registered a patent for iceberg detection using acoustic echolocation in air. A month later he registered a similar patent for acoustic echolocation in water, anticipating the invention of sonar by Paul Langevin and Robert Boyle 6 years later.

== Personal life ==
In 1909, Richardson married Dorothy Garnett, daughter of the mathematician and physicist William Garnett. They were unable to have children due to an incompatibility of blood types, but adopted two sons and a daughter between 1920 and 1927.

Richardson's nephew Ralph Richardson became a noted actor. His great-nephew (through his wife Dorothy's eldest brother, James Clerk Maxwell Garnett), Julian Hunt, became a meteorologist and director general and chief executive of the British Meteorological Office from 1992 to 1997. A great-niece of the same line of descent is the former politician Virginia Bottomley, now Baroness Bottomley.

== Legacy ==
Since 1997, the Lewis Fry Richardson Medal has been awarded by the European Geosciences Union for "exceptional contributions to nonlinear geophysics in general" (by EGS until 2003 and by EGU since 2004).

Winners have been:

- 2025: Vincenzo Carbone
- 2024: Annick Pouquet
- 2023: Angelo Vulpiani
- 2022: Ulrike Feudel
- 2021: Bérengère Dubrulle
- 2020: Valerio Lucarini
- 2019: Shaun Lovejoy
- 2018: Timothy N. Palmer
- 2017: Edward Ott
- 2016: Peter L. Read
- 2015: Daniel Schertzer
- 2014: Olivier Talagrand
- 2013: Jürgen Kurths
- 2012: Harry Swinney
- 2011: Catherine Nicolis
- 2010: Klaus Fraedrich
- 2009: Stéphan Fauve
- 2008: Akiva Yaglom
- 2007: Ulrich Schumann
- 2006: Roberto Benzi
- 2005: Henk A. Dijkstra
- 2004: Michael Ghil
- 2003: Uriel Frisch
- 2002: Friedrich Hermann Busse
- 2001: Julian Hunt
- 2000: Benoit Mandelbrot
- 1999: Raymond Hide
- 1998: Vladimir Keilis-Borok

Since 1959, there has been a Peace Studies centre at Lancaster University, the Richardson Institute, which carries out interdisciplinary research on peace and conflict in Richardson's spirit.

== In popular culture ==
- A fictional version of Richardson, named Wallace Ryman, plays a pivotal role in Giles Foden's novel Turbulence.
- Richardson is mentioned in John Brunner's science fiction novel Stand on Zanzibar, where Statistics of Deadly Quarrels is used as an argument that wars are inevitable.
- Richardson's work is mentioned in Poul Anderson's speculative fiction novelette Kings Who Die.
- Richardson is mentioned in Charlie Kaufman's 2020 novel Antkind.
- Richardson's couplet "Big whirls have little whirls that feed on their velocity; little whirls have lesser whirls & so on to viscosity" is mentioned in Lupe Fiasco's song "Dots & Lines".

== See also ==
- Anomalous diffusion
- Arms race
- Coastline paradox
- Energy cascade
- War cycles
- Magnetic helicity
- Richardson extrapolation
- Richardson number
- Modified Richardson iteration
- Richards equation
- Multiscale turbulence
- Takebe Kenko
- Frederick W. Lanchester
- List of peace activists
