= Alex F. T. W. Rosenberg =

German-American mathematician (1926–2007)

- Born: December 5, 1926; Berlin, Prussia
- Died: October 27, 2007 (aged 80); Schwerte, North Rhine-Westphalia
- Education: University of Chicago
- Known for: Hochschild–Kostant–Rosenberg theorem
- Scientific career
- Fields: abstract algebra Homology; Galois theory quadratic forms
- Workplaces: Northwestern University; Cornell University; University of California, Santa Barbara
- Doctoral advisor: Irving Kaplansky
- Doctoral students: Colm Mulcahy; Vera Pless; Victoria Powers

Alex F. T. W. Rosenberg (1926–2007) was a German-American mathematician who served as the editor of the Proceedings of the American Mathematical Society from 1960 to 1965, and of The American Mathematical Monthly from 1974 to 1976.

He should not be confused with Alexander L. (Sasha) Rosenberg, a Russian-American mathematician at Kansas State University.

== Education ==
Rosenberg was born on December 5, 1926, in Berlin. His family escaped Nazi Germany in 1939, moving to Switzerland, to England, and then to Ontario, Canada. Rosenberg graduated in 1948 from the University of Toronto, with a B.A. in mathematics, and earned a master's degree there the following year. He completed his PhD in 1951 at the University of Chicago, with a doctoral thesis on ring theory supervised by Irving Kaplansky.

== Career ==
After postdoctoral studies at the University of Michigan, Rosenberg taught at Northwestern University from 1952 to 1961, becoming a US citizen in 1959. His students at Northwestern included Vera Pless, later to be known for her work in combinatorics and coding theory.

He moved to Cornell University in 1961, and served as department chair there from 1966 to 1969 where his PhD students included Vera Pless, Lindsay Childs and David Dobbs. In 1986 he moved again, to become chair of the mathematics department at the University of California, Santa Barbara. He was named emeritus at Cornell in 1988, and retired from UCSB in 1994.

== Research ==
Rosenberg's research was in the area of abstract algebra, including the application of homology to Galois theory and to the theory of quadratic forms working with Eberhard Becker and others.

With Gerhard Hochschild and Bertram Kostant, he is one of the namesakes of the Hochschild–Kostant–Rosenberg theorem, which they published in 1962 and which describes the Hochschild homology of some algebras.

== Personal life ==
Rosenberg married Beatrice F. Gershenson in 1952, with whom he had two sons. They divorced in 1984, and he married his second wife Brunhilde in Germany in 1985 and whose son, Daniel, he subsequently adopted. He died on October 27, 2007, in Schwerte, Germany.
