= Taylor microscale =

Length scale at which eddy currents are significantly affected by viscosity

In fluid dynamics, the Taylor microscale, which is sometimes called the turbulence length scale, is a length scale used to characterize a turbulent fluid flow. This microscale is named after Geoffrey Ingram Taylor. The Taylor microscale is the intermediate length scale at which fluid viscosity significantly affects the dynamics of turbulent eddies in the flow. This length scale is traditionally applied to turbulent flow which can be characterized by a Kolmogorov spectrum of velocity fluctuations. In such a flow, length scales which are larger than the Taylor microscale are not strongly affected by viscosity. These larger length scales in the flow are generally referred to as the inertial range. Below the Taylor microscale the turbulent motions are subject to strong viscous forces and kinetic energy is dissipated into heat. These shorter length scale motions are generally termed the dissipation range.

Calculation of the Taylor microscale is not entirely straightforward, requiring formation of certain flow correlation function(s), then expanding in a Taylor series and using the first non-zero term to characterize an osculating parabola. The Taylor microscale is proportional to $\text{Re}^{-1/2}$, while the Kolmogorov microscale is proportional to $\text{Re}^{-3/4}$, where $\text{Re}$ is the integral scale Reynolds number. A turbulence Reynolds number calculated based on the Taylor microscale $\lambda$ is given by

$$\text{Re}_\lambda = \frac{\langle \mathbf{v'} \rangle_{rms} \lambda}{\nu},$$

where $\langle \mathbf{v'} \rangle_{rms} = \frac{1}{\sqrt{3}} \sqrt{ (v'_1)^2 + (v'_2)^2 + (v'_3)^2 }$ is the root mean square of the velocity fluctuations. The Taylor microscale is given as

$$\lambda = \sqrt{15 \frac{\nu}{\epsilon}} \langle \mathbf{v'} \rangle_{rms},$$

where $\nu$ is the kinematic viscosity, and $\epsilon$ is the rate of energy dissipation. A relation with turbulence kinetic energy $k$ can be derived as

$$\lambda \approx \sqrt{10 \nu \frac{k}{\epsilon}}.$$

The Taylor microscale gives a convenient estimation for the fluctuating strain rate field

$$\left( \frac{\partial \langle \mathbf{v} '\rangle_{rms}}{\partial \mathbf{x} }\right)^2 = \frac{\langle \mathbf{v}' \rangle_{rms}^2}{\lambda^2}.$$

== Other relations ==
The Taylor microscale falls in between the large-scale eddies and the small-scale eddies, which can be seen by calculating the ratios between $\lambda$ and the Kolmogorov microscale $\eta$. Given the length scale of the larger eddies $l \propto \frac{k^{3/2}}{\epsilon}$, and the turbulence Reynolds number $\text{Re}_{l}$ referred to these eddies, the following relations can be obtained:

$$\frac{\lambda}{l} = \sqrt{10} \, \text{Re}_{l}^{-1/2}$$

$$\frac{\eta}{l} = \text{Re}_{l}^{-3/4}$$

$$\frac{\lambda}{\eta} = \sqrt{10} \, \text{Re}_{l}^{1/4}$$

$$\lambda = \sqrt{10} \, \eta^{2/3} l^{1/3}$$
