= Eberhard Becker =

German mathematician (born 1943)

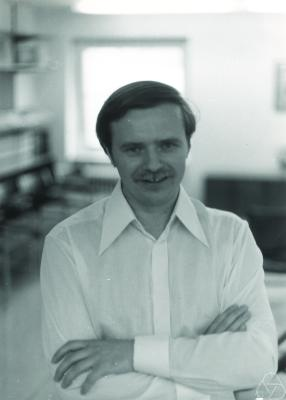
- Becker in 1976
- Born: July 23, 1943; Stavenhagen

Academic background
- Education: University of Hamburg
- Website: Prof. em. Dr. Eberhard Becker

Eberhard Becker (born July 23, 1943, in Stavenhagen) is a German mathematician whose career was spent at the University of Dortmund. A very active researcher in algebra, he later became rector of the university there. During his term as rector, it was renamed the Technical University of Dortmund.

== Education and career ==
Becker received his Ph.D. at the University of Hamburg in 1972 with the dissertation, "Contributions to the theory of semi-simple quadratic algebra" under advisor Hel Braun. He completed his habilitation at the University of Cologne in 1976. In 1979 Becker was appointed to the mathematics department at the University of Dortmund.

His research included work in the algebraic theory of quadratic forms and real algebraic geometry. His collaborators included Manfred Knebusch and Alex F. T. W. Rosenberg. He supervised over a dozen doctoral students, including Markus Schweighofer, Susanne Pumplün, and Thorsten Wörmann.

In the mid 1980s, Becker proved that the expression (1 + $t^2$)/(2 + $t^2$) was a sum of 4th powers, 6th powers, 8th powers and so on. He offered a bottle of champaign to anyone who could find explicit representations of this form. Bruce Reznick came up with a solution in 1994.

After working as institute director, dean and member of the Senate at the University of Dortmund, Becker became rector there on April 30, 2002 following the resignation of Hans-Jürgen Klein. During his term in office the Senate decided, at his request, to change the name from “University of Dortmund” to “Technical University of Dortmund”. This decision was not without controversy, particularly in the humanities departments, but was confirmed at the crucial Senate meeting by two-thirds of the vote. On September 1, 2008 he was replaced by Ursula Gather.

On the occasion of his retirement on November 7, 2008, the faculty organized a celebratory colloquium for him. To mark his 80th birthday, a conference on Quadratic Forms and Real Algebra was held in October 2023 at the University of Dortmund.
