= Peter Lynch (meteorologist) =

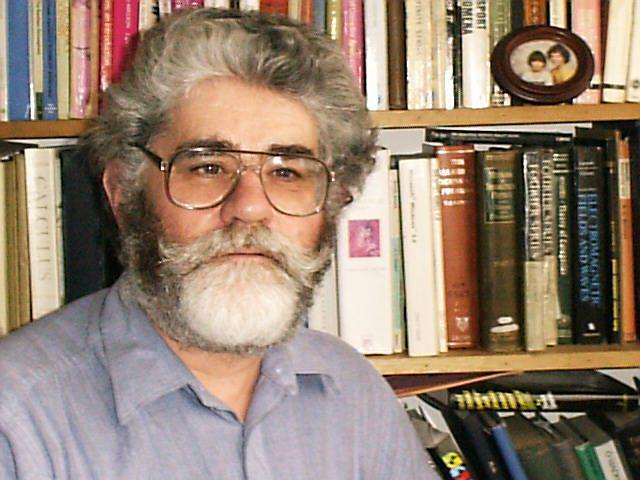
- Born: 1947
- Education: University College Dublin
- Occupations: Meteorologist university teacher author
- Employer(s): Met Éireann (1971–2004); University College Dublin (2004–)
- Website: https://maths.ucd.ie/~plynch/

Peter Lynch is an Irish meteorologist, mathematician, blogger and book author. His interests include numerical weather prediction, dynamic meteorology, Hamiltonian mechanics, the history of meteorology, and the popularisation of mathematics.

== Life and career ==
Lynch was born in Dublin, and educated at University College Dublin, where he obtained his BSc (1968) and MSc (1969) in mathematical science. He enlisted in the Irish meteorological service (now known as Met Éireann) in 1971, and worked there until 2004, rising to the rank of Head of the Research and Training Division and later Deputy Director. In 1982, he was awarded a PhD by Trinity College Dublin for his thesis Planetary-scale Hydrodynamic Instability in the Atmosphere with Ray Bates as a primary supervisor and Larry Crane as a secondary supervisor. He became an honorary part-time lecturer in the School of Mathematics in Trinity College Dublin in 1990, a position he still holds in 2024.

In 2004, he moved to academia, becoming Met Éireann Professor of Meteorology at the School of Mathematical Sciences, University College Dublin. He has supervised several doctoral theses there. He is now an Emeritus Professor at the School of Mathematical Sciences.

Shortly after formally retiring from UCD in 2011, he started writing a weekly mathematical blog called "That's Maths", about half of the articles also appearing in The Irish Times newspaper. Three books of collected columns have resulted, in 2016, 2020, and 2022.

== Scientific meteorology ==
One of Lynch's principal interests is the scientific approach to weather forecasting and its history, for example publishing a 2000 paper called "Weather Forecasting: from woolly art to solid science". Lewis Fry Richardson pioneered mathematical techniques of weather forecasting and dreamed that weather prediction would one day be an exact science. Modern computers were not available in Richardson's day and further theoretical advances were needed before Richardson's dream could be a realised. Lynch examined this issue first in a 2008 paper, and later in his book The Emergence of Numerical Weather Prediction: Richardson's Dream.

== Awards ==
In 2014 Lynch received the European Meteorological Society Silver Medal for "his outstanding contribution to meteorological education and outreach activities, his important scientific contribution to Numerical Weather forecasting and his leadership in international collaborations." In 2017 he received the Maths Week Ireland award for outstanding work in raising public awareness of mathematics.

In 2012, Peter Lynch was elected to membership of the Royal Irish Academy. He is also a Fellow of the Institute of Physics and a Fellow of the Institute of Mathematics and its Applications.

== Publications ==
Books

- 2022: That's Maths III : Elegant Abstractions & Eclectic Applications Logic Press, xii+260 pp. ISBN 978-1-4717-5752-5
- 2020: That’s Maths II (subtitled “A Ton of Wonders”) Logic Press,, ISBN 9781716507991
- 2016: That’s Maths (subtitled “The Mathematical Magic in Everyday Life”) Gill Books, ISBN 9780717169559
- 2010: Rambling Round Ireland: A Commodius Vicus of Recirculation The Liffey Press, ISBN 1905785917
- 2006: The Emergence of Numerical Weather Prediction: Richardson's Dream, Cambridge University Press, ISBN 9780521857291

Papers

- 2016: Lynch, Peter (2 June 2016). "In Retrospect: Replication of Foucault's pendulum experiment in Dublin". Proceedings of the Royal Irish Academy: Archaeology, Culture, History, Literature. 116C: 297–311. doi:10.3318/PRIAC.2016.116.03. JSTOR 10.3318/priac.2016.116.03.
- 2015: "Numerical Weather Prediction", In Princeton Companion to Applied Mathematics, Ed. N. J. Higham et al., Princeton Univ. Press, ISBN 9-780-691-15039-0.
- 2009: Lynch, Peter (1 April 2009). "On resonant Rossby—Haurwitz triads". Tellus A. 61 (3): 438–445. doi:10.1111/j.1600-0870.2008.00395.x (inactive 1 July 2025).
- 2008: Lynch, Peter (20 March 2008). "The origins of computer weather prediction and climate modeling". Journal of Computational Physics. 227 (7): 3431–3444. Bibcode:2008JCoPh.227.3431L. doi:10.1016/j.jcp.2007.02.034.
- 2004: Lynch, Peter; Houghton, Conor (15 March 2004). "Pulsation and precession of the resonant swinging spring". Physica D. 190 (1–2): 38–62. arXiv:nlin/0303038. Bibcode:2004PhyD..190...38L. doi:10.1016/j.physd.2003.09.043. hdl:2262/22139.
- 1997: Joly, Alain; Jorgensen, Dave; Shapiro, Melvyn A.; Thorpe, Alan; Bessemoulin, Pierre; Browning, Keith A.; Cammas, Jean-Pierre; Chalon, Jean-Pierre; Clough, Sidney A.; Emanuel, Kerry A.; Eymard, Laurence; Gall, Robert; Hildebrand, Peter H.; Langland, Rolf H.; Lemaître, Yvon; Lynch, Peter; Moore, James A.; Persson, P. Ola G.; et al. (1 September 1997). "The Fronts and Atlantic Storm-Track Experiment (FASTEX): Scientific Objectives and Experimental Design". Bulletin of the American Meteorological Society. 78 (9): 1917–1940. Bibcode:1997BAMS...78.1917J. doi:10.1175/1520-0477(1997)078<1917:TFAAST>2.0.CO;2.
- 1997: Lynch, Peter (1 April 1997). "The Dolph-Chebyshev window: A simple optimal filter". Monthly Weather Review. 125 (4): 655–660. doi:10.1175/1520-0493(1997)125<0655:TDCWAS>2.0.CO;2.
- 1992: Lynch, Peter; Xiang-Yu, Huang (1 June 1992). "Initialization of the HIRLAM model using a digital filter". Monthly Weather Review. 120 (6): 1019–1034. Bibcode:1992MWRv..120.1019L. doi:10.1175/1520-0493(1992)120<1019:IOTHMU>2.0.CO;2.
