= Valerio Lucarini =

Italian-British mathematician

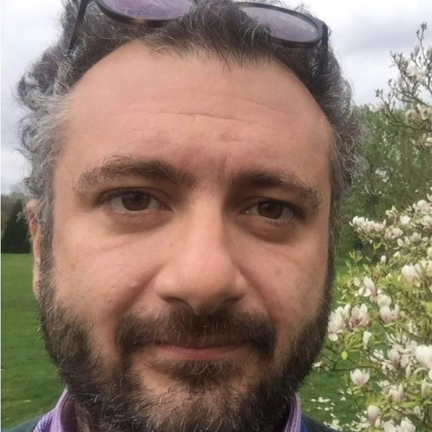
- Born: 11 August 1976 (age 50); Ancona, Italy
- Education: Scuola Normale Superiore; University of Pisa; MIT; University of Eastern Finland
- Known for: Physics of Climate
- Awards: IUGG Keilis-Borok Medal in Mathematical Geophysics (2024); SIAM Mathematics of Planet Earth Career Prize (2022); AGU Lorenz Lecture (2021); EGU L. F. Richardson Medal (2020); LMS Whitehead Prize (2018)
- Scientific career
- Fields: Climate Science; Statistical Mechanics; Condensed Matter Physics
- Thesis: (2003)
- Doctoral advisor: Kai Peiponen
- Other academic advisors: Peter H. Stone; Franco Bassani

Valerio Lucarini (born 11 August 1976 in Ancona, Italy) is an Italian and British mathematician, physicist, and climate scientist. He has given key contributions in the area of mathematics and physics of climate. In particular, he has shown how the use of statistical mechanics can advance the understanding of the link between forced and free variability of the climate system across multiple scales of motion, define a robust framework for understanding climatic tipping points, and improve our ability to interpret and model extreme events.

He is currently a Professor of Applied Mathematics at the School of Computing and Mathematical Sciences of the University of Leicester, where he coordinates the research group in computational modelling for sciences and engineering.

== Honours and awards ==
- 2025 Fellow of the American Physical Society
- 2024 Keilis-Borok Medal, International Union of Geodesy and Geophysics
- 2022 Member, Academia Europaea
- 2022 Mathematics of Planet Earth Career Prize, Society of Industrial and Applied Mathematics
- 2021 Lorenz Lecture, American Geophysical Union
- 2020 L.F. Richardson Medal, European Geophysical Union
- 2018 Whitehead Prize, London Mathematical Society
- 2010 Outstanding Young Scientist (now Arne Richter) Award, European Geophysical Union
