= Energy cascade =

Energy transfer between scales of motion

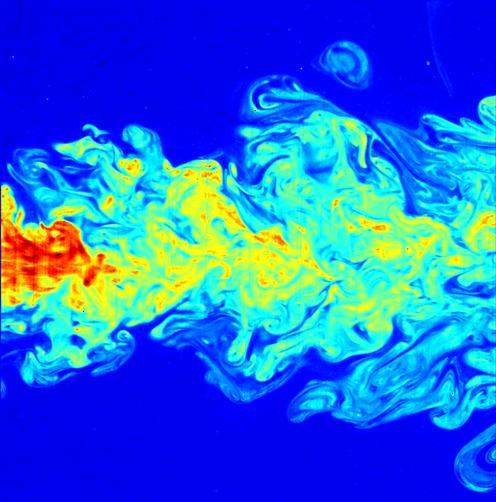
Flow visualization of a turbulent jet, made by laser-induced fluorescence. The jet exhibits a wide range of length scales, a prerequisite for the appearance of an energy cascade in the turbulence modelling.

In continuum mechanics, an energy cascade involves the transfer of energy from large scales of motion to the small scales (called a direct energy cascade) or a transfer of energy from the small scales to the large scales (called an inverse energy cascade). This transfer of energy between different scales requires that the dynamics of the system is nonlinear. Strictly speaking, a cascade requires the energy transfer to be local in scale (only between fluctuations of nearly the same size), evoking a cascading waterfall from pool to pool without long-range transfers across the scale domain.

Big whirls have little whirls
that feed on their velocity,
And little whirls have lesser whirls
and so on to viscosity

— Lewis F. Richardson, 1922

This concept plays an important role in the study of well-developed turbulence. It was first expressed by Lewis F. Richardson in the 1920s. Energy cascades are also important for wind waves in the theory of wave turbulence.

Consider for instance turbulence generated by the air flow around a tall building: the energy-containing eddies generated by flow separation have sizes of the order of tens of meters. Somewhere downstream, dissipation by viscosity takes place, for the most part, in eddies at the Kolmogorov microscales: of the order of a millimetre for the present case. At these intermediate scales, there is neither a direct forcing of the flow nor a significant amount of viscous dissipation, but there is a net nonlinear transfer of energy from the large scales to the small scales.

This intermediate range of scales, if present, is called the inertial subrange. The dynamics at these scales is described by use of self-similarity, or by assumptions – for turbulence closure – on the statistical properties of the flow in the inertial subrange. A pioneering work was the deduction by Andrey Kolmogorov in the 1940s of the expected wavenumber spectrum in the turbulence inertial subrange.

== Spectra in the inertial subrange of turbulent flow ==
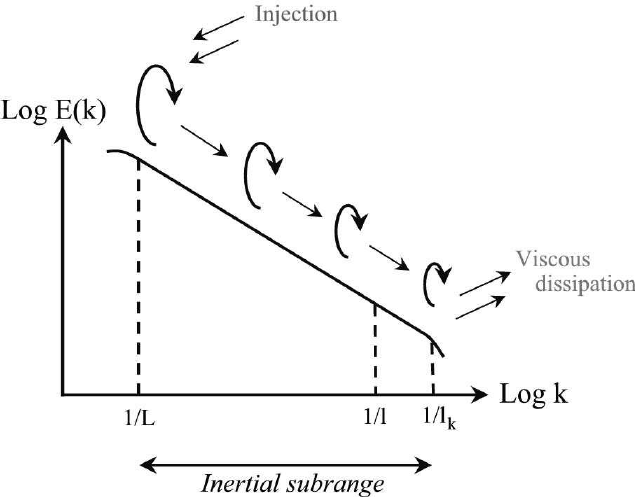
Schematic illustration of production, energy cascade and dissipation in the energy spectrum of turbulence.

The largest motions, or eddies, of turbulence contain most of the kinetic energy, whereas the smallest eddies are responsible for the viscous dissipation of turbulence kinetic energy. Kolmogorov hypothesized that when these scales are well separated, the intermediate range of length scales would be statistically isotropic, and that its characteristics in equilibrium would depend only on the rate at which kinetic energy is dissipated at the small scales. Dissipation is the frictional conversion of mechanical energy to thermal energy. The dissipation rate, $\varepsilon$, may be written down in terms of the fluctuating rates of strain in the turbulent flow and the fluid's kinematic viscosity, v. It has dimensions of energy per unit mass per second. In equilibrium, the production of turbulence kinetic energy at the large scales of motion is equal to the dissipation of this energy at the small scales.

=== Energy spectrum of turbulence ===
The energy spectrum of turbulence, E(k), is related to the mean turbulence kinetic energy per unit mass as

$$\frac{1}{2} \left( \overline{u_i u_i} \right) =  \int_0^\infty E(k)\; dk,$$

where u_{i} are the components of the fluctuating velocity, the overbar denotes an ensemble average, summation over i is implied, and k is the wavenumber. The energy spectrum, E(k), thus represents the contribution to turbulence kinetic energy by wavenumbers from k to k + dk. The largest eddies have low wavenumber, and the small eddies have high wavenumbers.

Since diffusion goes as the Laplacian of velocity, the dissipation rate may be written in terms of the energy spectrum as:

$$\varepsilon = 2\nu \int_0^\infty k^2E(k)\; dk,$$

with ν the kinematic viscosity of the fluid. From this equation, it may again be observed that dissipation is mainly associated with high wavenumbers (small eddies) even though kinetic energy is associated mainly with lower wavenumbers (large eddies).

=== Energy spectrum in the inertial subrange ===
The transfer of energy from the low wavenumbers to the high wavenumbers is the energy cascade. This transfer brings turbulence kinetic energy from the large scales to the small scales, at which viscous friction dissipates it. In the intermediate range of scales, the so-called inertial subrange, Kolmogorov's hypotheses lead to the following universal form for the energy spectrum:

$$E(k) = C \varepsilon^{2/3} k^{-5/3}.$$

An extensive body of experimental evidence supports this result, over a vast range of conditions. Experimentally, the value C = 1.5 is observed.

The result $E(k) \sim k^{-5/3}$ was first stated independently by Alexander Obukhov in 1941. Obukhov's result is equivalent to a Fourier transform of Kolmogorov's 1941 result for the turbulent structure function.

=== Spectrum of pressure fluctuations ===
The pressure fluctuations in a turbulent flow may be similarly characterized. The mean-square pressure fluctuation in a turbulent flow may be represented by a pressure spectrum, π(k):

$$\overline{p^2} =  \int_0^\infty \pi(k)\; dk.$$

For the case of turbulence with no mean velocity gradient (isotropic turbulence), the spectrum in the inertial subrange is given by

$$\pi(k) = \alpha \rho^2\varepsilon^{4/3} k^{-7/3},$$

where ρ is the fluid density, and α = 1.32 C^{2} = 2.97. A mean-flow velocity gradient (shear flow) creates an additional, additive contribution to the inertial subrange pressure spectrum which varies as k^{−11/3}; but the k^{−7/3} behavior is dominant at higher wavenumbers.

=== Spectrum of turbulence-driven disturbances at a free liquid surface ===
Pressure fluctuations below the free surface of a liquid can drive fluctuating displacements of the liquid surface, which at small wavelengths are modulated by surface tension. This free-surface–turbulence interaction may also be characterized by a wavenumber spectrum. If δ is the instantaneous displacement of the surface from its average position, the mean squared displacement may be represented with a displacement spectrum G(k) as:

$$\overline{\delta^2} =  \int_0^\infty G(k)\; dk.$$

A three dimensional form of the pressure spectrum may be combined with the Young–Laplace equation to show that:

$$G(k) \propto k^{-19/3}.$$

Experimental observation of this k^{−19/3} law has been obtained by optical measurements of the surface of turbulent free liquid jets.
