= Batchelor scale =

Length scale used in fluid dynamics

In fluid and molecular dynamics, the Batchelor scale, determined by George Batchelor (1959), describes the size of a droplet of fluid that will diffuse in the same time it takes the energy in an eddy of size η to dissipate. The Batchelor scale can be determined by:

$$\lambda_B=  \frac{ \eta }{ \sqrt{\mathrm{Sc}}} = \left( \frac{\nu D^2}{\varepsilon} \right)^\frac{1}{4}$$

where:

- $\eta = ( \nu^3 / \varepsilon )^{1/4}$ is the Kolmogorov length scale.
- Sc is the Schmidt number.
- ν is the kinematic viscosity.
- D is the mass diffusivity.
- ε is the rate of dissipation of turbulence kinetic energy per unit mass.

Similar to the Kolmogorov microscales – which describe the smallest scales of turbulence before viscosity dominates – the Batchelor scale describes the smallest length scales of fluctuations in scalar concentration that can exist before being dominated by molecular diffusion. For Sc > 1, which is common in many liquid flows, the Batchelor scale is small when compared to the Kolmogorov microscales. This means that scalar transport occurs at scales smaller than the smallest eddy size.
