= Bruce Reznick =

American mathematician

- Born: February 3, 1953 (age 73); New York City, New York
- Education: California Institute of Technology
- Known for: Non-negative polynomials
- Awards: Fellow of the American Mathematical Society (2013)
- Scientific career
- Fields: Mathematics
- Workplaces: University of Illinois at Urbana–Champaign
- Doctoral advisor: Per Enflo

Bruce Reznick (born February 3, 1953, in New York City) is an American mathematician long on the faculty at the University of Illinois at Urbana–Champaign. He is a prolific researcher noted for his contributions to number theory and the combinatorial-algebraic-analytic investigations of polynomials. In July 2019, to mark his 66th birthday, a day long symposium "Bruce Reznick 66 fest: A mensch of Combinatorial-Algebraic Mathematics" was held at the University of Bern, Switzerland.

== Education and career ==
Reznick got his B.S. in 1973 from the California Institute of Technology and his Ph.D. in 1976 from Stanford University under Per Enflo for the thesis "Banach Spaces Which Satisfy Linear Identities".

He was a Sloan Fellow (1983–1986) and is a fellow of the American Mathematical Society (AMS). From 1983 to 1985 he was on the Putnam Competition Preparation Committee of the Mathematical Association of America (MAA). As an undergraduate he had been a member of the first place team in the Putnam Competition twice, also being ranked twice in the top ten as an individual

Reznick is a frequent author on matters relating to teaching and mentoring, and the overall training of graduate students. He wrote the popular article "Chalking It Up: Advice to a New TA".

== Research ==
Reznick has done a systematic analysis of the representation of real forms of even degree as sums of powers of linear forms. This work was described in his monograph Sum of Even Powers of Real Linear Forms (Memoirs of the American Mathematical Society, 1992)

Reznick specializes in combinatorial methods in algebra, analysis and number theory, often involving polynomials, polytopes and integer sequences. He is known for his contributions to the study of sums of squares and positivity of polynomials. In joint work with M.D. Choi and T. Y. Lam, he developed the Gram matrix method for writing real polynomials as sums of squares; this method has important applications to other areas of mathematics including optimization.

== Awards ==
- 2013 fellow of the American Mathematical Society
- 2008-2009 Campus Award for Excellence in Undergraduate Teaching in the University of Illinois at Urbana-Champaign
- Reznick has an Erdős–Bacon number of 3 which puts him in a tie for the lead with MIT math professor Daniel Kleitman.

== Selected publications ==
- Reznick, Bruce (1978). "Extremal PSD forms with few terms". Duke Mathematical Journal. 45 (2). doi:10.1215/S0012-7094-78-04519-2.
- "The Pythagoras number of some affine algebras and local algebras". Journal für die reine und angewandte Mathematik (Crelle's Journal). 1982 (336): 45–82. 1982. doi:10.1515/crll.1982.336.45. MR 0671321. S2CID 116098763.
- Reznick, Bruce (1992). "Sums of even powers of real linear forms". Memoirs of the American Mathematical Society. 96 (463). doi:10.1090/memo/0463. MR 1096187.
- Choi, M. D.; Lam, T. Y.; Reznick, B. (1994). "Sums of squares of real polynomials". 𝐾-Theory and Algebraic Geometry: Connections with Quadratic Forms and Division Algebras. Proc. Sympos. Pure Math. Vol. 58. pp. 103–126. doi:10.1090/pspum/058.2/1327293. ISBN 9780821803400. MR 1327293.
- Reznick, Bruce (1995). "Uniform denominators in Hilbert's seventeenth problem". Math. Z. 220: 75–97. doi:10.1007/BF02572604. S2CID 124401982.
- Gilmer, Patrick M. (2000). "Some concrete aspects of Hilbert's 17th Problem" (PDF). Real Algebraic Geometry and Ordered Structures. Contemporary Mathematics. Vol. 253. arXiv:alg-geom/9604016. doi:10.1090/conm/253. ISBN 9780821808047.
- Powers, Victoria; Reznick, Bruce; Scheiderer, Claus; Sottile, Frank (2004). "A new approach to Hilbert's theorem on ternary quartics". Comptes Rendus Mathematique. 339 (9): 617–620. doi:10.1016/j.crma.2004.09.014. S2CID 122771781.
- Reznick, Bruce; Rouse, Jeremy (2011). "On the Sums of Two Cubes". International Journal of Number Theory. 07 (7): 1863–1882. arXiv:1012.5801. doi:10.1142/S1793042111004903. MR 2854220. S2CID 16334026.
- Reznick, Bruce; Tokcan, Neriman (2016). "Binary forms with three different relative ranks". arXiv:1608.08560 [math.AG].
