= James Tanton =

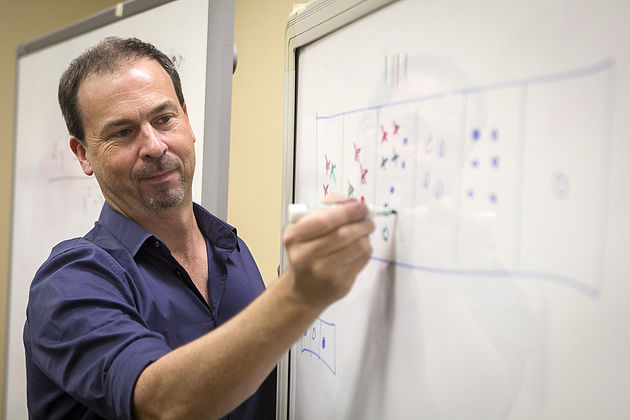
James Tanton at Region One ESC

James Stuart Tanton (born August 1, 1966) is an Australian-American mathematician and math educator. He is the Associate Coordinator of Public Programs at the Berkeley School of Education. He is also a winner of the Kidder Faculty Prize for his teaching at St. Mark's School, Mathematician-at-Large at the Mathematical Association of America, author of over ten books on mathematics, curriculum, and education, and creator of videos on mathematics on YouTube. As of May 2026, his approximately 590 videos had earned over 8.4 million views.

== Education and professional work ==
Tanton received his B.A. in mathematics from the University of Adelaide, and he earned his Ph.D. in mathematics from Princeton University in 1994, with a thesis in algebraic topology titled A Homological Fibration for Gl [infinity]. He taught at the New College, St. Mary's College of Maryland, and Merrimack College before deciding that, to gain credibility with the high school teachers he hoped to work with, he had to teach high school himself. Tanton taught at St. Mark's School in Southborough, Massachusetts, from 2002 to 2011.

Tanton has worked as a presenter with Maths Week Ireland, the ABWA Infinity Program (India), the Data Math Lab (Romania); and many other international programs. He is the co-founder of the Global Math Project, which has brought innovative curriculum on the topic of place-value, polynomial algebra, etc. to over 7.8 million students and teachers from over 150 countries and territories. Tanton is also the Chief Mathematics Officer for "All the Maths" with SmartWithIt, a math program designed to help students better understand and experience the human relevance of mathematics.

Tanton is currently the Associate Coordinator of Public Programs at the Berkeley School of Education.

== Personal life ==
Since graduating from the University of Adelaide in 1988, Tanton has been living in the US. He is settled there with his family; his spouse is planetary scientist Lindy Elkins-Tanton, who was born in Ithaca, New York.

== Selected awards and honors ==
- President's Award for Innovation (ASU Study Hall, College Algebra) 2021
- Joint Policy Board of Mathematics Communication Award, 2020
- MathMovesU Math Hero Award for mathematics middle and high school teaching, sponsored by Raytheon Company, 2010
- The Kidder Faculty Prize for teaching at St. Mark's School, 2006
- The Mathematical Association of America's Beckenback Book Prize for Solve This: Mathematical Activities for Students and Clubs, 2005
- The Mathematical Association of America's Trevor Evans Award for distinguished writing in both 2001 and 2002
- Homer L. Dodge Award for college teaching excellence at The St. Mary's College of Maryland, 1999
- Princeton University Engineering Council Teaching Award, for teaching excellence, 1994

== Selected books by Tanton ==
Mathematics Galore: The First Five Years of the St. Mark’s Institute of Mathematics, Mathematical Association of America, 2012
The Encyclopedia of Mathematics, Facts on File.2005.
Solve This: Mathematical Activities for Students and Clubs, Mathematical Association of America, 2001.

== Self-published texts and curricular material ==
THINKING MATHEMATICS! series:

- Volume 1: Arithmetic = Gateway to All
- Volume 2: Advanced Counting and Advanced Algebra Systems
- Volume 3: Lines, Circles, Trigonometry and Conics
- Volume 4: Functions and their Graphs
- Volume 5: e, i, pi and all that!
- Volume 6: Calculus

GEOMETRY: Volume I and GEOMETRY: Volume 2
MATH WITHOUT WORDS
MATHEMATICAL THINKING: Numbers and their Algebra (An advanced course for middle-school students and their teachers.)
