= Colm Mulcahy =

Irish mathematician and academic (born 1958)

Professor Emeritus Colm Mulcahy
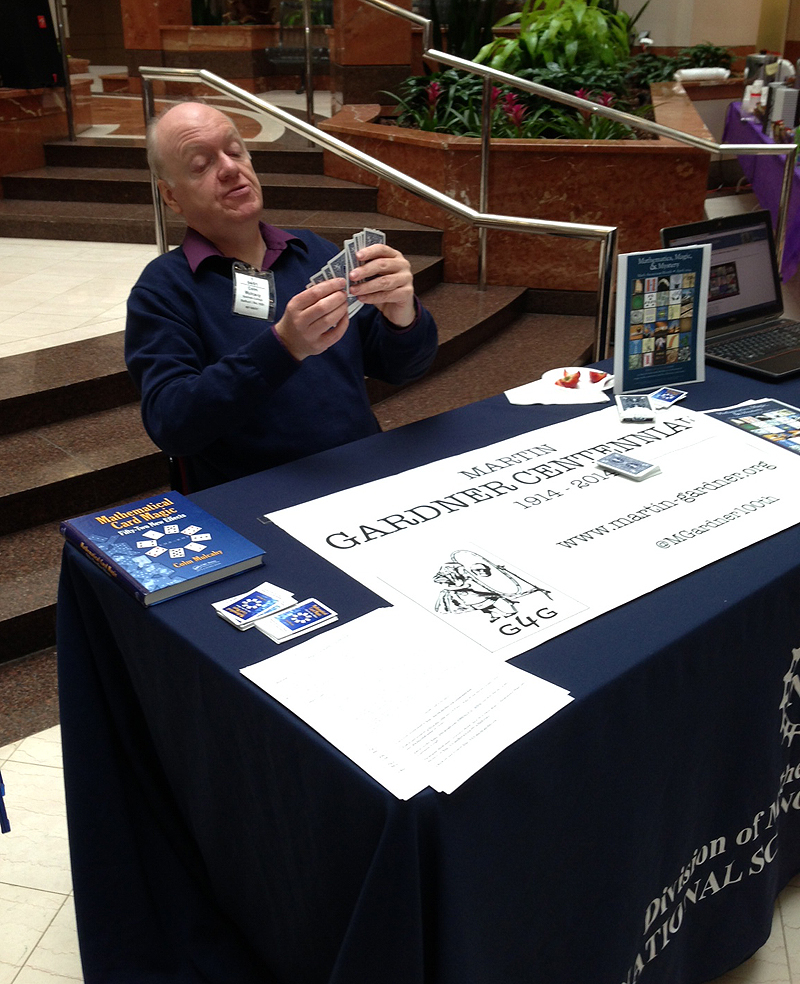
- Mulcahy kicking off Math Awareness Month in 2014
- Education: University College Dublin, Cornell University
- Spouse: Vicki Powers
- Scientific career
- Workplaces: Spelman College

Colm Mulcahy (born September 1958) is an Irish mathematician, academic, columnist, book author, public outreach speaker, amateur magician and Professor Emeritus at Spelman College. In addition to algebra, number theory, and geometry, his interests include mathemagical card magic and the culture of mathematics–particularly the contributions of Irish mathematicians and also the works of iconic mathematics writer Martin Gardner.

In 2024 he received the Maths Week Ireland Award.

== Education and career ==
Mulcahy got his BSc and MSc in mathematical science at University College Dublin in 1978 and 1979, and a PhD from Cornell University in 1985 where his advisor was Alex F. T. W. Rosenberg. From 1988 to 2020, he taught mathematics at Spelman College, in Atlanta, Georgia, and is now Professor Emeritus. He served as chair of the department there from 2003 to 2006 and recently created the Archive of Spelman Mathematicians. In 2014 he was one of the organizers of Mathematics Awareness Month.

He has blogged for the Mathematical Association of America, The Huffington Post, Scientific American, and (aperiodically) for The Aperiodical. His puzzles have been featured in The New York Times and The Guardian.<ref=numberland>Algebra-cadabra! Here's a classic magic trick, and the mathematical secret behind it by Alex Bellos, The Guardian, Tue 4 Feb 2014 </ref> Mulcahy serves on the Advisory Council of the Museum of Mathematics in New York City. From January 2021 to December 2024, he was the Chair of Gathering 4 Gardner, Inc. He is the creator and curator of the Annals of Irish Mathematics and Mathematicians.

Mulcahy has an Erdös number of 2, as a result of a collaboration with Neil Calkin.

== Legacy of Martin Gardner ==
Mulcahy was a friend of longtime Scientific American columnist Martin Gardner during the last decade of Gardner's life. Mulcahy is a mainstay of Gathering 4 Gardner (Vice-President 2016-2020, Chair 2021–2024), an organisation formed to honour the wide-ranging contributions made by the celebrated mathematician, skeptic, magician, philosopher, and writer. Usually shortened to G4G, it first met in 1993 and since 1996 meets every two years. In 2013 he created the official Martin Gardner site, and in 2013–2014 he chaired the Martin Gardner Centennial Committee. Mulcahy has been particularly active in promoting an associated series of meetings known as Celebration of Mind, also inspired by the works of Gardner. These days there are over 100 of these latter events every year, all around the world.

== Irish mathematicians and mathematics ==
Mulcahy frequently writes about the culture and history of mathematics in Ireland. He is active in both Maths Week Ireland, the world's largest mathematics outreach program, and the Irish Mathematical Society. He is the creator and curator of the Annals of Irish Mathematics and Mathematicians, which chronicles four centuries of mathematical activity in Ireland, and has hosted monthly blogs since September 2016. This is now sponsored by Maths Week Ireland, which has produced annual Irish Mathematics Calendars since 2016.

== Card magic ==
Mulcahy is recognised as an authority on the mathematical principles and effects underlying cards tricks. From 2004 to 2014 he authored Card Colm, a column about mathematics and magic–especially card magic–for the Mathematical Association of America. Much of this work is collected in his book Mathematical Card Magic: Fifty-Two New Effects He has appeared in Brady Haran's Numberphile web series.

== Awards ==
In 1997 Mulcahy received the MAA's Allendoerfer Award for excellence in expository writing for a paper on the basics of wavelet image compression. An article he co-authored, on the centennial of Martin Gardner, was featured in the book, The Best Writing on Mathematics 2015.

In 2024 he received the Maths Week Ireland Award for outstanding work in raising public awareness of mathematics. In his acceptance remarks, Mulcahy said,

Maths is a language that explains so much of the world around us: the sun, moon, planets and stars, hence the calendar and tides here on earth. That’s how it started for us humans; that and commerce. It’s about observation, curiosity and patterns, explaining symmetries and coincidences, navigating on earth and in space, and making reliable predictions.

== Personal ==
Mulcahy was married to Vicki Powers, an algebraic geometer and election theorist. They had the same doctoral advisor at Cornell, Alex F. T. W. Rosenberg.
