= Encyclopedia of Mathematics (James Tanton) =

- Author: James Stuart Tanton
- Language: English
- Subject: Mathematics
- Publisher: Facts on File
- Publication date: 2005
- Publication place: United States
- Media type: Print (Hardcover and Paperback)
- Pages: 576
- ISBN: 0816051240
- OCLC: 438169762

Encyclopedia of Mathematics is a 2005 encyclopedic reference work by Australian–American mathematician James Tanton that was published by Facts-on-File of New York.

== Synopsis ==
The book has over 1000 entries, which discuss various concepts, definitions, people, and theorems that pertain to mathematics. The book also contains six essays that discuss the various branches of mathematics and their history.

== Reception ==
Booklist praised the book as a useful "basic resource for students who wish to have a better understanding of simple or not-so--simple mathematical concepts" and the School Library Journal called the encyclopedia "comprehensive".
