= Maths Week Ireland =

- Abbreviation: MWI
- Founded: 2006
- Founders: Sheila Donegan and Eoin Gill
- Purpose: promote awareness, appreciation and understanding of maths through a huge variety of events
- Region served: both parts of Ireland
- Key people: Sheila Donegan; Director of CALMAST; Eoin Gill; Coordinator of MWI; Cordula Weiss; Programme Manager CALMAST; Rosario Burke; Educational Resources Manager; Diane Murphey; Educational Resources Manager; Ben Dolan; Digital Engagement Manager
- Website: mathsweek.ie

Maths Week Ireland (MWI) is an annual all-island (Republic of Ireland and Northern Ireland) mathematics outreach initiative which takes place throughout Ireland each October. It was founded in 2006 by Waterford Institute of Technology (now SETU) staff members Eoin Gill and Sheila Donegan (based on an idea by Gill), and is a project of that institution's STEM outreach Centre for the Advancement of Learning of Maths, Science and Technology (CALMAST). Gill (an engineer) and Donegan (a chemist) continue to direct and run MWI.

In 2019 MWI engaged over 400,000 people on an island with a population of under 7 million and is arguably the world's largest mathematics festival.

== Purpose ==
MWI is a partnership of over 50 organizations dedicated to promoting and celebrating mathematics across the island of Ireland, including universities, institutes of technology, colleges, museums, libraries, visitor centres, and other professional bodies. Maths Week Ireland is currently supported by the Irish Government’s Department of Education and Taighde Eireann, Research Ireland (formerly SFI), and the Northern Ireland government’s Department for the Economy and technology company AMD.

MWI targets school and universities, as well as hosting weekend "street fairs" in cities such as Dublin, Belfast and Cork. Events are run by the participants with materials delivered online by Maths Week Ireland. Most schools run their own special activities. Maths Week is a nine-day event (a Saturday to the Sunday of the following weekend, inclusive) which always includes the 16th of October, the day in 1843 when William R. Hamilton discovered quaternions. The idea has been so successful that it has now been replicated in England and Scotland.

MWI hosts the Maths Ireland website which is home to the monthly blogs of the Annals of Irish Mathematics & Mathematicians (AIMM), authored by Colm Mulcahy.

Starting in 2016, MWI has also produced the annual Irish Maths Calendars which are also archived at the Maths Ireland site.

== Presenters ==
Mathematicians and mathematics popularizers who have been MWI presenters include:

- David Acheson
- John D. Barrow
- Chris Budd
- Eugenia Cheng
- Keith Devlin
- Rob Eastaway
- Raymond Flood
- James Grime
- Tiago Hirth
- Andrew Jeffrey
- Colm Mulcahy
- Matt Parker
- Kjartan Poskitt
- Mark Saul
- Marcus du Sautoy
- Bobby Seagull
- David Singmaster
- Katie Steckles
- James Tanton
- Robin Wilson
- Colin Wright

== Maths Week Ireland Award ==
In 2016 MWI inaugurated the annual Maths Week Ireland Award to honor outstanding work in raising public awareness of mathematics. The award is presented during Maths Week Ireland. Awardees so far are:

- 2025: Paul Nugent
- 2024: Colm Mulcahy
- 2023: Ciaran O'Sullivan and Terry Maguire
- 2022: Rafael de Andrade Moral
- 2021: Dara Ó Briain
- 2020: Aoibhinn Ní Shúilleabháin
- 2019: Mark McCartney
- 2018: Anthony O’Farrell and Fiacre Ó Cairbre who founded the annual Hamilton Walk
- 2017: Peter Lynch
- 2016: Des MacHale
