= Sum-of-squares optimization =

Numerical optimization process

A sum-of-squares optimization program is an optimization problem with a linear cost function and constraints that certain polynomials constructed from the decision variables should be sums of squares. When the maximum degree of the polynomials involved is fixed, sum-of-squares optimization is also known as the Lasserre hierarchy of semidefinite programming relaxations.

Sum-of-squares optimization techniques have been applied across a variety of areas, including control theory (in particular, for searching for polynomial Lyapunov functions for dynamical systems described by polynomial vector fields), statistics, finance and machine learning.

== Background ==
A polynomial $p$ is a sum of squares (SOS) if there exist polynomials $\{f_i\}_{i=1}^m$ such that $p = \sum_{i=1}^m f_i^2$. For example,
$$p=x^2 - 4xy + 7y^2$$
is a sum of squares since
$$p = f_1^2 + f_2^2$$
where
$$f_1 = (x-2y)\text{ and }f_2 = \sqrt{3}y.$$
Note that if $p$ is a sum of squares then $p(x) \ge 0$ for all $x \in \R^n$. Detailed descriptions of polynomial SOS are available.

Quadratic forms can be expressed as $p(x)=x^T Q x$ where $Q$ is a symmetric matrix. Similarly, polynomials of degree ≤ 2d can be expressed as
$$p(x)=z(x)^\mathsf{T} Q z(x) ,$$
where the vector $z$ contains all monomials of degree $\le d$. This is known as the Gram matrix form. An important fact is that $p$ is SOS if and only if there exists a symmetric and positive-semidefinite matrix $Q$ such that $p(x) = z(x)^\mathsf{T} Q z(x)$. This provides a connection between SOS polynomials and positive-semidefinite matrices.

== Optimization problem ==
A sum-of-squares optimization problem is a conic optimization problem with respect to the cone of sum-of-squares polynomials. Concretely, given a vector $c\in \R^n$ and polynomials $a_{k,j}$ for $k=1, \dots N_s$, $j = 0, 1, \dots, n$, a sum-of-squares optimization problem is written as

$$\begin{aligned}
\underset{u\in\R^n}{\text{maximize}} \quad & c^T u \\
\text{subject to} \quad &
a_{k,0}(x) + a_{k,1}(x)u_1 + \cdots + a_{k,n}(x)u_n \in \text{SOS} \quad (k=1,\ldots, N_s).
\end{aligned}$$

Here "SOS" represents the class of sum-of-squares (SOS) polynomials. The quantities $u\in \R^n$ are the decision variables. SOS programs can be converted to semidefinite programs (SDPs) using the duality of the SOS polynomial program and a relaxation for constrained polynomial optimization using positive-semidefinite matrices, see the following section.

== Dual problem: constrained polynomial optimization ==
Consider a nonlinear optimization problem of the form
$$\begin{align}
&\underset{x \in \mathbb{R}^{n}}{\operatorname{minimize}}& & p(x) \\
&\operatorname{subject\;to}
& & a_i(x) = 0, \quad i = 1, \dots, m
\end{align}$$

where $p(x): \mathbb{R}^n \to \mathbb{R}$ is an n-variate polynomial and each $a_i(x)$ is an n-variate polynomial of degree at most 2d. The same problem can be rewritten as

$$\begin{align} &\underset{x \in \mathbb{R}^{n}}{\operatorname{minimize}}& & \langle C, x^{\le d} (x^{\le d})^\top \rangle \\ &\operatorname{subject\;to} & & \langle A_i, x^{\le d}(x^{\le d})^\top \rangle = 0, \quad i = 1, \dots, m \\ &&& x_{\emptyset} = 1 \end{align}$$	1

where $x^{\le d}$ is the $n^{O(d)}$-dimensional vector with one entry for every monomial in x of degree at most d, so that for each multiset $S \subset [n], |S| \le d,$ $x_S = \prod_{i \in S}x_i$, $C$ is a Gram matrix p, and $A_i$ is a Gram matrix of $a_i$. We adopt the convention that $x_{\emptyset} = 1$, so that the constant coefficient can be included in the Gram matrix of a polynomial.

This problem is non-convex in general. One can try to relax the problem to a convex one using semidefinite programming to replace the rank-one matrix of variables $x^{\le d} (x^{\le d})^\top$ with a positive semidefinite matrix $X$: we index each monomial of size at most $2d$ by a multiset $S$ of at most $2d$ indices, $S \subset [n], |S| \le 2d$. For each such monomial, we create a variable $X_S$ in the program, and we arrange the variables $X_S$ to form the matrix $X \in \mathbb{R}^{[n]^{\le d} \times [n]^{\le d}}$, where $\R^{[n]^{\le d}\times [n]^{\le d}}$ is the set of real matrices whose rows and columns are identified with multisets of elements from $n$ of size at most $d$. We then write the following semidefinite program in the variables $X_S$:

$$\begin{align}
&\underset{X \in \R^{[n]^{\le d} \times [n]^{\le d}} }{\operatorname{minimize}}& & \langle C, X \rangle \\
&\operatorname{subject\;to}
& & X_{U,V} = X_{S,T}, \quad \forall \ U,V,S,T \in [n]^{\le d}, U \cup V = S \cup T \\
&&& \langle A_i, X \rangle =0, \quad i = 1, \dots, m \\
&&& X_{\emptyset} = 1 \\
&&& X \succeq 0
\end{align}$$

where again C is a Gram matrix of p and $A_i$ is a Gram matrix of $a_i$. The first constraint ensures that the value of a monomial that appears several times within the matrix is equal throughout the matrix, and is added to make the matrix $X$ respect the same symmetries present in the matrix $x^{\le d}(x^{\le d})^\top$.

=== Duality ===
One can take the dual of the above semidefinite program and obtain the following program:

$$\begin{align}
&\underset{y \in \mathbb{R}^{m'}}{\operatorname{minimize}}& & y_0 \\
&\operatorname{subject\;to}
& & C - y_0 e_{\emptyset}- \sum_{i \in [m]} y_i A_i - \sum_{S\cup T = U\cup V} y_{S,T,U,V} (e_{S,T} - e_{U,V})\succeq 0
\end{align}$$

We have a variable $y_0$ corresponding to the constraint $\langle e_{\emptyset}, X\rangle = 1$ (where $e_{\emptyset}$ is the matrix with all entries zero save for the entry indexed by $(\varnothing,\varnothing)$), a real variable $y_i$ for each polynomial constraint $\langle X,A_i \rangle = 0 \quad s.t. i \in [m],$ and for each group of multisets $S,T,U,V \subset [n], |S|,|T|,|U|,|V| \le d, S\cup T = U \cup V$, we have a dual variable $y_{S,T,U,V}$ for the symmetry constraint $\langle X, e_{S,T} - e_{U,V} \rangle = 0$. The positive-semidefiniteness constraint ensures that $p(x) - y_0$ is a sum-of-squares of polynomials over $A \subset \R^n$: by a characterization of positive-semidefinite matrices, for any positive-semidefinite matrix $Q\in \mathbb{R}^{m \times m}$, we can write $Q = \sum_{i \in [m]} f_i f_i^\top$ for vectors $f_i \in \mathbb{R}^m$. Thus for any $x \in A \subset \mathbb{R}^n$,
$$\begin{align}
p(x) - y_0
&= p(x) - y_0 - \sum_{i \in [m']} y_i a_i(x) \qquad \text{since } x \in A\\
&=(x^{\le d})^\top \left( C - y_0 e_{\emptyset} - \sum_{i\in [m']} y_i A_i - \sum_{S\cup T = U \cup V} y_{S,T,U,V}(e_{S,T}-e_{U,V}) \right)x^{\le d}\qquad \text{by symmetry}\\
&= (x^{\le d})^\top \left( \sum_{i} f_i f_i^\top \right)x^{\le d} \\
&= \sum_{i} \langle x^{\le d}, f_i\rangle^2 \\
&= \sum_{i} f_i(x)^2,
\end{align}$$

where we have identified the vectors $f_i$ with the coefficients of a polynomial of degree at most $d$. This gives a sum-of-squares proof that the value $p(x) \ge y_0$ over $A \subset \mathbb{R}^n$.

The above can also be extended to regions $A \subset \mathbb{R}^n$ defined by polynomial inequalities.

== Sum-of-squares hierarchy ==
The sum-of-squares hierarchy (SOS hierarchy), also known as the Lasserre hierarchy, is a hierarchy of convex relaxations of increasing power and increasing computational cost. For each natural number $d \in \mathbb{N}$ the corresponding convex relaxation is known as the $d$th level or $d$-th round of the SOS hierarchy. The $1$st round, when $d=1$, corresponds to a basic semidefinite program, or to sum-of-squares optimization over polynomials of degree at most $2$. To augment the basic convex program at the $1$st level of the hierarchy to $d$-th level, additional variables and constraints are added to the program to have the program consider polynomials of degree at most $2d$.

The SOS hierarchy derives its name from the fact that the value of the objective function at the $d$-th level is bounded with a sum-of-squares proof using polynomials of degree at most $2d$ via the dual (see "Duality" above). Consequently, any sum-of-squares proof that uses polynomials of degree at most $2d$ can be used to bound the objective value, allowing one to prove guarantees on the tightness of the relaxation.

In conjunction with a theorem of Berg, this further implies that given sufficiently many rounds, the relaxation becomes arbitrarily tight on any fixed interval. Berg's result states that every non-negative real polynomial within a bounded interval can be approximated within accuracy $\varepsilon$ on that interval with a sum-of-squares of real polynomials of sufficiently high degree, and thus if $OBJ(x)$ is the polynomial objective value as a function of the point $x$, if the inequality $c + \varepsilon - OBJ(x) \ge 0$ holds for all $x$ in the region of interest, then there must be a sum-of-squares proof of this fact. Choosing $c$ to be the minimum of the objective function over the feasible region, we have the result.

=== Computational cost ===
When optimizing over a function in $n$ variables, the $d$-th level of the hierarchy can be written as a semidefinite program over $n^{O(d)}$ variables, and can be solved in time $n^{O(d)}$ using the ellipsoid method.

== Hermitian sum-of-squares optimization ==
A Hermitian polynomial is a function of $n$ complex variables $z_1, \dots, z_n$ and their conjugates $z_1^*, \dots, z_n^*$ which takes on only real values for all complex $z$. One can also consider semidefinite programming relaxations based on Hermitian sums of squares (HSOS) $g_1^*g_1 + \dots + g_k^*g_k$ where each $g_i$ is a polynomial in only the variables $z_1, \dots, z_n$ and not their conjugates. The resulting semidefinite programs converge to the true optimum asymptotically in all well-behaved cases and reduce to calculating the largest eigenvalues of explicitly given matrices, as first observed by Putinar.

== Software tools ==
- SOSTOOLS, licensed under the GNU GPL. The reference guide is available at arXiv:1310.4716 [math.OC], and a presentation about its internals is available here.
- CDCS-sos, a package from CDCS, an augmented Lagrangian method solver, to deal with large scale SOS programs.
- The SumOfSquares extension of JuMP for Julia.
- TSSOS for Julia, a polynomial optimization tool based on the sparsity adapted moment-SOS hierarchies.
- For the dual problem of constrained polynomial optimization, GloptiPoly for MATLAB/Octave, Ncpol2sdpa for Python and MomentOpt for Julia.

== See also ==
- Krivine-Stengle Positivstellensatz
- Positive polynomial
