= Turbulence =

Motion characterized by chaotic changes in pressure and flow velocity

In fluid dynamics, turbulence or turbulent flow is fluid motion exhibiting chaotic changes in pressure and flow velocity. It is in contrast to laminar flow, which occurs when a fluid flows in parallel layers with no disruption between those layers.

Turbulence is commonly observed in everyday phenomena such as surf, fast-flowing rivers, billowing storm clouds, or smoke from a chimney, and most fluid flows occurring in nature or created in engineering applications are turbulent. Turbulence is caused by excessive kinetic energy in parts of a fluid flow, which overcomes the damping effect of the fluid's viscosity. For this reason, turbulence commonly occurs in low-viscosity fluids. In turbulent flow, unsteady vortices of many sizes appear and interact with each other; consequently, drag due to friction increases.

The onset of turbulence can be predicted by the dimensionless Reynolds number, the ratio of kinetic energy to viscous damping in a fluid flow. However, turbulence has long resisted detailed physical analysis, and the interactions within turbulence create a very complex phenomenon. Physicist Richard Feynman described turbulence as the most important unsolved problem in classical physics.

The turbulence intensity affects many fields, for example, fish ecology, air pollution, precipitation, and climate change.

== Examples of turbulence ==
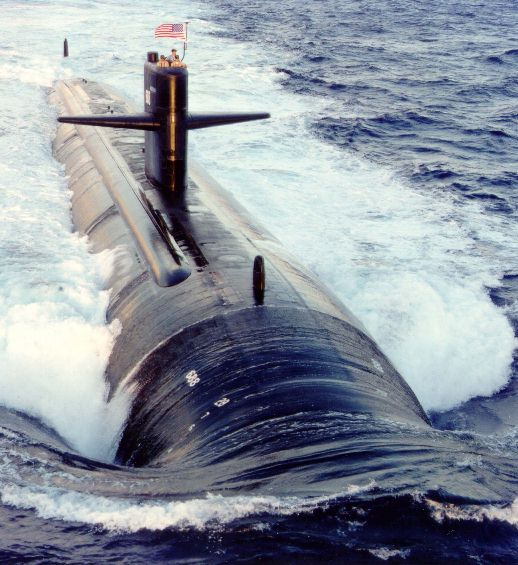
Laminar and turbulent water flow over the hull of a submarine. As the relative velocity of the water increases, turbulence occurs.

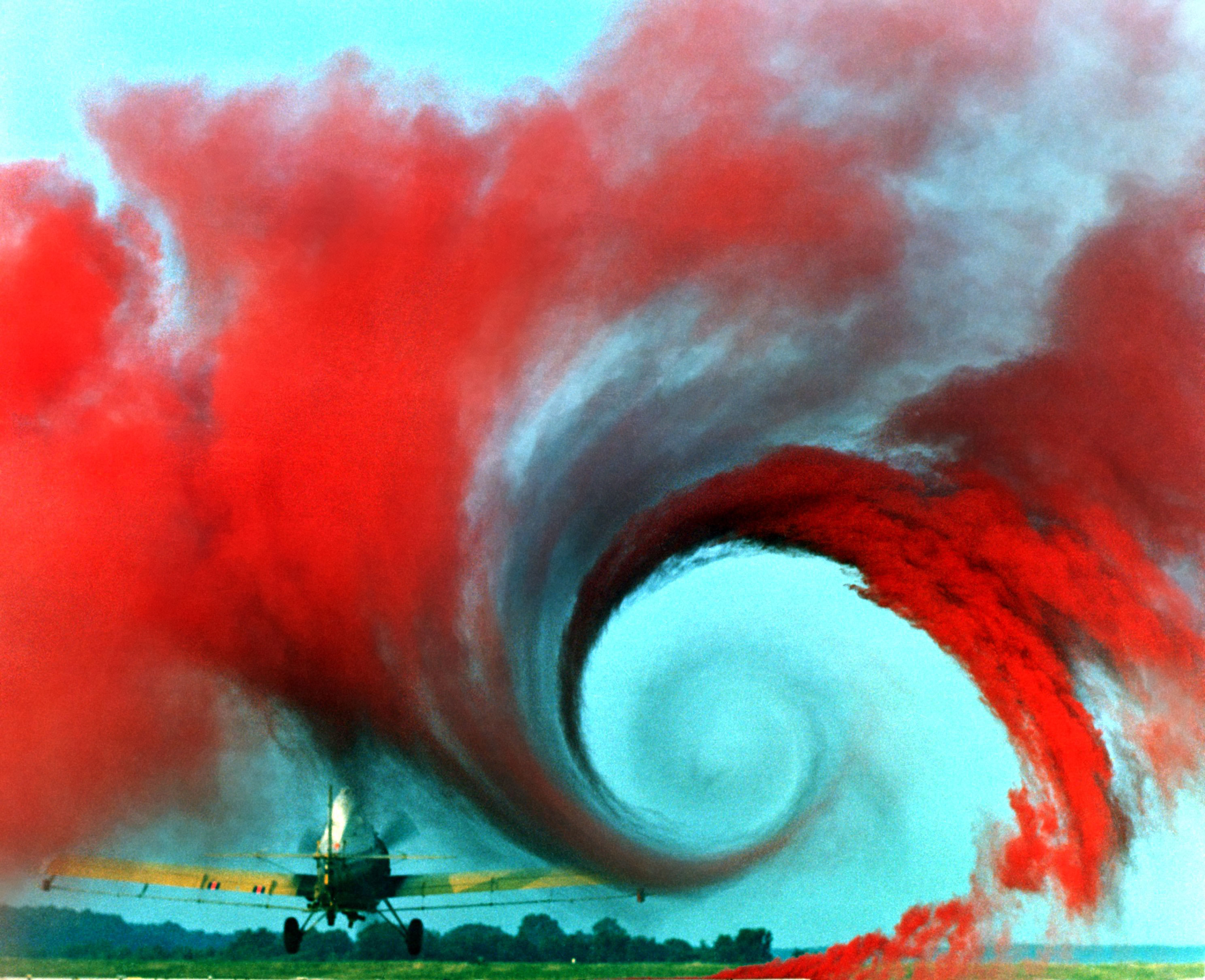
Turbulence in the tip vortex from an airplane wing passing through coloured smoke

- Smoke rising from a cigarette. For the first few centimeters, the smoke is laminar. The smoke plume becomes turbulent as its Reynolds number increases with increases in flow velocity and characteristic length scale.
- Flow over a golf ball. (This can be best understood by considering the golf ball to be stationary, with air flowing over it.) If the golf ball were smooth, the boundary layer flow over the front of the sphere would be laminar at typical conditions. However, the boundary layer would separate early, as the pressure gradient switched from favorable (pressure decreasing in the flow direction) to unfavorable (pressure increasing in the flow direction), creating a large region of low pressure behind the ball that creates high form drag. To prevent this, the surface is dimpled to perturb the boundary layer and promote turbulence. This results in higher skin friction, but it moves the point of boundary layer separation further along, resulting in lower drag.
- Clear-air turbulence experienced during airplane flight, as well as poor astronomical seeing (the blurring of images seen through the atmosphere).
- Most of the terrestrial atmospheric circulation.
- The oceanic and atmospheric mixed layers and intense oceanic currents.
- The flow conditions in many industrial equipment (such as pipes, ducts, precipitators, gas scrubbers, dynamic scraped surface heat exchangers, etc.) and machines (for instance, internal combustion engines and gas turbines).
- The external flow over all kinds of vehicles such as cars, airplanes, ships, and submarines.
- The motions of matter in stellar atmospheres.
- A jet exhausting from a nozzle into a quiescent fluid. As the flow emerges into this external fluid, shear layers originating at the lips of the nozzle are created. These layers separate the fast moving jet from the external fluid, and at a certain critical Reynolds number they become unstable and break down to turbulence.
- Biologically generated turbulence resulting from swimming animals affects ocean mixing.
- Snow fences work by inducing turbulence in the wind, forcing it to drop much of its snow load near the fence.
- Bridge supports (piers) in water. When river flow is slow, water flows smoothly around the support legs. When the flow is faster, a higher Reynolds number is associated with the flow. The flow may start off laminar but is quickly separated from the leg and becomes turbulent.
- In many geophysical flows (rivers, atmospheric boundary layer), the flow turbulence is dominated by the coherent structures and turbulent events. A turbulent event is a series of turbulent fluctuations that contain more energy than the average flow turbulence. The turbulent events are associated with coherent flow structures such as eddies and turbulent bursting, and they play a critical role in terms of sediment scour, accretion and transport in rivers as well as contaminant mixing and dispersion in rivers and estuaries, and in the atmosphere.
Unsolved problem in physics
Is it possible to make a theoretical model to describe the behavior of a turbulent flow—in particular, its internal structures?
More unsolved problems in physics
- In the medical field of cardiology, a stethoscope is used to detect heart sounds and bruits, which are due to turbulent blood flow. In normal individuals, heart sounds are a product of turbulent flow as heart valves close. However, in some conditions turbulent flow can be audible due to other reasons, some of them pathological. For example, in advanced atherosclerosis, bruits (and therefore turbulent flow) can be heard in some vessels that have been narrowed by the disease process.
- Recently, turbulence in porous media became a highly debated subject.
- Strategies used by animals for olfactory navigation, and their success, are heavily influenced by turbulence affecting the odor plume.
- Pyroclastic flow, one of the deadliest and most destructive volcanic eruption hazards consisting of hot, fast-moving gas and volcanic matter, experiences turbulence. Made up of chemically diverse components, pyroclastic flows have heterogeneous distributions in physical features such as temperature, density, and flow velocity. These differences promote turbulent mixing within the flows themselves as well as with the external environment as they move down volcanic slopes. Turbulent mixing eventually allows for greater homogeneity within pyroclastic flows.

== Features ==
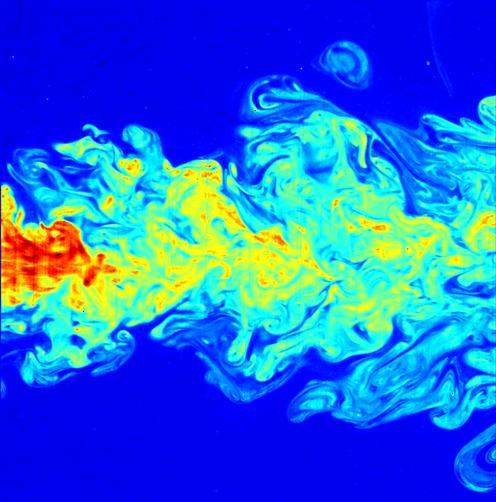
Flow visualization of a turbulent jet, made by laser-induced fluorescence. The jet exhibits a wide range of length scales, an important characteristic of turbulent flows.

Turbulence is characterized by the following features:

Irregularity
Turbulent flows are always highly irregular. For this reason, turbulence problems are normally treated statistically rather than deterministically. Turbulent flow is chaotic. However, not all chaotic flows are turbulent.
Diffusivity
The readily available supply of energy in turbulent flows tends to accelerate the homogenization (mixing) of fluid mixtures. The characteristic which is responsible for the enhanced mixing and increased rates of mass, momentum and energy transports in a flow is called "diffusivity".

Turbulent diffusion is usually described by a turbulent diffusion coefficient. This turbulent diffusion coefficient is defined in a phenomenological sense, by analogy with the molecular diffusivities, but it does not have a true physical meaning, being dependent on the flow conditions, and not a property of the fluid itself. In addition, the turbulent diffusivity concept assumes a constitutive relation between a turbulent flux and the gradient of a mean variable similar to the relation between flux and gradient that exists for molecular transport. In the best case, this assumption is only an approximation. Nevertheless, the turbulent diffusivity is the simplest approach for quantitative analysis of turbulent flows, and many models have been postulated to calculate it. For instance, in large bodies of water like oceans this coefficient can be found using Richardson's four-third power law and is governed by the random walk principle. In rivers and large ocean currents, the diffusion coefficient is given by variations of Elder's formula.

Rotationality
Turbulent flows have non-zero vorticity and are characterized by a strong three-dimensional vortex generation mechanism known as vortex stretching. In fluid dynamics, they are essentially vortices subjected to stretching associated with a corresponding increase of the component of vorticity in the stretching direction—due to the conservation of angular momentum. On the other hand, vortex stretching is the core mechanism on which the turbulence energy cascade relies to establish and maintain identifiable structure function. In general, the stretching mechanism implies thinning of the vortices in the direction perpendicular to the stretching direction due to volume conservation of fluid elements. As a result, the radial length scale of the vortices decreases and the larger flow structures break down into smaller structures. The process continues until the small scale structures are small enough that their kinetic energy can be transformed by the fluid's molecular viscosity into heat. Turbulent flow is always rotational and three dimensional. For example, atmospheric cyclones are rotational but their substantially two-dimensional shapes do not allow vortex generation and so are not turbulent. On the other hand, oceanic flows are dispersive but essentially non rotational and therefore are not turbulent.
Dissipation
To sustain turbulent flow, a persistent source of energy supply is required because turbulence dissipates rapidly as the kinetic energy is converted into internal energy by viscous shear stress. Turbulence causes the formation of eddies of many different length scales. Most of the kinetic energy of the turbulent motion is contained in the large-scale structures. The energy "cascades" from these large-scale structures to smaller scale structures by an inertial and essentially inviscid mechanism. This process continues, creating smaller and smaller structures which produces a hierarchy of eddies. Eventually this process creates structures that are small enough that molecular diffusion becomes important and viscous dissipation of energy finally takes place. The scale at which this happens is the Kolmogorov length scale. Via this energy cascade, turbulent flow can be realized as a superposition of a spectrum of flow velocity fluctuations and eddies upon a mean flow. The eddies are loosely defined as coherent patterns of flow velocity, vorticity and pressure. Turbulent flows may be viewed as made of an entire hierarchy of eddies over a wide range of length scales and the hierarchy can be described by the energy spectrum that measures the energy in flow velocity fluctuations for each length scale (wavenumber). The scales in the energy cascade are generally uncontrollable and highly non-symmetric. Nevertheless, based on these length scales these eddies can be divided into three categories.
Integral time scale
The integral time scale for a Lagrangian flow can be defined as:
$$T = \frac{1}{\langle u'u'\rangle} \int_0^\infty \langle u'u'(\tau)\rangle \, d\tau$$
where u′ is the velocity fluctuation, and $\tau$ is the time lag between measurements.
Integral length scales
Large eddies obtain energy from the mean flow and also from each other. Thus, these are the energy production eddies which contain most of the energy. They have the large flow velocity fluctuation and are low in frequency. Integral scales are highly anisotropic and are defined in terms of the normalized two-point flow velocity correlations. The maximum length of these scales is constrained by the characteristic length of the apparatus. For example, the largest integral length scale of pipe flow is equal to the pipe diameter. In the case of atmospheric turbulence, this length can reach up to the order of several hundreds kilometers.: The integral length scale can be defined as
$$L = \frac{1}{\langle u'u'\rangle} \int_0^\infty \langle u'u'(r)\rangle \, dr$$
where r is the distance between two measurement locations, and u′ is the velocity fluctuation in that same direction.
Kolmogorov length scales
Smallest scales in the spectrum that form the viscous sub-layer range. In this range, the energy input from nonlinear interactions and the energy drain from viscous dissipation are in exact balance. The small scales have high frequency, causing turbulence to be locally isotropic and homogeneous.
Taylor microscales
The intermediate scales between the largest and the smallest scales which make the inertial subrange. Taylor microscales are not dissipative scales, but pass down the energy from the largest to the smallest without dissipation. Some literatures do not consider Taylor microscales as a characteristic length scale and consider the energy cascade to contain only the largest and smallest scales; while the latter accommodate both the inertial subrange and the viscous sublayer. Nevertheless, Taylor microscales are often used in describing the term "turbulence" more conveniently as these Taylor microscales play a dominant role in energy and momentum transfer in the wavenumber space.

Although it is possible to find some particular solutions of the Navier–Stokes equations governing fluid motion, all such solutions are unstable to finite perturbations at large Reynolds numbers. Sensitive dependence on the initial and boundary conditions makes fluid flow irregular both in time and in space so that a statistical description is needed. The Russian mathematician Andrey Kolmogorov proposed the first statistical theory of turbulence, based on the aforementioned notion of the energy cascade (an idea originally introduced by Richardson) and the concept of self-similarity. As a result, the Kolmogorov microscales were named after him. It is now known that the self-similarity is broken so the statistical description is presently modified.

A complete description of turbulence is one of the unsolved problems in physics. According to an apocryphal story, Werner Heisenberg was asked what he would ask God, given the opportunity. His reply was: "When I meet God, I am going to ask him two questions: Why relativity? And why turbulence? I really believe he will have an answer for the first." (Note: The story has also been attributed to John von Neumann, Arnold Sommerfeld, Theodore von Kármán, and Albert Einstein.) A similar witticism has been attributed to Horace Lamb in a speech to the British Association for the Advancement of Science: "I am an old man now, and when I die and go to heaven there are two matters on which I hope for enlightenment. One is quantum electrodynamics, and the other is the turbulent motion of fluids. And about the former I am rather more optimistic."

== Onset of turbulence ==
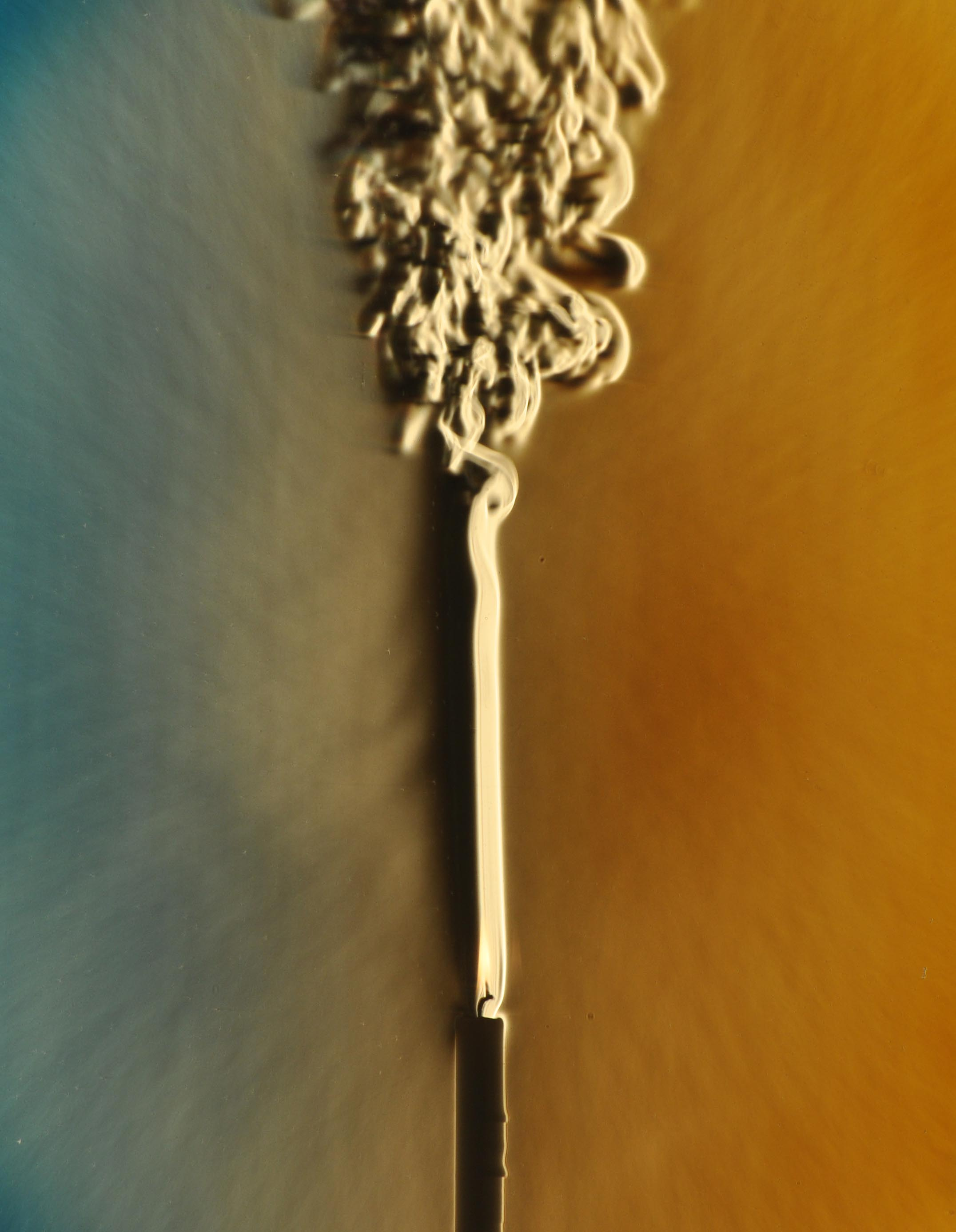
The plume from this candle flame goes from laminar to turbulent. The Reynolds number can be used to predict where this transition will take place

The onset of turbulence can be, to some extent, predicted by the Reynolds number, which is the ratio of inertial forces to viscous forces within a fluid which is subject to relative internal movement due to different fluid velocities, in what is known as a boundary layer in the case of a bounding surface such as the interior of a pipe. A similar effect is created by the introduction of a stream of higher velocity fluid, such as the hot gases from a flame in air. This relative movement generates fluid friction, which is a factor in developing turbulent flow. Counteracting this effect is the viscosity of the fluid, which as it increases, progressively inhibits turbulence, as more kinetic energy is absorbed by a more viscous fluid. The Reynolds number quantifies the relative importance of these two types of forces for given flow conditions, and is a guide to when turbulent flow will occur in a particular situation.

This ability to predict the onset of turbulent flow is an important design tool for equipment such as piping systems or aircraft wings, but the Reynolds number is also used in scaling of fluid dynamics problems, and is used to determine dynamic similitude between two different cases of fluid flow, such as between a model aircraft, and its full size version. Such scaling is not always linear and the application of Reynolds numbers to both situations allows scaling factors to be developed. A flow situation in which the kinetic energy is significantly absorbed due to the action of fluid molecular viscosity gives rise to a laminar flow regime. For this the dimensionless quantity the Reynolds number (Re) is used as a guide.

Reynolds number dependency. From top to bottom: regime of unseparated flow; a fixed pair of Foppl vortices in the wake; two laminar vortex street regimes; transition to turbulent vortex street; laminar boundary layer transitions to turbulence, disorganized wake; re-establishment of turbulent vortex …

With respect to laminar and turbulent flow regimes:

- laminar flow occurs at low Reynolds numbers, where viscous forces are dominant, and is characterized by smooth, constant fluid motion;
- turbulent flow occurs at high Reynolds numbers and is dominated by inertial forces, which tend to produce chaotic eddies, vortices and other flow instabilities.

The Reynolds number is defined as

$$\mathrm{Re} = \frac{\rho v L}{\mu} \,,$$

where:

- ρ is the density of the fluid (SI units: kg/m^{3})
- v is a characteristic velocity of the fluid with respect to the object (m/s)
- L is a characteristic linear dimension (m)
- μ is the dynamic viscosity of the fluid (Pa·s or N·s/m^{2} or kg/(m·s)).

While there is no theorem directly relating the non-dimensional Reynolds number to turbulence, flows at Reynolds numbers larger than 5000 are typically (but not necessarily) turbulent, while those at low Reynolds numbers usually remain laminar. In Poiseuille flow, for example, turbulence can first be sustained if the Reynolds number is larger than a critical value of about 2040; moreover, the turbulence is generally interspersed with laminar flow until a larger Reynolds number of about 4000.

The transition occurs if the size of the object is gradually increased, or the viscosity of the fluid is decreased, or if the density of the fluid is increased.

== Heat and momentum transfer ==
When flow is turbulent, particles exhibit additional transverse motion which enhances the rate of energy and momentum exchange between them, thus increasing the heat transfer and the friction coefficient.

Assume for a two-dimensional turbulent flow that one was able to locate a specific point in the fluid and measure the actual flow velocity v = (v_{x},v_{y}) of every particle that passed through that point at any given time. Then one would find the actual flow velocity fluctuating about a mean value:

$$v_x = \underbrace{\overline{v}_x}_\text{mean value} + \underbrace{v'_x}_\text{fluctuation} \quad \text{and} \quad v_y=\overline{v}_y + v'_y \,;$$

and similarly for temperature (T = T̅ + T′) and pressure (P = P̅ + P′), where the primed quantities denote fluctuations superposed to the mean. This decomposition of a flow variable into a mean value and a turbulent fluctuation was originally proposed by Osborne Reynolds in 1895, and is considered to be the beginning of the systematic mathematical analysis of turbulent flow, as a sub-field of fluid dynamics. While the mean values are taken as predictable variables determined by dynamics laws, the turbulent fluctuations are regarded as stochastic variables.

The heat flux and momentum transfer (represented by the shear stress τ) in the direction normal to the flow for a given time are

$$\begin{align}
q&=\underbrace{v'_y \rho c_P T'}_\text{experimental value} = -k_\text{turb}\frac{\partial \overline{T}}{\partial y} \,; \\
\tau &=\underbrace{-\rho \overline{v'_y v'_x}}_\text{experimental value} = \mu_\text{turb}\frac{\partial \overline{v}_x}{\partial y} \,;
\end{align}$$

where c_{P} is the heat capacity at constant pressure, ρ is the density of the fluid, μ_{turb} is the coefficient of turbulent viscosity and k_{turb} is the turbulent thermal conductivity.

== Kolmogorov's theory of 1941 ==
Richardson's notion of turbulence was that a turbulent flow is composed by "eddies" of different sizes. The sizes define a characteristic length scale for the eddies, which are also characterized by flow velocity scales and time scales (turnover time) dependent on the length scale. The large eddies are unstable and eventually break up originating smaller eddies, and the kinetic energy of the initial large eddy is divided into the smaller eddies that stemmed from it. These smaller eddies undergo the same process, giving rise to even smaller eddies which inherit the energy of their predecessor eddy, and so on. In this way, the energy is passed down from the large scales of the motion to smaller scales until reaching a sufficiently small length scale such that the viscosity of the fluid can effectively dissipate the kinetic energy into internal energy.

In his original theory of 1941, Kolmogorov postulated that for very high Reynolds numbers, the small-scale turbulent motions are statistically isotropic (i.e. no preferential spatial direction could be discerned). In general, the large scales of a flow are not isotropic, since they are determined by the particular geometrical features of the boundaries (the size characterizing the large scales will be denoted as L). Kolmogorov's idea was that in the Richardson's energy cascade this geometrical and directional information is lost, while the scale is reduced, so that the statistics of the small scales has a universal character: they are the same for all turbulent flows when the Reynolds number is sufficiently high.

Thus, Kolmogorov introduced a second hypothesis: for very high Reynolds numbers the statistics of small scales are universally and uniquely determined by the kinematic viscosity ν and the rate of energy dissipation ε. With only these two parameters, the unique length that can be formed by dimensional analysis is

$$\eta = \left(\frac{\nu^3}{\varepsilon}\right)^{1/4} \,.$$

This is today known as the Kolmogorov length scale (see Kolmogorov microscales).

A turbulent flow is characterized by a hierarchy of scales through which the energy cascade takes place. Dissipation of kinetic energy takes place at scales of the order of Kolmogorov length η, while the input of energy into the cascade comes from the decay of the large scales, of order L. These two scales at the extremes of the cascade can differ by several orders of magnitude at high Reynolds numbers. In between there is a range of scales (each one with its own characteristic length r) that has formed at the expense of the energy of the large ones. These scales are very large compared with the Kolmogorov length, but still very small compared with the large scale of the flow (i.e. η ≪ r ≪ L). Since eddies in this range are much larger than the dissipative eddies that exist at Kolmogorov scales, kinetic energy is essentially not dissipated in this range, and it is merely transferred to smaller scales until viscous effects become important as the order of the Kolmogorov scale is approached. Within this range inertial effects are still much larger than viscous effects, and it is possible to assume that viscosity does not play a role in their internal dynamics (for this reason this range is called "inertial range").

Hence, a third hypothesis of Kolmogorov was that at very high Reynolds number the statistics of scales in the range η ≪ r ≪ L are universally and uniquely determined by the scale r and the rate of energy dissipation ε.

The way in which the kinetic energy is distributed over the multiplicity of scales is a fundamental characterization of a turbulent flow. For homogeneous turbulence (i.e., statistically invariant under translations of the reference frame) this is usually done by means of the energy spectrum function E(k), where k is the modulus of the wavevector corresponding to some harmonics in a Fourier representation of the flow velocity field u(x):

$$\mathbf{u}(\mathbf{x}) = \iiint_{\mathbb{R}^3} \hat{\mathbf{u}}(\mathbf{k})e^{i \mathbf{k \cdot x}} \, \mathrm{d}^3\mathbf{k} \,,$$

where û(k) is the Fourier transform of the flow velocity field. Thus, E(k) dk represents the contribution to the kinetic energy from all the Fourier modes with k < |k| < k + dk, and therefore,

$$\tfrac12\left\langle u_i u_i \right\rangle = \int_0^\infty E(k) \, \mathrm{d}k \,,$$

where 1/2⟨u_{i}u_{i}⟩ is the mean turbulent kinetic energy of the flow. The wavenumber k corresponding to length scale r is k = 2π/r. Therefore, by dimensional analysis, the only possible form for the energy spectrum function according with the third Kolmogorov's hypothesis is

$$E(k) = K_0 \varepsilon^\frac23 k^{-\frac53} \,,$$

where $K_0 \approx 1.5$ would be a universal constant. This is one of the most famous results of Kolmogorov 1941 theory, describing transport of energy through scale space without any loss or gain. The Kolmogorov five-thirds law was first observed in a tidal channel, and considerable experimental evidence has since accumulated that supports it.

Outside of the inertial area, one can find the formula below :

$$E(k) = K_0 \varepsilon^\frac23 k^{-\frac53} \exp \left[ - \frac{3 K_0}{2} \left( \frac{\nu^3 k^4}{\varepsilon} \right)^{\frac13}  \right] \,,$$

In spite of this success, Kolmogorov theory is at present under revision. This theory implicitly assumes that the turbulence is statistically self-similar at different scales. This essentially means that the statistics are scale-invariant and non-intermittent in the inertial range. A usual way of studying turbulent flow velocity fields is by means of flow velocity increments:

$$\delta \mathbf{u}(r) = \mathbf{u}(\mathbf{x} + \mathbf{r}) - \mathbf{u}(\mathbf{x}) \,;$$

that is, the difference in flow velocity between points separated by a vector r (since the turbulence is assumed isotropic, the flow velocity increment depends only on the modulus of r). Flow velocity increments are useful because they emphasize the effects of scales of the order of the separation r when statistics are computed. The statistical scale-invariance without intermittency implies that the scaling of flow velocity increments should occur with a unique scaling exponent β, so that when r is scaled by a factor λ,

$$\delta \mathbf{u}(\lambda r)$$

should have the same statistical distribution as

$$\lambda^\beta \delta \mathbf{u}(r)\,,$$

with β independent of the scale r. From this fact, and other results of Kolmogorov 1941 theory, it follows that the statistical moments of the flow velocity increments (known as structure functions in turbulence) should scale as

$$\Big\langle \big ( \delta \mathbf{u}(r)\big )^n \Big\rangle = C_n \langle (\varepsilon r )^\frac{n}{3} \rangle \,,$$

where the brackets denote the statistical average, and the C_{n} would be universal constants.

There is considerable evidence that turbulent flows deviate from this behavior. The scaling exponents deviate from the n/3 value predicted by the theory, becoming a non-linear function of the order n of the structure function. The universality of the constants have also been questioned. For low orders the discrepancy with the Kolmogorov n/3 value is very small, which explain the success of Kolmogorov theory in regards to low order statistical moments. In particular, it can be shown that when the energy spectrum follows a power law

$$E(k) \propto k^{-p} \,,$$

with 1 < p < 3, the second order structure function has also a power law, with the form

$$\Big\langle \big (\delta \mathbf{u}(r)\big )^2 \Big\rangle \propto r^{p-1} \,,$$

Since the experimental values obtained for the second order structure function only deviate slightly from the 2/3 value predicted by Kolmogorov theory, the value for p is very near to 5/3 (differences are about 2%). Thus the "Kolmogorov −5/3 spectrum" is generally observed in turbulence. However, for high order structure functions, the difference with the Kolmogorov scaling is significant, and the breakdown of the statistical self-similarity is clear. This behavior, and the lack of universality of the C_{n} constants, are related with the phenomenon of intermittency in turbulence and can be related to the non-trivial scaling behavior of the dissipation rate averaged over scale r. This is an important area of research in this field, and a major goal of the modern theory of turbulence is to understand what is universal in the inertial range, and how to deduce intermittency properties from the Navier-Stokes equations, i.e. from first principles.

== See also ==
- Astronomical seeing
- Atmospheric dispersion modeling
- Chaos theory
- Clear-air turbulence
- Different types of boundary conditions in fluid dynamics
- Eddy covariance
- Fluid dynamics
  - Darcy–Weisbach equation
  - Eddy
  - Navier–Stokes equations
  - Large eddy simulation
  - Hagen–Poiseuille equation
  - Kelvin–Helmholtz instability
  - Lagrangian coherent structure
  - Turbulence kinetic energy
- Magnetohydrodynamic turbulence
- Mesocyclones
- Navier–Stokes existence and smoothness
- Swing bowling
- Taylor microscale
- Turbulence modeling
- Velocimetry
- Vertical draft
- Vortex
- Vortex generator
- Wake turbulence
- Wave turbulence
- Wingtip vortices
- Wind tunnel
