= Krivine–Stengle Positivstellensatz =

Theorem of real algebraic geometry

In real algebraic geometry, Krivine–Stengle Positivstellensatz (German for "positive-locus-theorem") characterizes polynomials that are positive on a semialgebraic set, which is defined by systems of inequalities of polynomials with real coefficients, or more generally, coefficients from any real closed field.

It can be thought of as a real analogue of Hilbert's Nullstellensatz (which concern complex zeros of polynomial ideals), and this analogy is at the origin of its name. It was proved by French mathematician Jean-Louis Krivine and then rediscovered by the Canadian Gilbert Stengle.

== Statement ==
Let R be a real closed field, and F = {f_{1}, f_{2}, ..., f_{m}} and G = {g_{1}, g_{2}, ..., g_{r}} finite sets of polynomials over R in n variables. Let W be the semialgebraic set

$$W=\{x\in R^n\mid\forall f\in F,\,f(x)\ge0;\, \forall g\in G,\,g(x)=0\},$$

and define the preorder (in the sense of a prepositive cone) associated with W as the set

$$P(F,G) = \left\{ \sum_{\alpha \in \{0,1\}^m} \sigma_\alpha f_1^{\alpha_1} \cdots f_m^{\alpha_m} + \sum_{\ell=1}^r \varphi_\ell g_\ell : \sigma_\alpha \in \Sigma^2[X_1,\ldots,X_n];\  \varphi_\ell \in R[X_1,\ldots,X_n] \right\}$$

where Σ^{2}[X_{1},...,X_{n}] is the set of sum-of-squares polynomials. In other words, P(F, G) = C + I, where C is the cone generated by F (i.e., the subsemiring of R[X_{1},...,X_{n}] generated by F and arbitrary squares) and I is the ideal generated by G.

Let p ∈ R[X_{1},...,X_{n}] be a polynomial. Krivine–Stengle Positivstellensatz states that

(i) $\forall x\in W\;p(x)\ge 0$ if and only if $\exists q_1,q_2\in P(F,G)$ and $s \in \mathbb{Z}$ such that $q_1 p = p^{2s} + q_2$.
(ii) $\forall x\in W\;p(x)>0$ if and only if $\exists q_1,q_2\in P(F,G)$ such that $q_1 p = 1 + q_2$.

The weak Positivstellensatz is the following variant of the Positivstellensatz. Let R be a real closed field, and F, G, and H finite subsets of R[X_{1},...,X_{n}]. Let C be the cone generated by F, and I the ideal generated by G. Then

$$\{x\in R^n\mid\forall f\in F\,f(x)\ge0\land\forall g\in G\,g(x)=0\land\forall h\in H\,h(x)\ne0\}=\emptyset$$

if and only if

$$\exists f \in C,g \in I,n \in \mathbb{N}\; f+g+\left(\prod H\right)^{\!2n} = 0.$$

(Unlike Nullstellensatz, the "weak" form actually includes the "strong" form as a special case, so the terminology is a misnomer.)

== Variants ==
The Krivine–Stengle Positivstellensatz also has the following refinements under additional assumptions. It should be remarked that Schmüdgen's Positivstellensatz has a weaker assumption than Putinar's Positivstellensatz, but the conclusion is also weaker.

=== Schmüdgen's Positivstellensatz ===
Suppose that $R = \mathbb{R}$. If the semialgebraic set $W=\{x\in \mathbb{R}^n\mid\forall f\in F,\,f(x)\ge0\}$ is compact, then each polynomial $p \in \mathbb{R}[X_1, \dots, X_n]$ that is strictly positive on $W$ can be written as a polynomial in the defining functions of $W$ with sums-of-squares coefficients, i.e. $p \in P(F, \emptyset)$. Here P is said to be strictly positive on $W$ if $p(x)>0$ for all $x \in W$. Note that Schmüdgen's Positivstellensatz is stated for $R = \mathbb{R}$ and does not hold for arbitrary real closed fields.

=== Putinar's Positivstellensatz ===
Define the quadratic module associated with W as the set

$$Q(F,G) = \left\{ \sigma_0 + \sum_{j=1}^m \sigma_j f_j + \sum_{\ell=1}^r \varphi_\ell g_\ell : \sigma_j \in \Sigma^2 [X_1,\ldots,X_n];\  \varphi_\ell \in \mathbb{R}[X_1,\ldots,X_n] \right\}$$

Assume there exists L > 0 such that the polynomial $L - \sum_{i=1}^n x_i^2 \in Q(F,G).$ If $p(x)>0$ for all $x \in W$, then p ∈ Q(F,G).

== See also ==
- Positive polynomial for other positivstellensatz theorems.
- Real Nullstellensatz
