= Polynomial SOS =

In mathematics, a form (i.e. a homogeneous polynomial) h(x) of degree 2m in the real n-dimensional vector x is sum of squares of forms (SOS) if and only if there exist forms $g_1(x),\ldots,g_k(x)$ of degree m such that
$$h(x) = \sum_{i=1}^k g_i(x)^2 .$$

Every form that is SOS is also a positive polynomial, although the converse is not always true in general. In the special cases of n = 2 and 2m = 2, or n = 3 and 2m = 4, Hilbert proved that a form is SOS if and only if it is positive. The same is also true for the analogous problem with positive symmetric forms.

Although not every form is SOS, there are efficiently testable sufficient conditions for a form to be SOS. Moreover, every real nonnegative form can be approximated as closely as desired (in the $l_1$-norm of its coefficient vector) by a sequence of forms $\{f_\epsilon\}$ that are SOS.

== Square matricial representation (SMR) ==
To establish whether a form h(x) is SOS amounts to solving a convex optimization problem. Indeed, any h(x) can be written as
$$h(x) = (x^{\{m\}})^{T}\left(H+L(\alpha)\right)x^{\{m\}}$$
where $x^{\{m\}}$ is a vector containing a basis for the space of forms of degree m in x (such as all monomials of degree m), H is any symmetric matrix satisfying $h(x) = (x^{\left\{m\right\}})^{T}Hx^{\{m\}}$, and $L(\alpha)$ is a linear parameterization of the linear subspace
$$\mathcal{L} = \left\{L=L':~x^{\{m\}'} L x^{\{m\}}=0\right\}.$$

The dimension of the vector $x^{\{m\}}$ is given by
$$\sigma(n,m) = \binom{n+m-1}{m},$$
whereas the dimension of the vector $\alpha$ is given by
$$\omega(n,2m) = \frac{1}{2}\sigma(n,m)\left(1+\sigma(n,m)\right)-\sigma(n,2m).$$

The polynomial h(x) is SOS if and only if there exists a vector $\alpha$ such that $H + L(\alpha)$ is a positive-semidefinite matrix. This is a linear matrix inequality (LMI), and the existence of $\alpha$ is a convex feasibility problem.

The expression $h(x)=x^{\{m\}'}\left(H+L(\alpha)\right)x^{\{m\}}$ was introduced with the name square matricial representation (SMR) in order to establish whether a form is SOS via an LMI. The matrix $H + L(\alpha)$ is also known as a Gram matrix.

=== Examples ===
- Consider $m = 2$ and the form $h(x)=x_1^4-x_1^2x_2^2+x_2^4$ of degree 4 in two variables. We have
  $$x^{\{m\}} = \begin{pmatrix} x_1^2\\x_1x_2\\x_2^2\end{pmatrix}\!,
~H+L(\alpha) = \begin{pmatrix}
1&0&-\alpha_1\\0&-1+2\alpha_1&0\\-\alpha_1&0&1
\end{pmatrix}\!.$$
  Since there exists α such that $H+L(\alpha)\ge 0$, namely $\alpha=1$, it follows that h(x) is SOS.
- Consider $m = 2$ and the form $h(x)=2x_1^4-5x_1^3x_2/2+x_1^2x_2x_3-2x_1x_3^3+5x_2^4+x_3^4$ of degree 4 in three variables. We have
  $$x^{\{m\}}=\begin{pmatrix}x_1^2\\x_1x_2\\x_1x_3\\x_2^2\\x_2x_3\\x_3^2\end{pmatrix},
~H+L(\alpha) = \begin{pmatrix}
2&-5/4&0&-\alpha_1&-\alpha_2&-\alpha_3\\
-5/4&2\alpha_1&1/2+\alpha_2&0&-\alpha_4&-\alpha_5\\
0&1/2+\alpha_2&2\alpha_3&\alpha_4&\alpha_5&-1\\
-\alpha_1&0&\alpha_4&5&0&-\alpha_6\\
-\alpha_2&-\alpha_4&\alpha_5&0&2\alpha_6&0\\
-\alpha_3&-\alpha_5&-1&-\alpha_6&0&1
\end{pmatrix}.$$
  Since $H+L(\alpha)\ge 0$ for $\alpha=(1.18,-0.43,0.73,1.13,-0.37,0.57)$, it follows that h(x) is SOS.

== Generalizations and analogs ==
=== Matrix SOS ===
A matrix form F(x) (i.e., a matrix whose entries are forms) of dimension r and degree 2m in the real n-dimensional vector x is SOS if and only if there exist matrix forms $G_1(x),\ldots,G_k(x)$ of degree m such that
$$F(x)=\sum_{i=1}^k G_i(x)^{T}G_i(x) .$$

==== Matrix SMR ====
To establish whether a matrix form F(x) is SOS amounts to solving a convex optimization problem. Indeed, similarly to the scalar case any F(x) can be written according to the SMR as
$$F(x) = \left(x^{\{m\}}\otimes I_r\right)^{T}\left(H+L(\alpha)\right)\left(x^{\{m\}}\otimes I_r\right)$$
where $\otimes$ is the Kronecker product of matrices, H is any symmetric matrix satisfying
$$F(x) = \left(x^{\{m\}}\otimes I_r\right)^{T}H\left(x^{\{m\}}\otimes I_r\right)$$
and $L(\alpha)$ is a linear parameterization of the linear space
$$\mathcal{L}=\left\{L=L^{T}:~\left(x^{\{m\}}\otimes I_r\right)^{T}L\left(x^{\{m\}}\otimes I_r\right)=0\right\}.$$

The dimension of the vector $\alpha$ is given by
$$\omega(n,2m,r)=\frac{1}{2}r\left(\sigma(n,m)\left(r\sigma(n,m)+1\right)-(r+1)\sigma(n,2m)\right).$$

Then, F(x) is SOS if and only if there exists a vector $\alpha$ such that the following LMI holds:
$$H+L(\alpha) \ge 0.$$

The expression $F(x) = \left(x^{\{m\}}\otimes I_r\right)^{T}\left(H+L(\alpha)\right)\left(x^{\{m\}}\otimes I_r\right)$ was introduced in order to establish whether a matrix form is SOS via an LMI.

=== Noncommutative polynomial SOS ===
Consider the free algebra R⟨X⟩ generated by the n noncommuting letters X = (X_{1}, ..., X_{n}) and equipped with the involution ^{T}, such that ^{T} fixes R and X_{1}, ..., X_{n} and reverses words formed by X_{1}, ..., X_{n}. We consider Hermitian noncommutative polynomials f, which are the noncommutative polynomials of the form f = f^{T}. When evaluating a Hermitian noncommutative polynomial f on any n-tuple of real matrices of any size r × r produces in a positive semi-definite matrix, f is said to be matrix-positive.

A noncommutative polynomial is SOS if there exists noncommutative polynomials $h_1,\ldots,h_k$ such that
$$f(X) = \sum_{i=1}^{k} h_i(X)^T h_i(X).$$

Surprisingly, in the noncommutative scenario a noncommutative polynomial is SOS if and only if it is matrix-positive. Moreover, there exist algorithms available to decompose matrix-positive polynomials in sum of squares of noncommutative polynomials.

=== Polynomial HSOS ===
A complex polynomial $p(z_1, \dots, z_n)$ in variables $z_1, \dots, z_n$ and their conjugates $z_1^*, \dots, z_n^*$ is Hermitian if it takes on only real values, or equivalently if each term has an equal number of conjugated and un-conjugated variables. It is a hermitian sum-of-squares (HSOS) if there are complex polynomials $g_1, \dots, g_k$, in only the un-conjugated variables $z_1, \dots, z_n$, such that
$$p(z) = \sum _{i = 1} ^{k} g_i^*(z)g_i(z).$$
A Hermitian square matricial representation of $p$ is a matrix $M$ such that $p(z) = (z^{\{m\}})^{*}Mz^{\{m\}}$, where $(z^{\{m\}})^{*}$ is the Hermitian transpose of the vector $z^{\{m\}}$. As first observed by Putinar, there is a choice of the matrix $M$ having certain symmetry properties, which is in fact unique and can be written explicitly. Thus testing if a Hermitian polynomial is HSOS of degree $m$ can be done by testing if a single, fixed matrix is positive-semidefinite.

== See also ==
- Sum-of-squares optimization
- Positive polynomial
- Hilbert's seventeenth problem
- SOS-convexity
