= Pablo Parrilo =

Academic background
- Education: University of Buenos Aires (BS); California Institute of Technology (PhD)
- Thesis: Structured semidefinite programs and semialgebraic geometry methods in robustness and optimization (2000)
- Doctoral advisor: John Doyle

Academic work
- Discipline: Electrical engineering
- Sub-discipline: Dynamical systems · control systems
- Institutions: Massachusetts Institute of Technology

Pablo A. Parrilo is an Argentinian academic working as the Joseph F. and Nancy P. Keithley Professor of Electrical Engineering and Computer Science at the Massachusetts Institute of Technology.

== Education ==
Parrilo earned a Bachelor of Science degree in electronic engineering at the University of Buenos Aires and earned a PhD in control and dynamical systems from the California Institute of Technology. After earning his PhD, he remained at CalTech as a postdoctoral scholar.

== Career ==
From 2001 to 2004, Parrilo worked as an assistant professor of analysis and control systems at ETH Zurich. He joined the Massachusetts Institute of Technology in 2004 as an associate professor and has since worked as a full professor in the Department of Electrical Engineering and Computer Science and associate director of the MIT Laboratory for Information and Decision Systems. He has held visiting appointments at the University of California, Santa Barbara; University of California, Berkeley; and Faculty of Engineering, Lund University.

In 2011 Parrillo was awareded the IEEE Control Systems Society Antonio Ruberti Young Researcher Prize "For fundamental contributions to optimization theory and its applications".

Parrilo was named Fellow of the Institute of Electrical and Electronics Engineers (IEEE) in 2016 for contributions to semidefinite and sum-of-squares optimization. He was named a SIAM Fellow in 2018.
