= Positive polynomial =

In mathematics, a positive polynomial (respectively non-negative polynomial) on a particular set is a polynomial whose values are positive (respectively non-negative) on that set. Precisely, Let $p$ be a polynomial in $n$ variables with real coefficients and let $S$ be a subset of the $n$-dimensional Euclidean space $\mathbb{R}^n$. We say that:

- $p$ is positive on $S$ if $p(x)>0$ for every $x$ in $S$.
- $p$ is non-negative on $S$ if $p(x)\ge 0$ for every $x$ in $S$.

== Positivstellensatz and nichtnegativstellensatz ==
For certain sets $S$, there exist algebraic descriptions of all polynomials that are positive (resp. non-negative) on $S$. Such a description is a positivstellensatz (resp. nichtnegativstellensatz). The importance of Positivstellensatz theorems in computation arises from its ability to transform problems of polynomial optimization into semidefinite programming problems, which can be efficiently solved using convex optimization techniques. In the Hermitian case, Putinar observed that the resulting semidefinite programming problems converge asymptotically and reduce to calculating the largest eigenvalues of explicitly given matrices, which can be solved more efficiently than general semidefinite programming problems.

== Examples ==
=== Positive polynomials on Euclidean space ===
A real univariate polynomial is non-negative on $\mathbb{R}$ if and only if it is a sum of two squares of real univariate polynomials. This equivalence does not generalize to multivariate polynomials, which was originally shown by Hilbert. An explicit example of such a polynomial was not known until Theodore Motzkin showed in 1967 that $X^4Y^2+X^2Y^4-3X^2Y^2+1$ is not a sum of squares of polynomials but is non-negative on $\mathbb{R}^2$, which follows from the AM-GM inequality.

In higher dimensions, a real polynomial in $n$ variables is non-negative on $\mathbb{R}^n$ if and only if it is a sum of squares of real rational functions in $n$ variables. This was originally posed as Hilbert's seventeenth problem in 1900, and later solved by Emil Artin in 1927.

For homogeneous polynomials, more information can be determined about the denominator. Suppose that $p\in\mathbb{R}[X_1,\dots,X_n]$ is homogeneous of degree 2k. If it is positive on $\mathbb{R}^n\setminus\{0\}$, then there exists an integer $m$ such that $(X_1^2+\cdots+X_n^2)^mp$ is a sum of squares of homogeneous polynomials of degree $m + 2k$.

=== Positive polynomials on polytopes ===
For polynomials of degree${}\le 1$ we have the following variant of Farkas lemma: If $f,g_1,\dots,g_k$ have degree${}\le 1$ and $f(x)\ge 0$ for every $x\in\mathbb{R}^n$ satisfying $g_1(x)\ge 0,\dots,g_k(x)\ge 0$, then there exist non-negative real numbers $c_0,c_1,\dots,c_k$ such that $f=c_0+c_1g_1+\cdots+c_kg_k$.

For higher degree polynomials on the simplex, Pólya showed that if $p\in\mathbb{R}[X_1,\dots,X_n]$ is homogeneous and positive on the set $\{x\in\mathbb{R}^n\mid x_1\ge 0,\dots,x_n\ge 0,x_1+\cdots+x_n\ne 0\}$, then there exists an integer $m$ such that $(x_1+\cdots+x_n)^mp$ has non-negative coefficients.

For higher degree polynomials on general compact polytopes, we have Handelman's theorem: If $K$ is a compact polytope in Euclidean $d$-space, defined by linear inequalities $g_i\ge 0$, and if $f$ is a polynomial in $d$ variables that is positive on $K$, then $f$ can be expressed as a linear combination with non-negative coefficients of products of members of $\{g_i\}$.

=== Positive polynomials on semialgebraic sets ===
For general semialgebraic sets, the most general result is Stengle's Positivstellensatz.

For compact semialgebraic sets we have Schmüdgen's positivstellensatz, Putinar's positivstellensatz and Vasilescu's positivstellensatz. In particular, no denominators are needed.

For sufficiently nice compact semialgebraic sets of low dimension, there exists a nichtnegativstellensatz without denominators.

=== Positive Hermitian polynomials ===
A polynomial $p$ in complex variables $z_1, \dots, z_n$ and their conjugates $z_1^*, \dots, z_n^*$ is Hermitian if it takes on only real values for all choices of $z$. It is a hermitian sum-of-squares (HSOS) if it can be written as
$$p = \sum _{i = 1} ^{k} g_i^*g_i$$
for some polynomials $g_1, \dots, g_k$ in only the variables $z_1, \dots, z_n$. A result due to Quillen states that any strictly positive, homogeneous Hermitian polynomial is a Hermitian sum-of-squares of rational functions whose denominator is the squared norm $z_1^*z_1 + \dots + z_n^*z_n$. This was later generalized by Putinar to a much larger class of spaces, including all complex projective varieties. In the Hermitian case the Hermitian sum-of-squares representation is unique if it exists and can be found by diagonalizing an explicitly given Hermitian matrix, which was first observed by Putinar.

== Generalizations of positivstellensatz ==
Positivstellensatz also exist for signomials, trigonometric polynomials, polynomial matrices, polynomials in free variables, quantum polynomials, and definable functions on o-minimal structures.

== See also ==
- Polynomial SOS
- Positivstellensatz
- Sum-of-squares optimization
- Hilbert's seventeenth problem
- Hilbert's Nullstellensatz for algebraic descriptions of polynomials that are zero on a set S.
