= Dunsink =

Townland near Dublin, Ireland

Dunsink Dún Sinche
- Townland
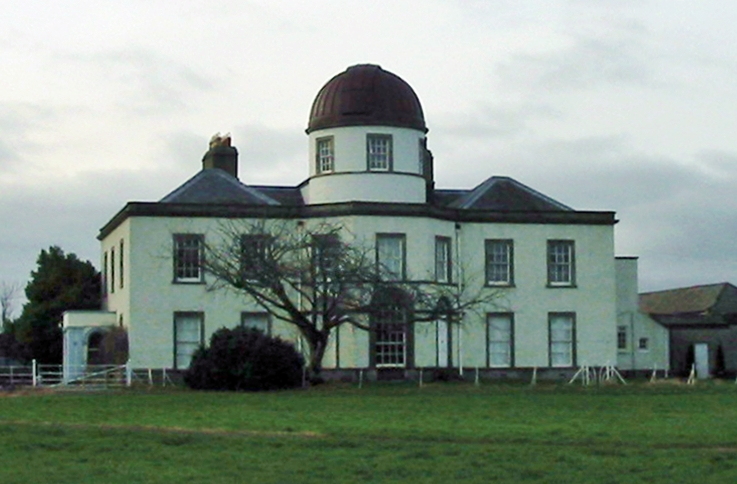
- Dunsink Observatory

- Location in Ireland
- Coordinates: 53°23′14″N 6°20′19″W
- Country: Ireland
- Province: Leinster
- County: Dublin

Government
  - Local Authority: Fingal County Council
  - Dáil Éireann: Dublin North-West
- Time zone: UTC+0 (WET)
  - Summer (DST): UTC-1 (IST (WEST))

Dunsink (Irish: Dún Sinche, meaning 'fort of Sineach') is a townland in the civil parish of Castleknock, Dublin, in Ireland. The townland has an area of approximately 1.7 square kilometres (0.66 sq mi), and had a population of 323 people as of the 2011 census. It is around 7 km north-west of the city centre, near the junction of the N3 and the M50 roads.

The townland is the site of Dunsink Observatory, where William Rowan Hamilton and Hermann Brück were directors. Built in 1783–1785, it is the oldest scientific institution in Ireland. The observatory houses a 12-inch (30 cm) refracting telescope which was built by Grubbs of Dublin using a French manufactured lens. It is situated on a hill 8 km northwest of Dublin's city centre, where the astronomy section of the School of Cosmic Physics in the Dublin Institute for Advanced Studies is located.

The 1880 Definition of Time Act set the official time in Ireland to be Dublin Mean Time. This was computed as the time at Dunsink, which was about GMT-25m21. In 1916, another act moved Ireland to Greenwich Mean Time. Dunsink time is mentioned five times in James Joyce's novel, Ulysses.

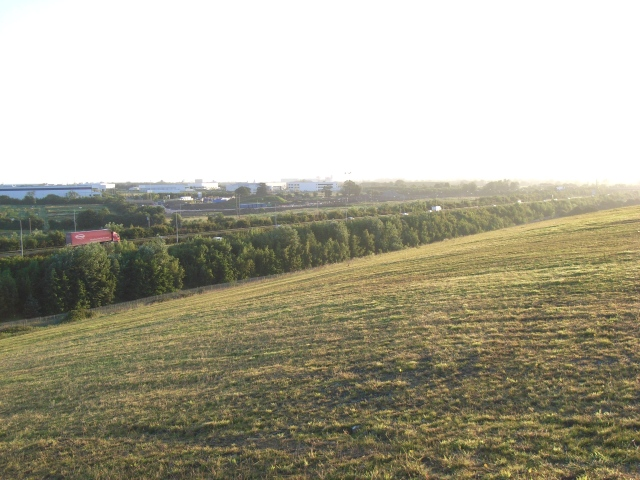
Former landfill site at Dunsink

Formerly the location of "Dublin's biggest landfill facility", Dunsink is also the site of a major unofficial Traveller encampment, the subject of considerable media coverage in 2007. By 2008, Fingal County Council had reportedly compensated those in the encampment to "vacate [the] land".

The council's updated Fingal Development Plan 2023-2029 includes proposals to build several thousand new homes at Dunsink. The proposal, which was opened for public consultation in mid-2026, attracted objections from some residents in nearby Finglas.
