= Luke Drury (astrophysicist) =

Irish mathematician and astrophysicist

Emeritus Professor Luke O’Connor Drury MRIA MAE FInstP
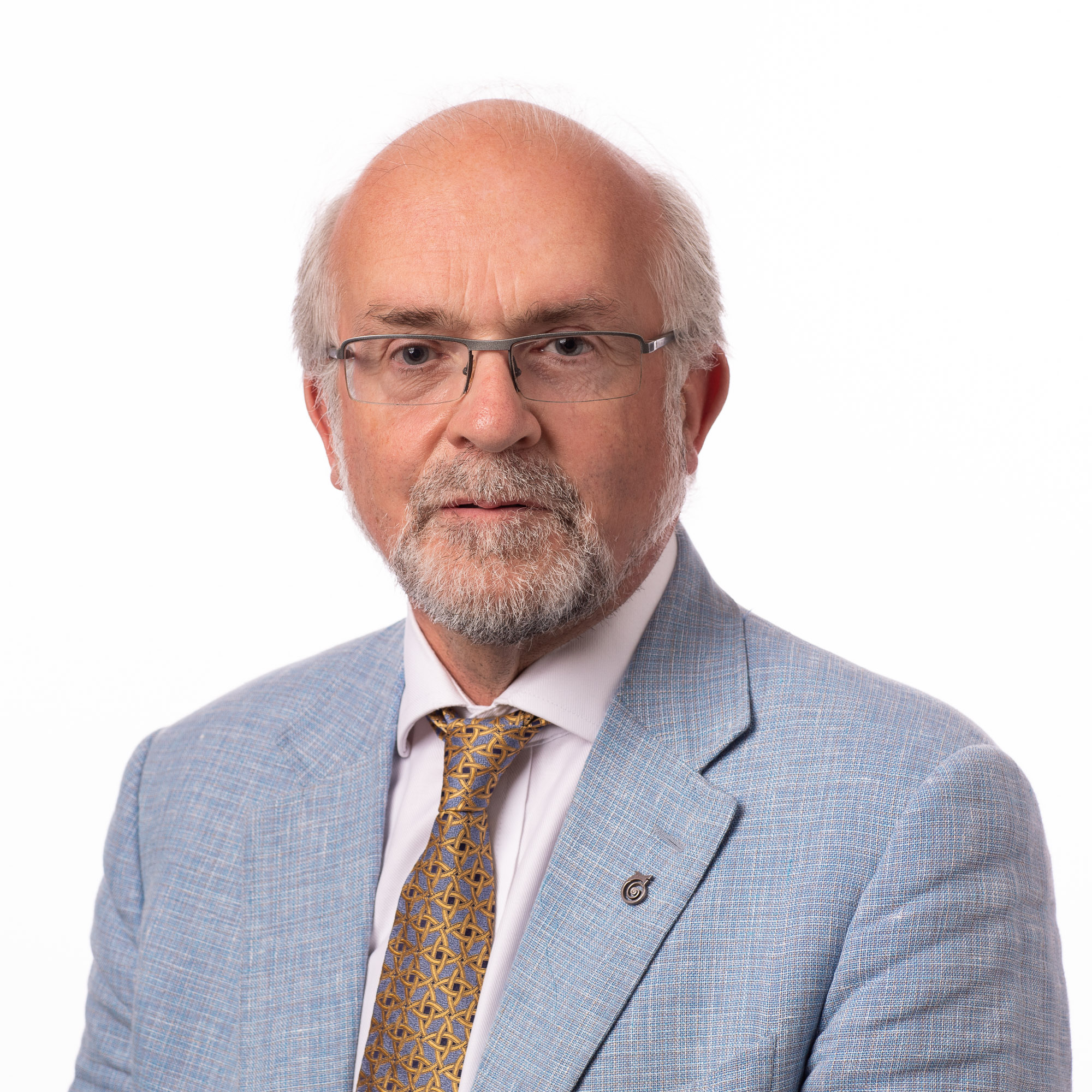
- Drury in 2018
- Education: Wesley College Dublin
- Alma mater: Trinity College Dublin (BA), University of Cambridge (PhD)
- Spouse: Dr Anna Drury
- Awards: Shakti P Duggal Award 1987
- Scientific career
- Workplaces: Max-Planck-Institut für Kernphysik, Heidelberg; Dublin Institute for Advanced Studies, School of Cosmic Physics

Luke O’Connor Drury (born 1953 in Dublin) is an Irish mathematician and astrophysicist at the Dublin Institute for Advanced Studies (DIAS) with research interests in plasma physics, particle acceleration, gas dynamics, shock waves, and cosmic rays. He was President of the Royal Irish Academy from 2011 to 2014.

== Education and career ==
Drury is a son of psychiatrist and philosopher Maurice O'Connor Drury.

In 1969, he won first place at the Aer Lingus Young Scientists’ exhibition, now called the BT Young Scientist and Technology Exhibition.

He was elected a scholar of Trinity College Dublin (TCD) in 1973 and got a BA (mod) in pure mathematics and experimental physics from TCD in 1975 and earned his Ph.D. in astrophysics from University of Cambridge in 1979, writing a thesis on "Some fluid dynamical problems in Astrophysics", supervised by John M. Stewart.

From 1980 to 1986, he worked at the Max Planck Institute for Nuclear Physics in Heidelberg with Professor H. J. Voelk.

In 1986, he returned to Dublin where he became Senior Professor in the School of Cosmic Physics and head of the then Cosmic Ray Section (now Astronomy and Astrophysics Section) at DIAS.

He served as interim Director of The Irish Centre for High-End Computing (ICHEC) in 2006.

From 1998 to 2019, he was Andrews Professor of Astronomy, an honorary chair at TCD. Between 2007 and 2018 he acted as director at the Dunsink Observatory and was head of Dublin Institute for Advanced Studies Astronomy & Astrophysics Section.

He was President of the Royal Irish Academy from 2011 to 2014.

Drury retired in 2018 but continues to work on issues of policy for science, in particular open access and open science, as a board member of the federation of All European Academies (ALLEA). He was the lead author on the ALLEA response to Plan S. In 2021 he was made an honorary fellow of Trinity College Dublin. In 2025, he was awarded the Ó Ceallaigh Medal by the IUPAP Cosmic Ray Commission for contributions to cosmic ray physics.

== Selected publications ==
- On normal modes of gas sheets and discs (1980) MNRAS 193 337
- An introduction to the theory of diffusive shock acceleration of energetic particles in tenuous plasmas (1983) Rep. Prog. Phys. 46 973.
- Simple adaptive grids for 1-D initial value problems (1987) J. Comp. Phys. 69 175 (with E. Dorf)
- The gamma-ray visibility of supernova remnants. A test of cosmic ray origin (1994) A&A 287 959 (with F. Aharonian and H. J. Voelk)
- Escaping the accelerator: how, when and in what numbers do cosmic rays get out of supernova remnants? (2011) MNRAS 415 1807
