= Henry Ussher (astronomer) =

Irish mathematician and astronomer

Henry Ussher (1741–1790) was an Irish mathematician and astronomer, best known as the inaugural Andrews Professor of Astronomy at Trinity College Dublin (TCD), a title later accompanied with the designation Royal Astronomer of Ireland. Ussher was a key player in the setting up of Dunsink Observatory outside the city of Dublin and was its first director.

== Life ==
Henry was the fourth son of Samuel Ussher, rector of Dunganstown, County Wicklow, by his wife Frances Walsh. Elected a Scholar of Trinity College Dublin in 1759, he graduated B.A. in 1761, M.A. in 1764, B.D. and D.D. in 1779. He was elected to a fellowship in 1764, and co-opted senior fellow in 1781. He was Donegall Lecturer in Mathematics at TCD 1769-1770.

Appointed on 22 Jan 1783, the first Andrews Professor of Astronomy, Ussher went to London to order instruments for the planned Dunsink Observatory from Jesse Ramsden. These included: a small achromatic lens telescope, mounted on a polar axis, and carried by a heliostatic movement; an equatorial machine with circles five feet in diameter; a transit of six feet focal length, and a ten-foot vertical circle executed, after delays, on a reduced scale. Ussher chose the site for the observatory at Dunsink near Dublin, planned the building, and supervised its construction.

Ussher's election as a fellow of the Royal Society of London on 24 November 1785 followed shortly after the incorporation of the Royal Irish Academy, of which he was an original member. He died at his house in Harcourt Street, Dublin, on 8 May 1790, and was buried in the college chapel.

== Works ==
Papers contributed by Ussher to the Transactions of the Royal Irish Academy included "Observations on the Disappearance and Reappearance of Saturn's Rings in the Year 1789". From the compression of the globe of Saturn, he deduced a rotation period for the planet of 10 hours 12½ minutes.

== Family ==
Ussher married Mary Burne, and left three sons and five daughters. The eldest son was Admiral Thomas Ussher.

== Notes ==
Attribution

This article incorporates text from a publication now in the public domain: Lee, Sidney, ed. (1899). "Ussher, Henry (d.1790)". Dictionary of National Biography. Vol. 58. London: Smith, Elder & Co.
