= Andrews Professor of Astronomy =

Professorship at Trinity College Dublin

The Andrews Professor of Astronomy is a chair in astronomy in Trinity College Dublin, that was established in 1783 in conjunction with the establishment of Dunsink Observatory in Dublin. From 1793, under letters patent of King George III, the Andrews Professor held the title Royal Astronomer of Ireland. Both titles fell vacant in 1921 but the professorship was revived in 1984.

Dunsink Observatory was founded in 1785 following a bequest by Francis Andrews, who died in 1774 while Provost of Trinity College. Andrews' bequest also funded the eponymous professorship, which was regulated by a new college statute requiring the professor to "make regular observations of the heavenly bodies ... and of the sun, moon and planets".

In 1921 Henry Crozier Keating Plummer left Trinity for the Royal Military Academy, Woolwich, resigning as Andrews Professor, Royal Astronomer, and Director of Dunsink Observatory. The civil disturbance and political upheaval of the period precluded filling the vacancy quickly. The title Royal Astronomer was never revived; Dunsink and its directorship passed in 1947 from Trinity College to the Dublin Institute for Advanced Studies; the Andrews Professorship was revived in 1984 as an honorary title in Trinity's School of Mathematics.

== List of the professors ==
- 1783–1790: Henry Ussher (1741–1790)
- 1790–1827: John Brinkley (1763–1835)
- 1827–1865: William R. Hamilton (1805–1865)
- 1865–1874: Franz Brünnow (1821–1891)
- 1874–1892: Robert Ball (1840–1913)
- 1892–1897: Arthur Rambaut (1859–923)
- 1897–1906: Charles Joly (1864–1906)
- 1906–1912: Edmund Whittaker (1873–1956)
- 1912–1921: Henry Plummer (1875–1946)
- 1921–1984: suspended
- 1984–1996: Patrick Wayman
- 1997: vacant
- 1998–2019: Luke Drury
- 2019–present: Luciano Rezzolla
