= Evert Meurs =

Dutch astronomer

Evert Johan Alexander Meurs (born in the Netherlands) is a Dutch astronomer at the University of Amsterdam and a former director of Dunsink Observatory in Dublin, Ireland. He spearheaded the efforts by Ireland's astronomers to become a member of the European Southern Observatory (ESO).

== Education and career ==
Meurs got an MSc at The University of Amsterdam in 1976 and a PhD at Leiden University in 1982. His doctoral thesis was "The Seyfert Galaxy Population: A Radio Survey; Luminosity Function; Related Objects" done under Harry van de Laan.

He has worked at a number of educational and research facilities including:

1982-1984: Postdoctoral researcher at Max Planck Institute (MPI) in Heidelberg
1984-1987: Postdoctoral researcher at Cambridge
1988, 1989 and 1993: Lectured for two months in each of these years at University of Porto
1987-1989: European Southern Observatory (ESO) in Garching
1989-1992: MPI in Garching
1993: ESO in Garching
1994-2007: Director of Dunsink Observatory
1994-2010: Senior professor at Dublin Institute for Advanced Studies (DIAS)
1995-2012: Adjunct Professor of Astronomy at Trinity College Dublin (TCD)
1995-2012: Adjunct professor at Dublin City University (DCU)
2011-present: Full professor at the University of Amsterdam
