= Susan McKenna-Lawlor =

Irish astrophysicist

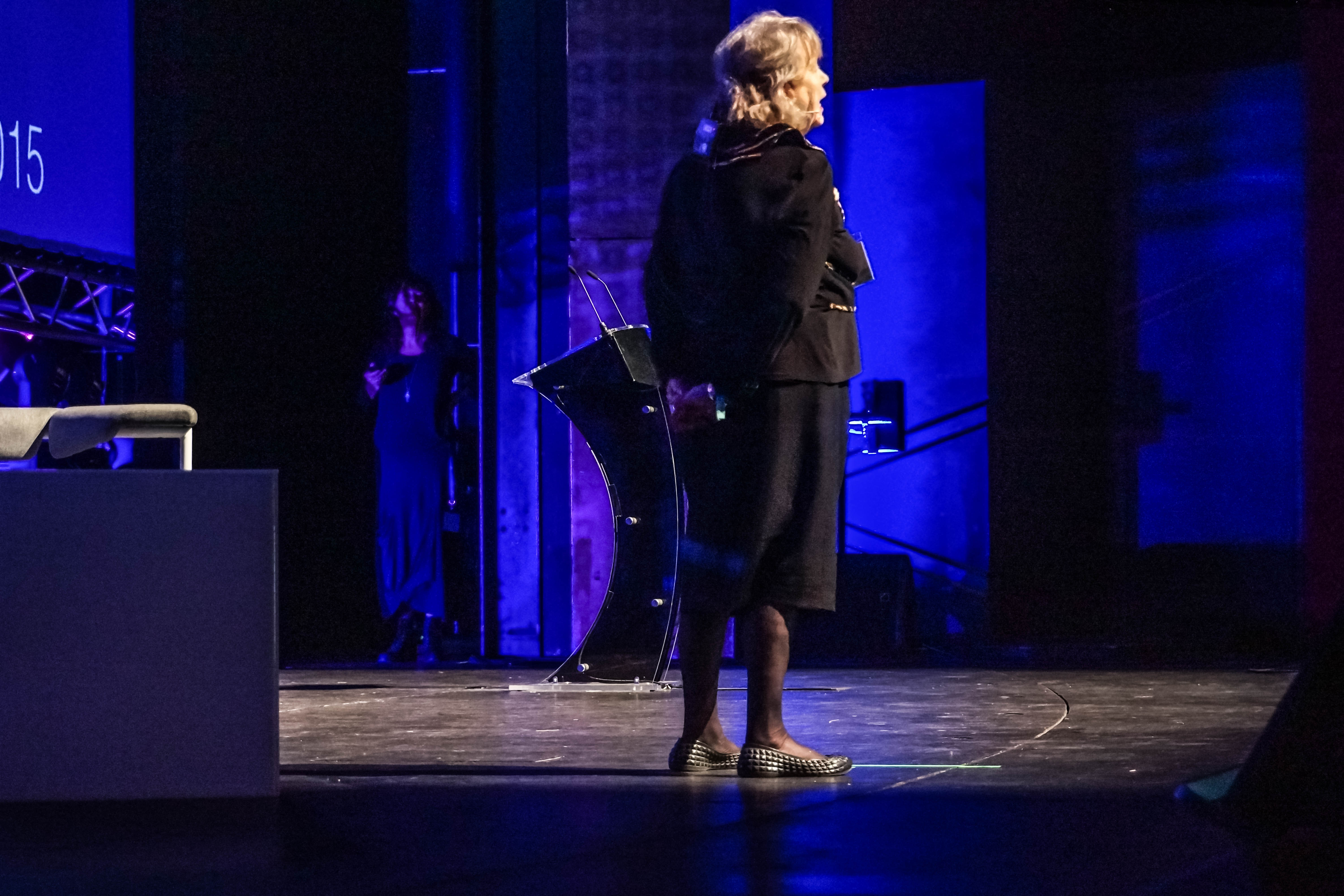
- Susan McKenna-Lawlor in 2015
- Born: 3 March 1935 (age 91); Dublin, Ireland
- Education: University College Dublin
- Scientific career
- Fields: Planetary science, Experimental Physics
- Thesis: A Detailed Study of Phenomena Attending the Disk Passage of an Exceptionally Active Solar Region, 7–21 July 1959 (1976)
- Doctoral advisor: T.E. Nevin
- Website: https://www.maynoothuniversity.ie/people/susan-mckenna-lawlor

Susan McKenna-Lawlor (born 3 March 1935) is an Irish astrophysicist. She is an emeritus professor of experimental physics at Maynooth University, having formally retired in 2000.

== Early life and education ==
McKenna-Lawlor was born in Dublin on 3 March 1935. She studied experimental physics at University College Dublin (BSc 1956, MSc 1959, PhD 1976). She was a research assistant at the Dublin Institute for Advanced Studies between 1957 and 1966. Her 1976 UCD doctotral dissertation on "A detailed study of phenomena attending the disk passage of an exceptionally active solar region July 07–21, 1959" was completed under Thomas E. Nevin, based on work originally suggested by Mervyn A. Ellison of the Dublin Institute for Advanced Studies, and partially completed by McKenna at the University of Michigan.

Following her marriage, McKenna-Lawlor became a lecturer in the Department of Experimental Physics at St. Patrick's College, Maynooth in the early 1970s. In 1986 she was appointed professor, and she retired from Maynooth in 2000.

== Space Technology Ireland Ltd ==
In 1986, she founded the space instrumentation company Space Technology Ireland Ltd (STIL) with venture capitalist Dermot Desmond. STIL manufactures instruments for space missions where Mckenna serves as the managing director.

== Research and career ==
McKenna-Lawlor was the principal investigator for the Energetic Particle Analyser (EPA) instrument on the European Space Agency (ESA) Giotto mission. The European Space Agency Solar System working group initially rejected the instrument, before reinstating it in the first half of 1981.

McKenna-Lawlor led an international team of scientists in building a particle detector capable of detecting energies between 30 kiloelectronvolts and several megaelectronvolts for the Soviet Union's Phobos spacecraft in 1988. The success of the detector led Soviet scientists to ask her to contribute a similar device for their 1994 Mars mission.

McKenna-Lawlor was a co-investigator for the experiment RAPID on board the European Space Agency (ESA) Cluster mission. She also developed instruments to monitor the solar wind on Mars for the ESA Mars Express mission.

STIL designed the onboard Electrical Support System processor unit for the Rosetta spacecraft. McKenna-Lawlor also represented Ireland on the Steering Board of the Rosetta's Philae lander that landed on comet 67P/Churyumov–Gerasimenko.

== Awards and recognition ==
McKenna-Lawlor was a winner of the Rehab People of the Year Award in 1986. She was elected to the International Academy of Astronautics, and in 2005 she received an honorary DSc from the University of Ulster for her contributions to astrophysics.

She was a member of the National University of Ireland Senate and of Maynooth University's Governing Authority.

== Bibliography ==
- McKenna-Lawlor, S. (1968). Astronomy in Ireland from 1780. Vistas in Astronomy.
- McKenna-Lawlor, S. (2003). Whatever Shines Should be Observed. Springer Netherlands. ISBN 978-94-017-0351-2.

McKenna-Lawlor has published or co-authored over 250 scientific papers.
