= Dunsink Observatory =

Observatory near Dublin, Ireland

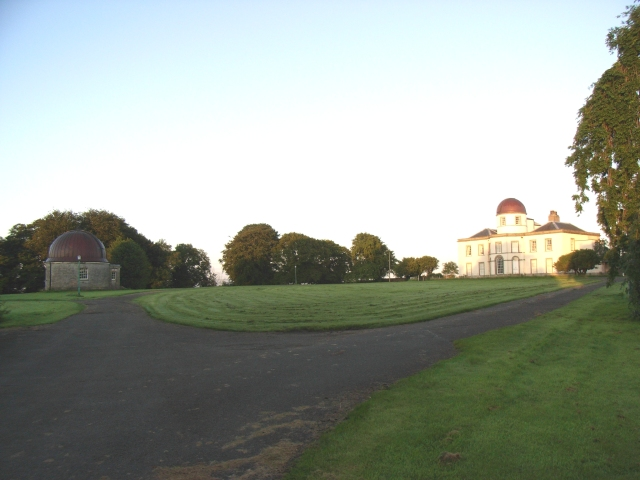
- Organization: Dublin Institute for Advanced Studies (DIAS)
- Observatory code: 982
- Location: Dunsink, Dublin, Ireland
- Coordinates: 53°23′13″N 6°20′15″W
- Established: 1785
- Website: Dunsink Observatory

Telescopes
- South Telescope: Refracting (lens) telescope
- Related media on Commons

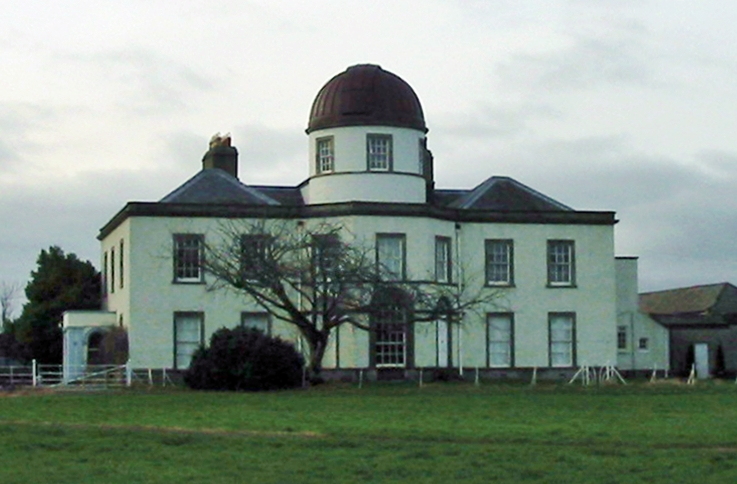
Dunsink Observatory

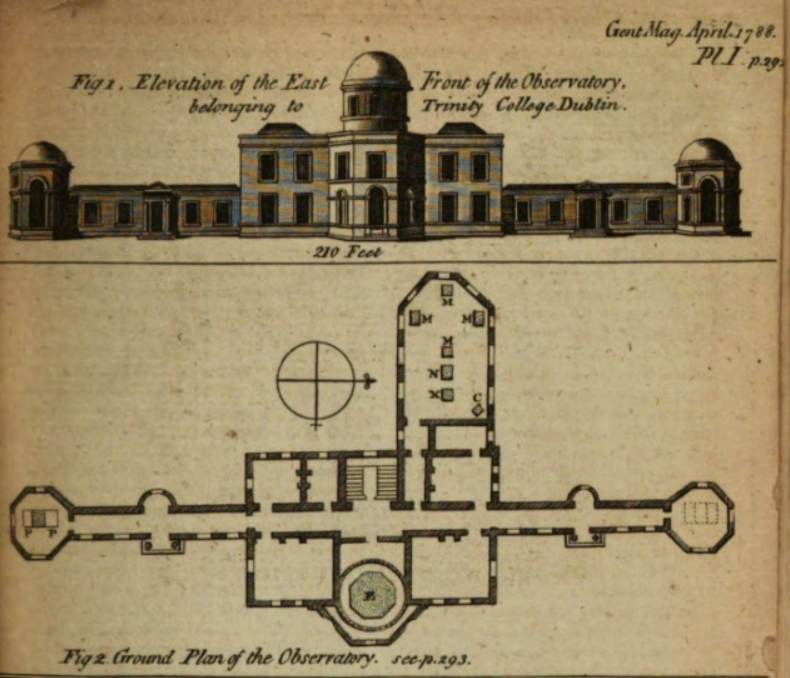
A plan of the observatory from the Gentleman's Magazine in 1788.

The Dunsink Observatory is an astronomical observatory established in 1785 in the townland of Dunsink in the outskirts of the city of Dublin, Ireland.

Directors of the observatory include William Rowan Hamilton, who, amongst other things, discovered quaternions, the first non-commutative algebra form, while walking from the observatory to the city with his wife. The annual Hamilton Walk that commemorates this discovery begins at the observatory.

== History ==
The observatory was established by an endowment of £3,000 in the will of Francis Andrews, who was Provost of Trinity College Dublin at his death on 18 June 1774. The site was established on the south slope of a low hill in the townland of Dunsink, 84m above sea level. The South Telescope, a 12-inch Grubb instrument, is a refracting telescope built by Thomas Grubb of Dublin and completed in 1868. The achromatic lens, with an aperture of 11.75 inches, was donated by Sir James South in 1862. He had purchased the lens from Cauchoix of Paris 30 years earlier. He had intended it for a large but troubled equatorial that came to fruition in the 1830s, but was dismantled around 1838. (See also Great refractors)

The entry for the observatory in Thom's Directory (1850) gives the following account of the observatory,

::ASTRONOMICAL OBSERVATORY OF THE UNIVERSITY OF DUBLIN, DUNSINK

Astronomer Royal, Sir William Rowan Hamilton, A.M., LL.D.
Assistant Astronomer, Charles Thomson, esq.

This Observatory, endowed by Francis Andrews, esq., LL.D., Provost of Trinity College, and erected in 1785, was placed, by statute, in 1791, under the management of the "Royal Astronomer of Ireland," an appointment first filled by Dr. Henry Ussher, and subsequently by Dr. Brinkley, Bishop of Cloyne.

The Institution is amply furnished with astronomical instruments, and is open to all persons interested in astronomical science, on introduction to the resident Assistant. It is situated in Lat. 53° 23' 13" N., Long. 6° 20' 15" W.

Dublin Mean Time, the official time in Ireland from 1880, was the local mean time at Dunsink, just as Greenwich Mean Time (GMT) is the local mean time at Greenwich Royal Observatory near London. In 1916, Ireland moved to GMT. In 1936, Trinity College stopped maintaining the observatory and rented out the land.

Éamon de Valera, who had driven the establishment of the Dublin Institute for Advanced Studies (DIAS) in 1940, added a School of Cosmic Physics to it in 1947, partly in order to revive the observatory, for which it was given responsibility. Éamon de Valera's signature appears in Dunsink Observatory visitor book dated 13 January 1949.

The named chair Andrews Professorship of Astronomy was associated with the directorship of Dunsink Observatory during the time that the observatory was part of Trinity College Dublin (TCD).

By the late 20th century, the city encroached ever more on the observatory, increasing the atmospheric turbulence thus reducing the quality of the telescope's images. The telescope itself is now used mainly for public open nights.

The observatory is currently part of the DIAS. It is a research institute and regularly hosts visiting scholars and scientists, alongside various conferences and public outreach events. Public talks on astronomy and astrophysics are given regularly at the observatory by professional and amateur astronomers. Stargazing events are also held using the Grubb telescope.

In 2025, the Irish Historic Astronomical Observatories, consisting of Dunsink Observatory, Birr Castle and Armagh Observatory, were added to the World Heritage Tentative List, a step towards becoming a UNESCO World Heritage Site.

== Directors of the observatory ==
Dates	Name	Other titles	Notes
1783–1790	Rev. Henry Ussher	Andrews Professor of Astronomy	Died in office
1792–1827	Rev. John Brinkley	Andrews Professor of Astronomy, Royal Astronomer of Ireland (from 1793)	Appointed Bishop of Cloyne in 1826
1827–1865	Sir William Rowan Hamilton	Andrews Professor of Astronomy, Royal Astronomer of Ireland	Appointed as a 21-year-old undergraduate. In addition to astronomy, he worked on mathematics. He developed what is now known as Hamiltonian mechanics, and the system of quaternions, having discovered them in 1843. He died in office.
1865–1874	Franz Brünnow	Andrews Professor of Astronomy, Royal Astronomer of Ireland	Retired due to failing health and eyesight
1874–1892	Sir Robert Stawell Ball	Andrews Professor of Astronomy, Royal Astronomer of Ireland	In 1892 became Lowndean Professor of Astronomy and Geometry at Cambridge
1892–1897	Arthur Alcock Rambaut	Andrews Professor of Astronomy, Royal Astronomer of Ireland	In 1897 became Radcliffe Observer at Oxford
1897–1906	Charles Jasper Joly	Andrews Professor of Astronomy, Royal Astronomer of Ireland	Died in office
1906–1912	Sir Edmund Taylor Whittaker	Andrews Professor of Astronomy, Royal Astronomer of Ireland	In 1911 became a professor at Edinburgh
1912–1921	Henry Crozier Keating Plummer	Andrews Professor of Astronomy, Royal Astronomer of Ireland	In 1921 became professor of mathematics at the Artillery College in Woolwich
1921–1936	Charles Martin		Acting Director, assisted by F J O'Connor (1908-1987). Died in office
1936–1947	Vacant		No astronomical work was done
1947–1957	Hermann Alexander Brück	Director of DIAS School of Cosmic Physics	In 1957 became Astronomer Royal for Scotland
1958–1963	Mervyn Archdall Ellison	Director of DIAS School of Cosmic Physics	Died in office
1964–1992	Patrick Arthur Wayman	Andrews Professor of Astronomy (from 1984, honorary), Director of DIAS School of Cosmic Physics	Retired, with a short gap before the next appointment.
1994–2007	Evert Meurs	Senior Professor DIAS	Retired
2007–2018	Luke Drury	Andrews Professor of Astronomy (honorary), Director of DIAS School of Cosmic Physics	Retired
2018–present	Peter T. Gallagher	Senior Professor and Head of Astronomy and Astrophysics, DIAS	

== In fiction ==
The observatory is one of the locations featured in the book, The Coroner's Daughter by Andrew Hughes, which was selected as the Dublin UNESCO City of Literature One City One Book for 2023.

== See also ==
- Dublin Institute for Advanced Studies
- List of astronomical observatories
