= Thomas Edwin Nevin =

Irish physicist and academic (1906–1986)

- Born: 4 October 1906; Bristol, Sumerset
- Died: 16 July 1986 (aged 79); Dublin
- Education: University College Dublin
- Spouse: Monica T. M. Morrissey
- Children: 4
- Scientific career
- Fields: Molecular spectroscopy
- Workplaces: University College Dublin
- Thesis: The Effect of Water Vapour on the Diffusion Coefficients and Mobilities of Ions in the Air (1928)
- Academic advisors: J.J. Nolan
- Notable students: Susan McKenna-Lawlor

Thomas Edwin Nevin (4 October 1906 in Bristol, Somerset – 16 July 1986 in Dublin) was an Irish physicist and academic who had a distinguished career in the field of molecular spectroscopy. He was Professor of Experimental Physics and Dean of the Faculty of Science in University College Dublin from 1963 to 1979.

== Personal life ==
Thomas E. Nevin was born in Bristol, Somerset on 4 October 1906. He was the eldest of seven children born to Thomas Nevin of Cashel, County Tipperary, and Alice Nevin (née Higginson) of Herefordshire. Áine Ní Chnáimhín (1908–2001) who wrote a biography of Pádraic Ó Conaire was Nevin's sister; historian and trade unionist Donal Nevin was his brother.

In January 1936 he married Monica T. M. Morrissey, a UCD graduate in Celtic studies who went on to serve on the Council of the Royal Society of Antiquaries of Ireland and did research on antiquarian matters for Irish History Online. The couple had four daughters together.

== Education and career ==
Born in 1906 in Bristol, England, the oldest of seven children of an Irish father and English mother, the family soon settled in Ireland where he spent his youth. From 1919 to 1924 he attended the CBS Sexton Street secondary school in Limerick City. The school had no science program, but Nevin was interested in physics and managed to learn the subject pretty thoroughly on his own. In 1924 he got a scholarship to University College Dublin, where he excelled in mathematics and physics, winning first-class honours every year, and earning an honours B.Sc. in Experimental Physics and Mathematics in 1927. He got his M.Sc. under J.J. Nolan in 1928 for a treatise on "The Effect of Water Vapour on the Diffusion Coefficients and Mobilities of Ions in the Air". That year he was also awarded an 1851 Research Fellowship, which enabled him to study spectroscopy at Imperial College, London (1929–1931). In 1931, he returned to Dublin to continue his research and was appointed an assistant in the department of experimental physics.

In 1940, he was awarded a D.Sc. degree at National University of Ireland for previously published work, and in 1942, he was awarded an honorary doctorate at Queen's University Belfast. Throughout the 1930s and 1940s he continued his research in molecular spectroscopy, often working with research groups in fundamental particle and cosmic ray physics. He was a capable administrator at UCD, serving on the university's finance and buildings committees, as well as the academic council and governing body, and he initiated many improvements to the physics department. When J. J. Nolan died in 1952, Nevin succeeded him as Professor of Experimental Physics, a position he held until his retirement in 1979.

Nevin was a strong advocate for expansion of the UCD campus, which for half a century was based at Earlsfort Terrace in the city. As a key member of UCD's academic council and a member of its buildings committee (1957–76), he was instrumental in moving the science faculty to the new Belfield campus in the southern suburbs in 1964.

He was a key figure in the formation of the Irish branch of Institute of Physics.

At the Dublin Institute for Advanced Studies he was a member of the governing boards of the school of theoretical physics (1943-1961) and the school of cosmic physics (1948-1956). On 16 March 1942 he was elected a member of the Royal Irish Academy and served on its council from 1944 to 1968.

== Thomas E. Nevin Medal ==
The Thomas E. Nevin Medal and Prize is given annually, in honour of Nevin, to the graduate who passes with first-class honours and is placed first in the BSc (Honours) degree examination in Physics, at the University College Dublin..

== Papers ==
- 1985 Jeremiah Hogan and University College Dublin by Thomas E. Nevin, in Studies, An Irish Quarterly Review published by Irish Province of the Society of Jesus, Vol 74, No 295, pp. 325–335
- 1931 The spectrum of barium fluoride in the extreme red and near infra-red by Thomas E Nevin, Proceedings of the Physical Society, Vol 43, No 5.
- 1930 The Effect of Water Vapour on the Diffusion Coefficients and Mobilities of Ions in the Air by J. J. Nolan and T. E. Nevin, Proceedings of the Royal Society, London, 127, 155–174.
