= Franz Brünnow =

German astronomer (1821–1891)

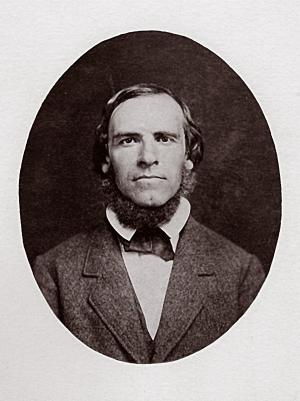
Franz Friedrich Ernst Brünnow

Franz Friedrich Ernst Brünnow (18 November 1821 – 20 August 1891) was a German astronomer.

He was the first foreigner to become director of an American observatory, serving as director of Detroit Observatory (at the University of Michigan) from 1854 to 1863. He played a major role in establishing the study of astronomy in the United States at a time when the only other serious faculty was run by Benjamin Peirce at Harvard University. He introduced the teaching of rigorous German analytical methods and trained a number of students who went on to further American astronomy, including Asaph Hall and James Craig Watson (the latter succeeded him as director of Detroit Observatory). In addition, Charles Augustus Young learned German astronomical methods from Brünnow although he did not attend the University of Michigan.

He succeeded William R Hamilton as Andrews Professor of Astronomy at Trinity College Dublin and Royal Astronomer of Ireland at Dunsink Observatory.

== Early career ==
Brünnow was born in Berlin to Johann and Wilhelmine (née Weppler) and attended the Friedrich Wilhelm Gymnasium. In 1839 he entered the University of Berlin, where he studied mathematics, astronomy and physics, as well as chemistry, philosophy and philology. After graduating as PhD in 1843 he took an active part in astronomical work at the Berlin Observatory, under the direction of Johann Franz Encke, contributing numerous important papers on the orbits of comets and minor planets to the Astronomische Nachrichten.

In 1847 he was appointed director of the Bilk Observatory, near Düsseldorf, and in the following year published the well-known Mémoire sur la comète elliptique de De Vico, for which he received the gold medal of the Amsterdam Academy. In 1851 he succeeded Johann Gottfried Galle as first assistant at the Berlin Observatory. Also in 1851 he wrote the textbook Lehrbuch der Sphärischen Astronomie, which he translated to English himself in 1865 as Handbook of Spherical Astronomy.

== Ann Arbor ==
He was recruited by University of Michigan president Henry Tappan and came to Ann Arbor in 1854 where he accepted the post of director of the new observatory (the Detroit Observatory). Some say he came to America to escape marrying Encke's daughter. In the US he published, from 1858 to 1862, a journal entitled Astronomical Notices, while his tables of the minor planets Flora, Victoria and Iris were severally issued in 1857, 1859 and 1869. He married Tappan's daughter Rebecca in 1857. In 1860 he went, as associate director of the observatory, to Albany, New York; but returned in 1861 to Michigan, and threw himself with vigour into the work of studying the astronomical and physical constants of the observatory and its instruments.

== Ireland and later years ==
He resigned in 1863 as a direct result of the dismissal of Tappan by the university's regents and returned to Germany. Then, on the death of Sir William Rowan Hamilton in 1865, he accepted the post of Andrews Professor of Astronomy at Trinity College Dublin and Royal Astronomer of Ireland. His first undertaking at the Dublin Observatory was the erection of an equatorial telescope to carry the fine object-glass presented to the university by Sir James South; and on its completion, he began an important series of researches on stellar parallax. The first, second and third parts of the Astronomical Observations and Researches made at Dunsink contain the results of these labours, and include discussions of the distances of the stars α Lyrae, ο Draconis, Groombridge 1830, 85 Pegasi, and Bradley 3077, and of the planetary nebula H. iv. 37. In 1873 the observatory, on Brünnow's recommendation, was provided with a first-class transit circle, which he proceeded to test as a preliminary to commencing an extended program of work with it. However, in 1874, as a result of failing health and eyesight, he resigned and retired to Basel. In 1880 he moved to Vevey, and in 1889 to Heidelberg, where he died on 20 August 1891. His headstone still stands in the Bergfriedhof, the old cemetery in Heidelberg.

== Legacy ==
The permanence of his reputation was secured by the merits of his Lehrbuch der sphärischen Astronomie, which were at once and widely appreciated. In 1860 part 1 was translated into English by Robert Main, the Radcliffe observer at Oxford; Brünnow himself published an English version in 1865; it reached in the original a fifth edition in 1881, and was also translated into French, Russian, Italian and Spanish.
