= John James Nolan =

Irish physicist (1888–1952)

John James Nolan (28 December 1888 – 18 April 1952) was an Irish physicist who served as President of the Royal Irish Academy from 1949 to 1952.

He was born near Omagh, County Tyrone and educated at University College Dublin (BA 1909, MA 1910, BSc 1911, MSc 1912). He then carried out research in the Physics Department under Professor John A. McClelland on the electrical charge of rain. He was awarded D.Sc in 1914.

In 1914, he married Hannah "Teresa" Hurley from near Bantry, in County Cork. The couple had five sons, one of whom died at the end of World War II. He was an uncle of abstract painter Evin Nolan.

In 1920, he succeeded McClelland as Professor of Experimental Physics, guiding research into atmospheric electricity and aerosols. Together with his brother, Patrick J. Nolan, and their students, they studied ionization, equilibrium and the relationships of small and large ions in the lower atmosphere. He also, with V. H. Guerrini, developed in 1935 the diffusion battery for measuring the size of aerosol particles.

When the School of Cosmic Physics was established at the Dublin Institute for Advanced Studies in 1947, John J. Nolan was appointed as its inaugural Chairman. He served until his death in 1952, and was succeeded in this position by Ernest Walton.

In 1950, Nolan successfully nominated Cecil Powell for the Nobel Prize in Physics. Five year earlier, he had nominated Patrick Blackett, who became a Nobel laureate in 1948.

In 1920, he was elected a Member of the Royal Irish Academy, becoming Secretary in 1923 and President from 1949 to 1952. He was also Registrar of University College Dublin from 1940 until his death. In 1952, he died while lecturing a large class at UCD in Earlsfort Terrace. He was succeeded as professor of physics at UCD in 1953 by his former student T. E. Nevin, whose M.Sc. thesis under Nolan was on "The Effect of Water Vapour on the Diffusion Coefficients and Mobilities of Ions in the Air,"
