= Charles Jasper Joly =

Irish mathematician (1864–1906)

Charles Jasper Joly FRS FRAS MRIA
- Born: 27 June 1864; Tullamore, County Offaly, Ireland
- Died: 4 January 1906 (aged 41); Dunsink, County Dublin, Ireland
- Education: Trinity College Dublin
- Known for: Quaternions
- Spouse: Jessie Meade (m. 1897)
- Children: 3
- Relatives: John Joly (second cousin)
- Awards: Fellow of the Royal Society (1904)
- Scientific career
- Fields: Mathematics; Astronomy
- Workplaces: Trinity College Dublin; Royal Irish Academy

Charles Jasper Joly FRS FRAS MRIA (27 June 1864 – 4 January 1906) was an Irish mathematician and astronomer who was Andrews Professor of Astronomy from 1897 until his death in 1906. He was an important figure in the study of quaternions.

== Early life ==
Joly was born at St Catherine's Rectory, Hop Hill, Tullamore, County Offaly, the eldest of six children of Rev. John Swift Joly (1818-1887) and Elizabeth Slator (1835-1904). He was a second cousin to John Joly. He was educated at Galway Grammar School. In 1882, he was enrolled at Trinity College Dublin on a mathematical scholarship and graduated with first place in mathematics in 1886. Winning a studentship and following his great interest in experimental physics, he moved to Berlin to work in Helmholtz’s laboratory.

== Career ==
In 1897, Joly was appointed Andrews Professor of Astronomy at Trinity College Dublin. Although there was some dispute as to his suitability, his mathematical skill was recognised, particularly his work on the mathematics of William Rowan Hamilton.

Over the next five years, he wrote numerous mathematical papers, particularly on the applicability of the theory of quaternions to several areas of mathematics: theory of strain, spherical harmonics, hydrodynamics and electromagnetism.

In 1900, he went on the RIA/RDS eclipse expedition to Spain and later took part in the British Association visit to South Africa in 1905.

In 1902, he became Secretary of the Royal Irish Academy.

== Personal life ==
On 20 March 1897, Joly married Jessie Sophie Meade. They had three daughters.

A keen member of the Alpine Club, he spent his holidays in the Alps, scaling the most difficult peaks. He was especially fond of rock climbing.

== Awards and honours ==
- 1895: Elected a member of the Royal Irish Academy.
- 1898: Elected a fellow of the Royal Astronomical Society.
- 1904: Elected a fellow of the Royal Society.

== Death ==
Shortly after his return from South Africa, he and his daughter contracted typhoid. He died on 4 January 1906. His daughter survived.

He was buried at Mount Jerome cemetery, Dublin.

== Publications ==
- William Rowan Hamilton and C.J. Joly: Elements of Quaternions (volume I, 1899) Longmans, Green & Co, (volume II, 1901)
- Quaternions and Projective Geometry (1903) Philosophical Transactions of the Royal Society of London 201:223–327
- A Manual of Quaternions (1905) from Cornell University Historical Math Monographs

Charles Joly published his articles in Royal Irish Academy journals, generally the Transactions, but as indicated below, in Proceedings of the Royal Irish Academy in 1897, 98, and 99:

- 1892: Theory of linear vector functions. 30:597 to 647
- 1896: Properties of general congruency of curves. 31:363 to 92
- 1897: On the homographic divisions of planes, spheres, and space and on the systems of lines joining corresponding points. Proceedings RIA 4(4): 515
- 1898: The associative algebra applicable to hyperspace. Proceedings R.I.A. 5(1):73 to 123
- 1899: Astaties and quaternion functions. Proceedings R.I.A. 5(3):366
- 1902: Interpretation of a quaternion as a point symbol. 32A: 1 to 16
- 1902: Quaternion arrays. 32:17 to 30
- 1902: Quadratic screw system: a study of a family of quadratic complexes. 32A:155 to 238
- 1902: Geometry of a three-system of screws. 32A:239 to 70

== Sources ==
- G. B. Mathews (1907) "C. J. Joly", Proceedings of the London Mathematical Society vols 2–4, issue 1, p. 1.

Academic offices
Preceded by Arthur Alcock Rambaut	Andrews Professor of Astronomy, Royal Astronomer of Ireland; 1897–1906	Succeeded by Sir Edmund Taylor Whittaker
