= Henry Keating =

Henry Keating may refer to:

- Henry Sheehy Keating (1775–1847), British officer
- Henry Singer Keating (1804–1888), British lawyer and politician
- Edward Henry Keating (1844-1912), Canadian engineer who proposed the creation of Keating channel
- John Keating (Australian politician) (John Henry Keating, 1872–1940)
- Henry Crozier Keating Plummer (1875–1946), British astronomer
- H. R. F. Keating (1926–2011), British crime fiction writer
