= Patrick Joseph Nolan =

Irish physicist

Patrick Joseph Nolan (11 August 1894 – 28 December 1984) was an Irish physicist. Like his older brother, physicist John James Nolan, he specialised in atmospheric physics. In 1971, he was awarded the Boyle Medal by the Royal Dublin Society.

He was born in Omagh, County Tyrone, and educated at University College Dublin. He earned a BSc in 1914, coming first in his class, and an MSc followed in 1915. A National University of Ireland travelling studentship in experimental physics (awarded in 1917) facilitated his spending some time doing research at the Cavendish Laboratory in Cambridge–at that time led by Ernest Rutherford. In 1922, he married Una Hurley from near Bantry, County Cork, a younger sister of his brother John's wife. The couple had no children. He was an uncle of abstract painter Evin Nolan.

From 1921 to 1928 he held the post of Lecturer on Experimental Physics at St Patrick's College in Maynooth. He spent the rest of his career at UCD, having been awarded his PhD there in 1922. In the 1930s and 1940s, he worked alongside his brother John, and numerous post graduate students, studying ionization, and atmospheric electrical parameters. He was appointed Professor of Geophysics in 1954, and retired in 1964. His publications included papers on the charge equilibrium of nuclei as it relates to the Boltzmann law, the combination of ions and nuclei, and the determination of the recombination coefficient of small ions.

Patrick J. Nolan is best remembered for the 1940s development of the Photoelectric Nucleus Counter with L. W. Pollak. This counter was long the standard instrument for the measurement of cloud condensation nuclei.

Nolan Served on the Governing Board of the School of Cosmic Physics at the Dublin Institute for Advanced Studies from 1947-1981.

== Sources ==
- O'Connor, Thomas C. (2001). The Evolution of Condensation Nucleus Counters, Department of Physics, National University of Ireland, Galway
- The Royal Dublin Society: Patrick J. Nolan
- McCartney, Mark and Whitaker, Andrew (2003). Physicists of Ireland: Passion and Precision Bristol and Philadelphia : Institute of Physics, ISBN 0750308664
