= Robert Stawell Ball =

Irish astronomer (1840–1913)

Sir Robert Stawell Ball FRS
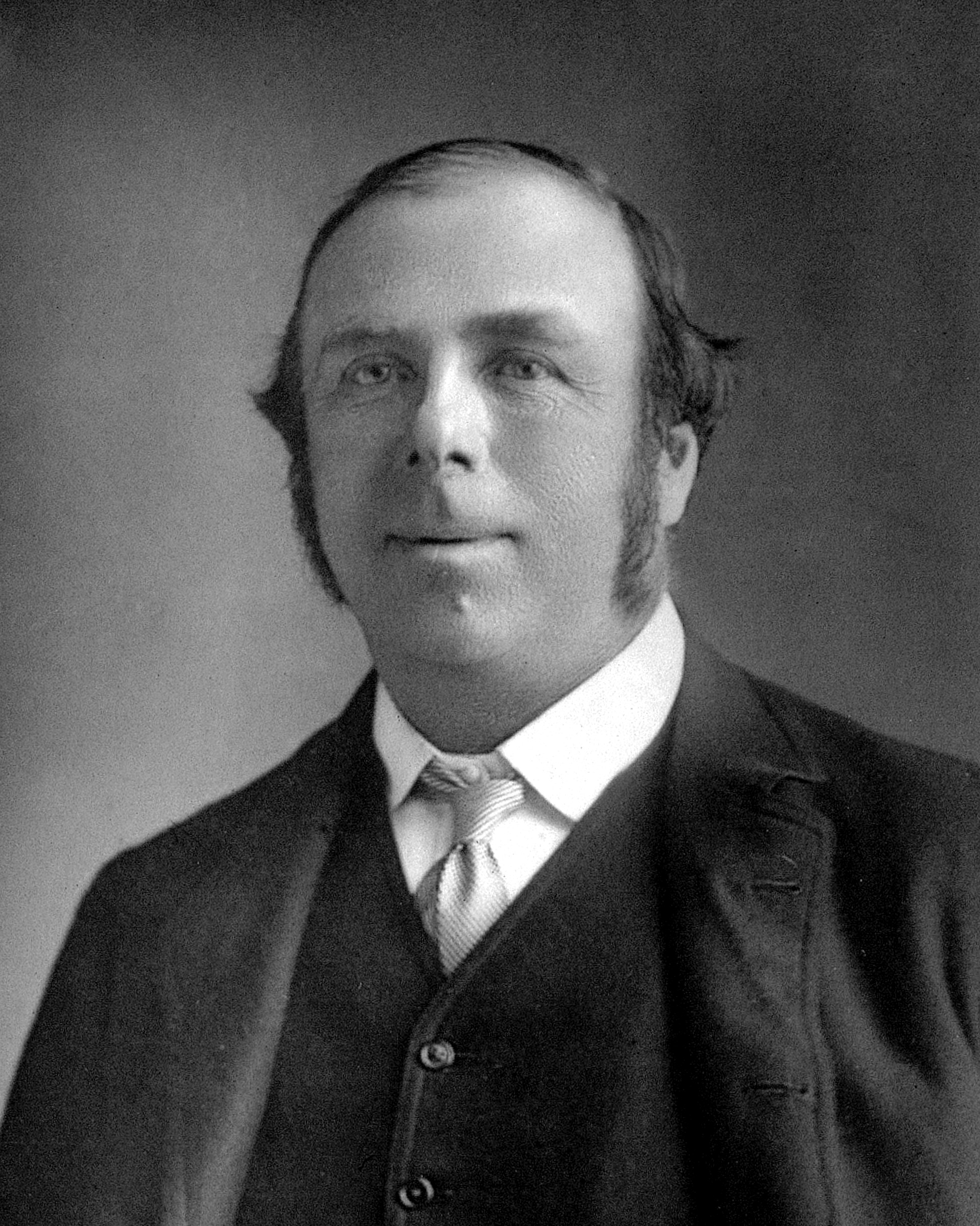

Royal Astronomer of Ireland
- In office 1874–1892
- Preceded by: Franz Brünnow
- Succeeded by: Arthur Alcock Rambaut

Personal details
- Born: 1 July 1840 Dublin, Ireland
- Died: 25 November 1913 (aged 73) Cambridge, England
- Parent: Robert Ball (father)
- Education: Trinity College Dublin
- Known for: Screw theory
- Scientific career
- Fields: Astronomy; Mechanics; Mathematics
- Workplaces: Trinity College Dublin; Cambridge Observatory and University of Cambridge

Sir Robert Stawell Ball FRS (1 July 1840 – 25 November 1913) was an Irish astronomer who founded the screw theory. He was Royal Astronomer of Ireland at Dunsink Observatory.

== Life ==
He was the son of naturalist Robert Ball and Amelia Gresley Hellicar. He was born in Dublin. and was educated at Trinity College Dublin where he won a scholarship in 1859 and was a senior moderator in both mathematics and experimental and natural science in 1861.

Ball worked for Lord Rosse from 1865 to 1867. In 1867, he became Professor of Applied Mathematics at the Royal College of Science in Dublin. There he lectured on mechanics and published an elementary account of the science.

In 1873, he became a Fellow of the Royal Society. In 1874, he was appointed Royal Astronomer of Ireland and Andrews Professor of Astronomy in Trinity College Dublin at Dunsink Observatory.

Ball contributed to the science of kinematics by delineating the screw displacement:

When Ball and the screw theorists speak of screws they no longer mean actual cylindrical objects with helical threads cut into them but the possible motion of any body whatsoever, including that of the screw independently of the nut.

Ball's treatise The Theory of Screws (1876) is now in the public domain.

His work on screw dynamics earned him in 1879 the Cunningham Medal of the Royal Irish Academy.

In 1882, Popular Science Monthly carried his article "A Glimpse through the Corridors of Time". The following year it carried his two-part article on "The Boundaries of Astronomy". He was knighted in 1886.

Ball expounded the tides in Time and Tide: a Romance of the Moon (1889). He published in 1891 The Cause of an Ice Age and in 1892 An Atlas of Astronomy.

In 1892, he was appointed Lowndean Professor of Astronomy and Geometry at Cambridge University at the same time becoming director of the Cambridge Observatory. In 1893 he published The Story of the Sun. In 1897, he was elected an International Member of the American Philosophical Society. He was a fellow of King's College, Cambridge.

In 1900, Cambridge University Press published A Treatise on the Theory of Screws. It followed works meant for a more general audience, such as The Story of the Heavens, first published in 1886. Much in the limelight, he stood as President of the Quaternion Association. He was also President of the Mathematical Association in 1900.

In 1908, he published A Treatise on Spherical Astronomy, which is a textbook on astronomy starting from spherical trigonometry and the celestial sphere, considering atmospheric refraction and aberration of light, and introducing basic use of a generalised instrument.

His work, The Story of the Heavens, is mentioned in the "Ithaca" chapter of Ulysses.

His lectures, articles and books (e.g. Starland and The Story of the Heavens) were mostly popular and simple in style.

== Death ==
He died in Cambridge and was buried at the Parish of the Ascension Burial Ground in Cambridge, with his wife, Lady Francis Elizabeth Ball.

Their children were: Frances Amelia, Robert Steele, William Valentine (later Sir), Mary Agnetta, Charles Rowan Hamilton, and Randall Gresley (later Colonel). Reminiscences and Letters of Sir Robert Ball by his son W.V. Ball was published in 1915 by Cassell & Company.

Minor planet 4809 Robertball is named in his honor.

He was the 38th President of the Birmingham and Midland Institute, which holds The Sir Robert Ball Library, the library of The Society for the History of Astronomy.

== Lectures ==
Ball became celebrated for his popular lectures on science. He gave an estimated 2500 lectures between 1875 and 1910 in towns and cities across Britain and Ireland.

In 1881, 1887, 1892, 1898 and 1900 he was invited to deliver the Royal Institution Christmas Lecture, Astronomy; Astronomy and Great Chapters from the Book of Nature. During the Lent term of 1900, he gave a lecture entitled The Eternal Stars to the Junior School section of Monkton Combe School in Combe Down, which was reported in the school magazine, The Magpie, 2 March 1900.

== Arms ==
Coat of arms of Robert Stawell Ball

Notes
Confirmed by Sir Arthur Edward Vicars, Ulster King of Arms, 12 June 1899.
Crest
An arm vambraced embowed Argent charged with two pellets the hand Proper grasping a fireball as in the arms.
Escutcheon
Argent on a chevron Gules between three fire balls Proper a galley with one mast sail furled a pennon floutaut in stow of the first.
Motto
On
