= Maurice O'Connor Drury =

Irish psychiatrist

Drury, probably photographed by Wittgenstein when he visited Dublin in 1936

Maurice O'Connor "Con" Drury (3 July 1907 – 25 December 1976) was an Irish psychiatrist, best known for his accounts of his conversations, and close friendship, with the philosopher Ludwig Wittgenstein.

== Early life and education ==
Drury was born in Marlborough, Wiltshire, England of Irish parents. He grew up in Exeter, Devon, England, where his father, Henry D'Olier Drury, who had been a teacher in Marlborough College, retired.

Drury was educated at Exeter Grammar School. He then studied philosophy at Trinity College, Cambridge. His tutors included G. E. Moore, C. D. Broad, W. E. Johnson and Ludwig Wittgenstein. Drury became Wittgenstein's friend for many years to come, until the latter's death in 1951. He was among a group of his friends present at his deathbed.

After graduation Drury entered the Cambridge theological college Westcott House, leaving after one year. In 1933 he enrolled in the medical school in Trinity College Dublin, graduating in 1939. Drury lacked the necessary funds to attend Trinity, so Wittgenstein solicited funds from wealthy friends, including the economist John Maynard Keynes who contributed around $150.

== Medical career ==
Drury joined the Royal Army Medical Corps, serving in Egypt and taking part in the Normandy landings. After his demobilisation, Drury worked as a House Physician in a hospital in Taunton. In 1947 he was appointed Resident Psychiatrist at St Patrick's Hospital Dublin. From 1951 he also worked in a subsidiary nursing home, St Edmundbury, Lucan, Dublin. He lectured medical students on psychology in Trinity College and the Royal College of Surgeons. He is described as relating to his student audience as "quite an intellectual man, who was very much speaking and relating to an audience as an intellectual." He was promoted to Senior Consultant Psychiatrist in 1969. In 1970 due to anginal pain he moved to a private residence in Dublin.

Drury brought Wittgenstein's "critique of language" to bear on the practice of medicine, and particularly psychology that promised the same control over the mind that physics achieved with matter. This promise, pointed out Drury, was one where the delivery date was always being pushed into the future.

== Personal life ==
He married the matron of St Patrick's Hospital, Eileen Herbert, in 1951. One of his children, Luke Drury, a physicist, was elected president of the Royal Irish Academy in 2011. His second son, Paul, was one of Ireland's most prominent newspaper editors, editing The Star, Evening Herald, Irish Daily Mail, and Ireland on Sunday. He was also deputy editor of the Irish Independent. He died in 2015.

Drury was a member of the Zoological Society of Ireland.

== Writings ==
Drury was the author of one book, The Danger of Words (1973). Ray Monk described the work as "though much neglected" perhaps "the most truly Wittgensteinian work published by any of Wittgenstein’s students." It was included in a collection of many of his writings edited by John Hayes and published in 2017.

His papers are on deposit in the library of Mary Immaculate College Limerick.

== Works ==
- The Danger of Words (1973)
  - The Danger of Words and Writings on Wittgenstein (1996)
