= Patrick Wayman =

English astronomer (1927–1998)

- Born: 8 October 1927; Bromley
- Died: 21 December 1998 (aged 71); County Dublin
- Alma mater: University of Cambridge; City of London School; Emmanuel College
- Occupation: Astronomer
- Academic career
- Institutions: Dublin Institute for Advanced Studies (1964–1992); Warner Observatory (1950–1952); Yerkes Observatory (1950–1952); Royal Observatory (1952–1957); Royal Observatory, Cape of Good Hope (1957–1960); Radcliffe Observatory (1957–1960); Royal Observatory (1960–1964)
- Doctoral advisor: Edward Linfoot

Patrick Wayman (8 October 1927 – 21 December 1998) was an English astronomer and director of Dunsink Observatory from 1964 to 1992.

== Early life and education ==
Patrick Arthur Wayman was born in Bromley, Kent, England on 8 October 1927. His parents were Mary (née Palmer) and Lt-col. Lewis John Wayman. He also had a twin brother. From 1937 to 1945 he attended City of London School, and then Emmanuel College, Cambridge from 1945 to 1948, graduating in 1948 in mathematics and physics. His 1953 PhD thesis from Cambridge University was entitled "Applications of aspheric optics to astronomy".

== Career ==
From 1950 to 1952 he worked at the Warner and Swasey observatories in Cleveland and at Yerkes Observatory, Wisconsin. In 1952 he returned to Royal Greenwich Observatory (RGO) at Herstmonceux, Sussex and became head of the solar department in 1955. He and his family moved to South Africa while he worked at the Cape Observatory and the Radcliffe Observatory, Pretoria. He returned to the RGO to the meridian department in 1960, going on to become head of that meridian department, and later the principal scientific officer in 1963. In 1964 he took up the position as senior professor of the school of cosmic physics, Dublin Institute for Advanced Studies (DIAS) and became the resident director of Dunsink Observatory until 1992. He became director of the school of cosmic physics, DIAS in 1967.

A colleague, Tao Kiang, stated that Wayman "changed the face of astronomy in Ireland". While at Dunsink, he expanded and adapted the facilities, with a focus on computing and electronics. He forged connections between Dunsink and international observatories such as Boyden Observatory, South Africa with the Armagh–Dunsink–Harvard (ADH) telescope, installed in 1952. Due to political pressure, this partnership ended in the mid-1970s. Wayman later negotiated the participation of Ireland in the International Observatory built on La Palma, Canary Islands. He was interested in advanced imaging cameras and instrumentation, and the theoretical study of the Solar System and galactic dynamics. He was also an advocate for the history of astronomy, which led him to oversee the restoration of the dome shutters in 1985, the South telescope in 1987, and the 12-inch Grubb refractor in 1988, as well as his publication Dunsink observatory, 1785–1985 – a bicentennial history (1987).

In 1974 he helped found the Astronomical Science Group of Ireland, and was a member of the International Astronomical Union serving as general secretary from 1979 to 1982 leading to the return of Chinese astronomers to the Union for the first time in 20 years. He oversaw the establishment of a permanent secretariat of the Union in Paris. From 1966 he was a member of the Royal Irish Academy, serving on the council from 1975 to 1978, chairman of committees for astronomy and for the history and philosophy of science and vice-president from 1978 to 1979. From 1982 he was an associate of the Royal Astronomical Society, and the honorary Andrews professor, at Trinity College Dublin in 1984. In 1993 the National University of Ireland awarded him an honorary D.Sc.

== Personal life ==
On 19 June 1954, Wayman married Mavis McIntyre Smith Gibson. She had been working at the Nautical Almanac Office, RGO. The couple had two daughters, Sheila and Karen, and a son, Russell. After his retirement in 1992, he moved to Wicklow town. In 1997, Wayman became the first chair of the National Committee for Commemorative Plaques in Science and Technology. He continued his association with Dunsink, and at the time of his death had almost finished a biography of Thomas and Howard Grubb. He died in Dublin on 21 December 1998.
