= Geological Survey of Ireland =

National earth science agency of Ireland

Geological Survey Ireland or Geological Survey of Ireland (Irish: Suirbhéireacht Gheolaíochta Éireann), founded in 1845, is the national earth science agency of Ireland. It is headquartered in Dublin.

== Overview ==
Geological Survey Ireland was founded in 1845. As a discrete part of the Geological Survey of Great Britain, with its own Director for Ireland, the organisation commenced bedrock mapping in 1845.

As of the 21st century, Geological Survey Ireland is a division of the Department of Communications, Climate Action and Environment and its multidisciplinary staff work in sections such as groundwater, bedrock mapping (consisting of bedrock and quaternary/geotechnical), information management, heritage, marine and minerals. It is responsible for providing geological advice and information, and for the acquisition of data for this purpose. Geological Survey Ireland produces maps, reports and databases, and acts as a knowledge centre and project partner in a number of aspects of Irish geology.

The organisation managed the Irish National Seabed Survey (INSS, 1999–2005), which on completion was the world's largest civilian marine mapping programme. The INSS mapped all of Ireland's waters over 200 m deep, principally in support of territorial claim, and covering over 600,000 km^{2}. Since 2006, Geological Survey Ireland has managed the successor programme INFOMAR (Integrated Mapping for the Sustainable Development of Ireland's Marine Resources), which is completing the mapping of all Irish waters. INFOMAR is funded by the Geological Survey Ireland parent department and undertaken in conjunction with the Marine Institute Ireland.

The organisation has historically been headquartered at Beggars Bush, Haddington Road, Dublin 4. From 2022, during refurbishment of these premises, it was based in Booterstown, Dublin.

GSI and the Dublin Institute for Advanced Studies operate the Irish National Seismic Network together.
