= Irish National Seismic Network =

Seismic sensor network in Ireland

The Irish National Seismic Network is a network of six permanent seismic sensors in Ireland, run by the Dublin Institute for Advanced Studies and Geological Survey Ireland.

Despite Ireland being one of the seismically quietest places on the planet, there is still a measurable amount of seismic activity. Given the size of the network, the smallest earthquakes that can be detected are about 1.0 on the Richter scale, which would not be felt by people. Donegal, Wexford and the Irish Sea are the most seismically active parts of Ireland, but the strongest seismic events are in the Atlantic.

DIAS hopes to add another sensor about 3 km below the Atlantic to measure seismic events to the west of Ireland.

Valentia Observatory is part of the network and is the oldest seismic recording station in Ireland, taking measurements since 1962.
