= Edward Linfoot =

British mathematician

Edward Hubert Linfoot FRAS
- Born: 8 June 1905; Sheffield
- Died: 14 October 1982 (aged 77); Cambridge
- Education: University of Oxford
- Scientific career
- Fields: Mathematics, Astronomy, Optics
- Workplaces: University of Bristol; University of Cambridge
- Doctoral advisor: G. H. Hardy
- Doctoral students: Emil Wolf, Patrick Wayman

Edward Hubert Linfoot (8 June 1905 – 14 October 1982) was a British mathematician, primarily known for his work on optics, but also noted for his work in pure mathematics.

== Early life and career ==
Edward Linfoot was born in Sheffield, England, in 1905. He was the eldest child of George Edward Linfoot, a violinist and mathematician, and George's wife Laura, née Clayton. After attending King Edward VII School he won a scholarship to Balliol College at the University of Oxford.

During his time at Oxford he met the number theorist G. H. Hardy, and after graduating in 1926, Linfoot completed a D.Phil under the supervision of Hardy with a thesis entitled Applications of the Theory of Functions of a Complex Variable.

After brief stints at the University of Göttingen, Princeton University, and Balliol College, Linfoot took a job in 1932 as assistant lecturer, and later lecturer, at the University of Bristol. During the 1930s Linfoot's interests slowly made the transition from pure mathematics to the application of mathematics to the study of optics, but not before proving an important result in number theory with Hans Heilbronn, that there are at most ten imaginary quadratic number fields with class number 1.

== Shift to optics ==
The exact reasons that Linfoot chose to switch his research from pure mathematics to optics are complex and there is probably no single most important reason. John Bell has highlighted the role played by Linfoot's political awareness, in particular his relationship with Heilbronn who had been forced to flee Nazi Germany. Suspecting a second world war was imminent, and knowing his delicate constitution would not make it through military physical examinations, Linfoot decided to contribute to the future war with scientific advancements in the field of optics. Other contributing factors to this change in focus were his lifelong fondness for astronomy and, by Linfoot's own testimony, a feeling that he had reached the limits of his pure mathematical creativity.

This shift was facilitated by C. R. Burch of the H. H. Wills Physics Laboratory in Bristol who led the University's optics group. Burch was a physical thinker but recognised the benefits of strong mathematical ability in understanding physics, and so encouraged Linfoot in his transition. Linfoot availed himself of the laboratory's facilities to first construct his own telescope and later to apply the theory of aspheric lenses to create a new microscope which he exhibited at the 1939 Annual Exhibition of the Physical Society.

It was also during this time, in 1935, that Linfoot married fellow mathematician Joyce Dancer, with whom he had three children, Roger in 1941, Margaret in 1945 and Sebastian in 1947.

During World War II Linfoot put his skills to use for the Ministry of Aircraft Production, producing optical systems for air reconnaissance.

== Cambridge astronomer ==
Following the war, Linfoot was awarded an ScD by the University of Oxford for his work in mathematics. A few months after this, Linfoot moved to the University of Cambridge, being appointed Assistant Director of the Cambridge Observatory. He remained at Cambridge until his retirement in 1970, eventually succeeding H. A. Brück as John Couch Adams Astronomer.

During this time Linfoot took a great interest in Claude Shannon's new field of information theory and also in computers, writing several programs for the Electronic Delay Storage Automatic Calculator at Cambridge. He also wrote two books on optics, and seems to have planned a third.

His demonstrable skill at crafting optics was in demand, leading him to positions as a consultant for various groups and projects, including the construction of three large telescopes—the Schmidt–Cassegrain telescope, the Isaac Newton Telescope, and the Anglo-Australian Telescope—and for NASA.

Linfoot died in Cambridge in 1982 at the age of 77, and is buried in the Parish of the Ascension Burial Ground in Cambridge.

== Academic legacy ==
Linfoot's mathematical papers cover the period 1926–1939, all his subsequent work being on optics. These papers cover a wide range of areas in Fourier analysis, number theory, and probability, the first of these being applied later to his optical studies. His optics work was primarily concerned with synthesis, error balancing, assessment and testing. In particular he used his prodigious mathematical background to determine ways to improve and invent new optical configurations. He was a fellow of Wolfson College, Cambridge.
