= Evin Nolan =

Irish painter and sculptor

- Born: 21 July 1930; Curragh Camp, County Kildare
- Died: 22 July 2016 (aged 86)
- Education: Terenure College; National College of Art
- Known for: Painter and sculptor

Michael Evin Nolan (21 July 1930 – 22 July 2016) was an Irish abstract painter and sculptor. He was much inspired by Henri Matisse, Piet Mondrian, Amedeo Modigliani, Pablo Picasso and Jacques Lipchitz. His work is often distinguished by vibrant colours and geometric forms.

== Biography ==
Nolan was born in 1930 at the Curragh Camp, County Kildare, to Lieutenant Colonel Martin Leo Nolan (the first teacher at the Cadet College there in 1928) and his wife Mary Florence Carroll. The family moved to Dublin in 1933, where Nolan later attended Terenure College and the National College of Art in Dublin's Kildare Street. He won two Royal Dublin Society-sponsored Taylor Awards in 1954, one for watercolours, and another for landscapes, and first exhibited at the Irish Exhibition of Living Art in 1955 and at the Royal Hibernian Academy, RHA, in 1956, before relocating to London for a few years.

By the early 1960s, Nolan was back in Dublin drawing cartoons for Dublin Opinion and other publications, while his art gradually transitioned from watercolours and oil landscapes to abstract art and sculpture. His first solo show was at the Dublin Painters Gallery in 1963, and he was an active member in the establishment of the Project Arts Centre in Abbey Street in 1966–67.

Over the decades Nolan continued to exhibit at the Irish Exhibition of Living Art, as well as taking part in the annual RHA exhibitions and at the Oireachtas festivals. He had one-man exhibitions at Dublin's United Arts Club, Kenny Gallery in Galway, Northern Ireland Arts Gallery in Belfast, the Grafton Gallery in Dublin, as well as at several at the Project and at the RHA. His solo April 1976 show at the Project was opened by Cearbhall Ó Dálaigh, president of Ireland. His last show was a major retrospective ‘Works 1984 to 1999’ at the RHA Gallagher Gallery in Dublin in 1999.

Notable commissions include one for Scott Tallon Walker Architects, an 18-foot long work for University College Galway, and an outdoor sculpture for Mayo County Council. The Arts Council of Northern Ireland awarded him "Art in Context" First Place in 1975. For a period in the 1970s and 1980s he taught at the Dún Laoghaire College of Art and Design.

Nolan, along with colleagues Seán Hillen and Dermot Seymour, was featured in a 2005 exhibition of Irish artists hosted by the European Central Bank in Frankfurt. His work is represented in the collections of the Arts Council of Ireland, the Irish Museum of Modern Art, University College Dublin, National University of Ireland Galway, St James's Hospital (Dublin), the Bank of Ireland, the National Self-Portrait Collection at the University of Limerick, Raidió Teilifís Éireann, Crawford Art Gallery (Cork), and in numerous private collections. Public installations of his sculpture have included works put on permanent display at Dublin Airport, Castlebar (County Mayo), Navan (County Meath), and Jordanstown (County Antrim).

Of his own oeuvre Nolan said, "My works are a unity of painting and sculpture: spatial-colour-structure. It is of real space and colour, as opposed to illusory space." Critic Cyril Barrett noted: "Since the mid-1980s he has used strips of coloured paper for his reliefs. These reliefs are very varied and, with the play of light and shadow, that comes from the strip in relief, achieve a far greater richness and nuance of colour than colours on a plane surface."

Nolan had a lifelong passion for physics and astronomy; two of his uncles, JJ Nolan and PJ Nolan, were prominent physicists. He also wrote an unpublished humorous play, in which Eratosthenes' ancient Greek quest to calculate the circumference of the Earth is placed in a Dublin context.

== Awards ==
- 1975: Art in Context, Arts Council of Northern Ireland. First Prize.
- 1954: Royal Dublin Society: Taylor Art Award.
- 1984: Oireachtas festival: Arthur Young Award.
