= Leo Wenzel Pollak =

Geophysicist, meteorologist

Leo Wenzel Pollak (September 23, 1888 in Prague – November 24, 1964 in Dublin) was a geophysicist, meteorologist and pioneer in scientific data processing. His career was spent at the Geophysical Institute in Prague, where he rose to the rank of professor and director (1911-1939), the Irish Meteorological Service (1939-1947), and the Dublin Institute for Advanced Studies (1947-1963).

In 1950, he was credited as the second author of the second edition of Victor Conrad's 1944 book, "Methods in Climatology."

== Life and career ==
His parents were the writers Simon Pollak and Dorothea Glück. In 1890, his father received patent no. 55433 for a telephone conversation counter.

From 1906 to 1910 he studied physics and geophysics at the German University in Prague and in 1910 received his doctorate under Rudolf Spitaler with the thesis "The duration and intensity of sunshine on the Douneuberge near Mileschau".

In 1911 he became a private lecturer at the Geophysical Institute in Prague and became friends with Albert Einstein who was a professor there. When Pollak sent a circular in August 1911 to look for astronomers who had observed the light deflection effect predicted by Einstein in the gravitational field, Erwin Freundlich accepted the challenge.

In 1922 he completed his habilitation and in 1927 he became an associate professor. In February 1929 he became, as Spitaler's successor, full professor and director of the Geophysical Institute in Prague and also director of the Meteorological Observatory in Milesovka, 20 miles south of Teplitz-Schönau.

In 1939 he emigrated to Ireland, where he worked for the Irish Meteorological Service. From 1947 to 1963 he taught as a professor at the School of Cosmic Physics at the Dublin Institute for Advanced Studies (DIAS).

In the 1940s he worked with P. J. Nolan, A. L. Metnieks and others to develop the first condensation nucleus counters.

Pollack's interest in condensation nuclei, cloud formation and atmospheric physics led him to make predictions about atmospheric warming. In the 1950s he gave a statutory public lecture at DIAS on global warming–even saying that someday "bananas will grow in Dublin."

== Data processing ==
In 1934 Pollak and F. Kaiser published a paper showing how punch card machines could be used to perform scientific calculations. Pollak was an early pioneer in "big data" and what we would now call data mining–he was an early adopter of Hollerith punched cards and automated tabulation for analyzing meteorological data. One aspect of this was searching for periodicities and trends in noisy data sets. He spent a lot of time and energy using mechanical calculators and tables to assist in Fourier analysis.

== Selected publications ==
- 1930 Die Rationalisierung und Mechanisierung der Verwaltung und Verrechnung geophysikalischen Zahlenmaterials. Das Lochkartenverfahren Naturwissenschaften (in German), 18 (16), pp. 343–349
- 1934 Neue Anwendungen des Lochkartenverfahrens in der Geophysik. (New applications of the punch card method in geophysics), [with F. Kaiser] in: Hollerith-Nachrichten. No 44, p. 574–584
- 1945 The Calibration of a Photo-Electric Nucleus Counter [with P. J. Nolan], Proceedings of the Royal Irish Academy
- 1951 Methods in climatology [with V. Conrad], American Journal of Physics
- 1959 Instruction for Use of Photo-Electric Condensation Nucleus Counters–Their Care and Maintenance [with A. L. Metnieks]
- 1960 Intrinsic Calibration of the Photo-Electric Condensation Nucleus Counter Model 1957 with Convergent Light-Beam [with A. L. Metnieks]
- 1962 On the validity of Boltzmann's distribution law for the charges of aerosol particles in electrical equilibrium [with A. L. Metnieks]
- 1950 [BOOK] "Methods in Climatology" [with V. Conrad], Pk. Harvard University Press ISBN 0674187857
