= Western European Summer Time =

Time zone (UTC+01:00)

- Time zone

UTC offset
- WEST: UTC+01:00

Current time
- :: WET [refresh]

Observance of DST
- This time zone is only used for DST. For the rest of the year, WET is used.

Time in Europe: Light Blue / Western European Time / Greenwich Mean Time (UTC); Blue / Western European Time / Greenwich Mean Time (UTC); Blue / Western European Summer Time / British Summer Time / Irish Standard Time (UTC+1); Red / Central European Time (UTC+1); Red / Central European Summer Time (UTC+2); Yellow / Eastern European Time / Kaliningrad Time (UTC+2); Ochre / Eastern European Time (UTC+2); Ochre / Eastern European Summer Time (UTC+3); Green / Moscow Time / Turkey Time (UTC+3); Turquoise / Armenia Time / Azerbaijan Time / Georgia Time / Samara Time (UTC+4); ▉▉▉▉ Pale hues: Standard time observed all year ▉▉▉ Dark hues: Daylight saving time

Western European Summer Time (WEST, UTC+01:00) is a summer daylight saving time scheme, 1 hour ahead of Greenwich Mean Time and Coordinated Universal Time. It is used in:

- the Canary Islands
- Portugal (including Madeira but not the Azores, which uses UTC+00;00)
- the Faroe Islands

The following countries also use the same time zone for their daylight saving time but use a different title:

- United Kingdom, which uses British Summer Time (BST)
- Ireland, which uses Irish Standard Time (IST) (Am Caighdeánach na hÉireann (ACÉ)). Also sometimes erroneously referred to as "Irish Summer Time" (Am Samhraidh na hÉireann).

The scheme runs from the last Sunday in March to the last Sunday in October each year. At both the start and end of the schemes, clock changes take place at 01:00 UTC+00:00. During the winter, Western European Time (WET, GMT+0 or UTC+00:00) is used.

The start and end dates of the scheme are asymmetrical in terms of daylight hours: the vernal time of year with a similar amount of daylight to late October is mid-February, well before the start of summer time. The asymmetry reflects temperature more than the length of daylight.

Ireland observes Irish Standard Time during the summer months and changes to UTC+00:00 in winter. As Ireland's winter time period begins on the last Sunday in October and finishes on the last Sunday in March, the result is the same as if it observed summer time.

== Usage ==
The following countries and territories use UTC+01:00 during the summer, between 1:00 UTC on the last Sunday of March and 1:00 UTC on the last Sunday of October.

- Canary Islands, regularly since 1980 (rest of Spain is CEST, i.e. UTC+02:00)
- Faroe Islands, regularly since 1981
- Ireland
  - 1916–1939 summers IST
  - 1940–1946 all year IST
  - 1947–1968 summers IST
  - 1968–1971 all year IST
  - 1972– summers IST
- Portugal
  - Continental Portugal
    - 1916–1921 summers WEST
    - 1924 summer WEST
    - 1926–1929 summers WEST
    - 1931–1932 summers WEST
    - 1934–1941 summers WEST
    - 1942–1945 summers WEST (1942–1945 midsummers Western European Midsummer Time|WEMT=WEST+1)
    - 1946–1966 summers WEST
    - 1966–1976 all year WEST/CET
    - 1977–1992 summers WEST
    - 1992–1996 winters WEST/CET (1993–1995 summers CEST)
    - 1996– summers WEST
  - Madeira, regularly since 1982
- The United Kingdom
  - 1916–1939 summers BST
  - 1940–1945 all year BST (1941–1945 summers BDST=BST+1)
  - 1946 summer BST
  - 1947 summer BST (1947 midsummer BDST=BST+1)
  - 1948–1968 summers BST
  - 1968–1971 all year BST
  - 1972– summers BST

=== Ireland ===
In Ireland, since the Standard Time (Amendment) Act, 1971, Ireland has used UTC+1 in summer (officially "standard time", Irish: am caighdeánach, though usually called "summer time") and UTC+0 in winter (officially "winter time").

=== Portugal ===
Portugal moved to Central European Time and Central European Summer Time in 1992, but reverted to Western European Time in 1996 after concluding that energy savings were small, it had a disturbing effect on children's sleeping habits as it would not get dark until 22:00 or 22:30 in summer evenings, during winter mornings the sun was still rising at 9:00, with repercussions on standards of learning and school performance, and insurance companies reported a rise in the number of accidents.

=== United Kingdom ===
Starting in 1916, the dates for the beginning and end of BST each year were mandated by the Parliament of the United Kingdom. From 1940 to 1945, the country used British Summer Time in the winter months and British Double Summer Time, a further hour ahead of GMT, in the summer months. From 1968 to 1971, the country used BST throughout the year. In February 2002, the Summer Time Order 2002 changed the dates and times to match European rules for moving to and from daylight saving time.

== Start and end dates of British Summer Time and Irish Standard Time ==
Year	Begins (GMT)	Ends (GMT)	UK Notes	Ireland Notes
2025	Sun 30 March 01:00	Sun 26 October 01:00		
2024	Sun 31 March 01:00	Sun 27 October 01:00		
2023	Sun 26 March 01:00	Sun 29 October 01:00		
2022	Sun 27 March 01:00	Sun 30 October 01:00		
2021	Sun 28 March 01:00	Sun 31 October 01:00		
2020	Sun 29 March 01:00	Sun 25 October 01:00		
2019	Sun 31 March 01:00	Sun 27 October 01:00		
2018	Sun 25 March 01:00	Sun 28 October 01:00		
2017	Sun 26 March 01:00	Sun 29 October 01:00		
2016	Sun 27 March 01:00	Sun 30 October 01:00		
2015	Sun 29 March 01:00	Sun 25 October 01:00		
2014	Sun 30 March 01:00	Sun 26 October 01:00		
2013	Sun 31 March 01:00	Sun 27 October 01:00		
2012	Sun 25 March 01:00	Sun 28 October 01:00		
2011	Sun 27 March 01:00	Sun 30 October 01:00		
2010	Sun 28 March 01:00	Sun 31 October 01:00		
2009	Sun 29 March 01:00	Sun 25 October 01:00		
2008	Sun 30 March 01:00	Sun 26 October 01:00		
2007	Sun 25 March 01:00	Sun 28 October 01:00		
2006	Sun 26 March 01:00	Sun 29 October 01:00		
2005	Sun 27 March 01:00	Sun 30 October 01:00		
2004	Sun 28 March 01:00	Sun 31 October 01:00		
2003	Sun 30 March 01:00	Sun 26 October 01:00		
2002	Sun 31 March 01:00	Sun 27 October 01:00	UK adopts EU practice	Ireland adopts EU Practice
2001	Sun 25 March 01:00	Sun 28 October 01:00		
2000	Sun 26 March 01:00	Sun 29 October 01:00		
1999	Sun 28 March 01:00	Sun 31 October 01:00		
1998	Sun 29 March 01:00	Sun 25 October 01:00		
1997	Sun 30 March 01:00	Sun 26 October 01:00		
1996	Sun 31 March 01:00	Sun 27 October 01:00		
1995	Sun 26 March 01:00	Sun 22 October 01:00		
1994	Sun 27 March 01:00	Sun 23 October 01:00		
1993	Sun 28 March 01:00	Sun 24 October 01:00		
1992	Sun 29 March 01:00	Sun 25 October 01:00		
1991	Sun 31 March 01:00	Sun 27 October 01:00		
1990	Sun 25 March 01:00	Sun 28 October 01:00		
1989	Sun 26 March 01:00	Sun 29 October 01:00		
1988	Sun 27 March 01:00	Sun 23 October 01:00		
1987	Sun 29 March 01:00	Sun 25 October 01:00		
1986	Sun 30 March 01:00	Sun 26 October 01:00		
1985	Sun 31 March 01:00	Sun 27 October 01:00		
1984	Sun 25 March 01:00	Sun 28 October 01:00		
1983	Sun 27 March 01:00	Sun 23 October 01:00		
1982	Sun 28 March 01:00	Sun 24 October 01:00		
1981	Sun 29 March 01:00	Sun 25 October 01:00		
1980	Sun 16 March 02:00	Sun 26 October 02:00		
1979	Sun 18 March 02:00	Sun 28 October 02:00		
1978	Sun 19 March 02:00	Sun 29 October 02:00		
1977	Sun 20 March 02:00	Sun 23 October 02:00		
1976	Sun 21 March 02:00	Sun 24 October 02:00		
1975	Sun 16 March 02:00	Sun 26 October 02:00		
1974	Sun 17 March 02:00	Sun 27 October 02:00		
1973	Sun 18 March 02:00	Sun 28 October 02:00		
1972	Sun 19 March 02:00	Sun 29 October 02:00		
1971		Sun 31 October 02:00	BST all year ends	IST all year ends
1970			BST all year	IST all year
1969			BST all year	IST all year
1968	Sun 18 February 01:00		BST all year begins	IST all year begins
1967	Sun 19 March 02:00	Sun 29 October 02:00		
1966	Sun 20 March 02:00	Sun 23 October 02:00		
1965	Sun 21 March 02:00	Sun 24 October 02:00		
1964	Sun 22 March 02:00	Sun 25 October 02:00		
1963	Sun 31 March 02:00	Sun 27 October 02:00		
1962	Sun 25 March 02:00	Sun 28 October 02:00		
1961	Sun 26 March 02:00	Sun 29 October 02:00		
1960	Sun 10 April 02:00	Sun 2 October 02:00		
1959	Sun 12 April 02:00	Sun 4 October 02:00		
1958	Sun 20 April 02:00	Sun 5 October 02:00		
1957	Sun 14 April 02:00	Sun 6 October 02:00		
1956	Sun 22 April 02:00	Sun 7 October 02:00		
1955	Sun 17 April 02:00	Sun 2 October 02:00		
1954	Sun 11 April 02:00	Sun 3 October 02:00		
1953	Sun 19 April 02:00	Sun 4 October 02:00		
1952	Sun 20 April 02:00	Sun 26 October 02:00		
1951	Sun 15 April 02:00	Sun 21 October 02:00		
1950	Sun 16 April 02:00	Sun 29 October 02:00		
1949	Sun 3 April 02:00	Sun 30 October 02:00		
1948	Sun 14 March 02:00	Sun 31 October 02:00		
1947		Sun 2 November 02:00	Back to GMT	Back to GMT
1947	Sun 13 April 02:00	Sun 10 August 02:00	BDST (2 hours ahead)	IST / no DST
1947	Sun 16 March 02:00		BST begins	IST begins
1946	Sun 14 April 02:00	Sun 6 October 02:00		Back to GMT (Oct)
1945		Sun 7 October 02:00	Back to GMT	IST
1945	Mon 2 April 01:00	Sun 15 July 01:00	BDST (2 hours ahead)	IST / no DST
1944	Sun 2 April 01:00	Sun 17 September 01:00	BDST (2 hours ahead)	IST / no DST
1943	Sun 4 April 01:00	Sun 15 August 01:00	BDST (2 hours ahead)	IST / no DST
1942	Sun 5 April 01:00	Sun 9 August 01:00	BDST (2 hours ahead)	IST / no DST
1941	Sun 4 May 01:00	Sun 10 August 01:00	BDST (2 hours ahead)	IST / no DST
1940	Sun 25 February 02:00		BST 1940–1945	IST 1940–1946
1939	Sun 16 April 02:00	Sun 19 November 02:00		
1938	Sun 10 April 02:00	Sun 2 October 02:00		
1937	Sun 18 April 02:00	Sun 3 October 02:00		
1936	Sun 19 April 02:00	Sun 4 October 02:00		
1935	Sun 14 April 02:00	Sun 6 October 02:00		
1934	Sun 22 April 02:00	Sun 7 October 02:00		
1933	Sun 9 April 02:00	Sun 8 October 02:00		
1932	Sun 17 April 02:00	Sun 2 October 02:00		
1931	Sun 19 April 02:00	Sun 4 October 02:00		
1930	Sun 13 April 02:00	Sun 5 October 02:00		
1929	Sun 21 April 02:00	Sun 6 October 02:00		
1928	Sun 22 April 02:00	Sun 7 October 02:00		
1927	Sun 10 April 02:00	Sun 2 October 02:00		
1926	Sun 18 April 02:00	Sun 3 October 02:00		
1925	Sun 19 April 02:00	Sun 4 October 02:00		
1924	Sun 13 April 02:00	Sun 21 September 02:00		
1923	Sun 22 April 02:00	Sun 16 September 02:00		
1922	Sun 26 March 02:00	Sun 8 October 02:00		
1921	Sun 3 April 02:00	Sun 2 October 02:00		
1920	Sun 28 March 02:00	Sun 24 October 02:00		
1919	Sun 30 March 02:00	Sun 28 September 02:00		
1918	Sun 24 March 02:00	Sun 29 September 02:00		
1917	Sun 8 April 02:00	Sun 16 September 02:00		
1916	Sun 21 May 02:00	Sun 1 October 02:00		Abolition of DMT

Note: Until 1 October 1916 time in all of Ireland was based on Dublin Mean Time, GMT − 25 minutes.
