= List of fellows of the Royal Society elected in 1904 =

This is a list of fellows of the Royal Society elected in 1904.

== Fellows ==
- Charles Jasper Joly (1864–1906)
- Hugh Marshall (1868–1913)
- Donald Alexander Smith Baron Strathcona and Mount Royal (1820–1914)
- Thomas Gregor Brodie (1866–1916)
- Alexander Muirhead (1848–1920)
- Sir James Johnston Dobbie (1852–1924)
- Sir Arthur Everett Shipley (1861–1927)
- Harold William Taylor Wager (1862–1929)
- Alfred Cardew Dixon (1865–1936)
- George Henry Falkiner Nuttall (1862–1937)
- Edward Meyrick (1854–1938)
- Sir Sidney Gerald Burrard (1860–1943)
- William Whitehead Watts (1860–1947)
- Sir Thomas Henry Holland (1868–1947)
- Sir Gilbert Thomas Walker (1868–1958)
- Morris William Travers (1872–1961)
