= Plummer model =

Mathematical model in astronomical systems

The Plummer model or Plummer sphere is a density law that was first used by H. C. Plummer to fit observations of globular clusters. It is now often used as toy model in N-body simulations of stellar systems.

== Description of the model ==
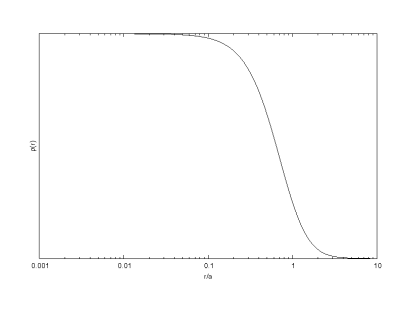
The density law of a Plummer model

The Plummer 3-dimensional density profile is given by
$$\rho_P(r) = \frac{3M_0}{4\pi a^3} \left(1 + \frac{r^2}{a^2}\right)^{-{5}/{2}} = \frac{3M_0a^2}{4\pi (a^2 + r^2)^{{5}/{2}}},$$
where $M_0$ is the total mass of the cluster, and a is the Plummer radius, a scale parameter that sets the size of the cluster core. The corresponding potential is
$$\Phi_P(r) = -\frac{G M_0}{\sqrt{r^2 + a^2}},$$
where G is Newton's gravitational constant. The velocity dispersion is
$$\sigma_P^2(r) = \frac{G M_0}{6\sqrt{r^2 + a^2}}.$$

The isotropic distribution function reads
$$f(\vec{x}, \vec{v}) = \frac{24\sqrt{2}}{7\pi^3} \frac{a^2}{G^5 M_0^4} (-E(\vec{x}, \vec{v}))^{7/2},$$
if $E < 0$, and $f(\vec{x}, \vec{v}) = 0$ otherwise, where $E(\vec{x}, \vec{v}) = \frac{1}{2} v^2 + \Phi_P(r)$ is the specific energy.

== Properties ==
The mass enclosed within radius $r$ is given by
$$M(<r) = 4\pi\int_0^r r'^2 \rho_P(r') \,dr' = M_0 \frac{r^3}{(r^2 + a^2)^{3/2}}.$$

Many other properties of the Plummer model are described in Herwig Dejonghe's comprehensive article.

Core radius $r_c$, where the surface density drops to half its central value, is at $r_c = a \sqrt{\sqrt{2} - 1} \approx 0.64 a$.

Half-mass radius is $r_h = \left(\frac{1}{0.5^{2/3}} - 1\right)^{-0.5} a \approx 1.3 a.$

Virial radius is $r_V = \frac{16}{3 \pi} a \approx 1.7 a$.

The 2D surface density is:
$$\Sigma(R) = \int_{-\infty}^{\infty}\rho(r(z))dz=2\int_{0}^{\infty}\frac{3a^2M_0dz}{4\pi(a^2+z^2+R^2)^{5/2}} = \frac{M_0a^2}{\pi(a^2+R^2)^2},$$
and hence the 2D projected mass profile is:
$$M(R)=2\pi\int_{0}^{R}\Sigma(R')\, R'dR'=M_0\frac{R^2}{a^2+R^2}.$$

In astronomy, it is convenient to define 2D half-mass radius which is the radius where the 2D projected mass profile is half of the total mass: $M(R_{1/2}) = M_0/2$.

For the Plummer profile: $R_{1/2} = a$.

The escape velocity at any point is
$$v_{\rm esc}(r)=\sqrt{-2\Phi(r)}=\sqrt{12}\,\sigma(r) ,$$

For bound orbits, the radial turning points of the orbit is characterized by specific energy $E = \frac{1}{2} v^2 + \Phi(r)$ and specific angular momentum $L = |\vec{r} \times \vec{v}|$ are given by the positive roots of the cubic equation
$$R^3 + \frac{GM_0}{E} R^2 - \left(\frac{L^2}{2E} + a^2\right) R - \frac{GM_0a^2}{E} = 0,$$
where $R = \sqrt{r^2 + a^2}$, so that $r = \sqrt{R^2 - a^2}$. This equation has three real roots for $R$: two positive and one negative, given that $L < L_c(E)$, where $L_c(E)$ is the specific angular momentum for a circular orbit for the same energy. Here $L_c$ can be calculated from single real root of the discriminant of the cubic equation, which is itself another cubic equation
$$\underline{E}\, \underline{L}_c^3 + \left(6 \underline{E}^2 \underline{a}^2 + \frac{1}{2}\right)\underline{L}_c^2 + \left(12 \underline{E}^3 \underline{a}^4 + 20 \underline{E} \underline{a}^2 \right) \underline{L}_c + \left(8 \underline{E}^4 \underline{a}^6 - 16 \underline{E}^2 \underline{a}^4 + 8 \underline{a}^2\right) = 0,$$
where underlined parameters are dimensionless in Henon units defined as $\underline{E} = E r_V / (G M_0)$, $\underline{L}_c = L_c / \sqrt{G M r_V}$, and $\underline{a} = a / r_V = 3 \pi/16$.

== Applications ==
The Plummer model comes closest to representing the observed density profiles of star clusters, although the rapid falloff of the density at large radii ($\rho\rightarrow r^{-5}$) is not a good description of these systems.

The behavior of the density near the center does not match observations of elliptical galaxies, which typically exhibit a diverging central density.

The ease with which the Plummer sphere can be realized as a Monte-Carlo model has made it a favorite choice of N-body experimenters, in spite of the model's lack of realism.
