= Henry Crozier Keating Plummer =

English astronomer

Henry Crozier Keating Plummer FRS FRAS (24 October 1875 – 30 September 1946) was an English astronomer.

== Early years and education ==
Born in Oxford, Plummer was the son of William Edward Plummer (1849–1928) and nephew of the distinguished astronomer John Isaac Plummer (1845–1925). He gained his education at St. Edward's School and then Hertford College at Oxford University. After studies in physics, he became a lecturer at Owen's College, Manchester, instructing in mathematics.

== Career ==
In 1900, he became an assistant at the Radcliffe Observatory, Oxford, where his father had served previously. He remained there for most of the next twelve years, spending one year at Lick Observatory as a Research Fellow.

In 1912, he was appointed to the position of Andrews Professor of Astronomy at Trinity College, Dublin, which carried with it the title of Royal Astronomer of Ireland. He was the last holder of both positions. He was the director of the Dunsink Observatory from 1912 to 1920.

He joined the Royal Military Academy, Woolwich in 1921, as professor of mathematics. He remained at Woolwich until he retired in 1940, becoming President of the Royal Astronomical Society from 1939 until 1941.

During his career, he contributed to the Astrographic Catalogue and contributed scientific papers. His investigations included photometric observations of short-period variables, and the radial pulsations of cepheid variables.

In 1911, he developed a gravitational potential function that can be used to model globular clusters and spherically symmetric galaxies, known as the Plummer potential. In 1918 he published the work, An Introductory Treatise on Dynamical Astronomy.

He also made studies of the history of science, and served on the Royal Society committee that was formed to publish the papers of Sir Isaac Newton.

== Awards and honours ==
- Fellow of the Royal Society, 1920
- Fellow of the Royal Astronomical Society, 1899.
- The crater Plummer on the Moon is named after him.

== Publications ==
- On the Theory of Aberration and the Principle of Relativity, 1910, Monthly Notices of the Royal Astronomical Society, Vol. 70, pp. 252–266
