= Arthur Rambaut =

Irish astronomer

Arthur Alcock Rambaut (21 September 1859 – 14 October 1923) was an Irish astronomer.

== Life ==
Rambaut was born in County Waterford, Ireland, the third son of Rev. Edmund F. Rambaut, vicar of Christ Church, Blackrock, Dublin. He was educated at Arlington House, Portarlington, The Royal School, Armagh and Trinity College, Dublin, where he won a scholarship in Natural Science in 1880.

In 1882, he became assistant to Robert S. Ball in Dunsink Observatory and took over as director from 1892 to 1897. When Ball moved to Cambridge, Rambaut took over as Andrews Professor of Astronomy and Royal Astronomer of Ireland. On the death of E. J. Stone in 1897, Rambaut became Radcliffe Observer in the University of Oxford. He remained in Oxford until his death.

He was awarded the BA (and gold medal) in mathematics in 1881, MA in 1887, and DSc in 1892.

He was elected a Fellow of the Royal Society in 1900 and served twice on the committee of the Royal Astronomical Society.

In 1883, he married Emily Longford, with whom he had three sons. He was a brother of the psychiatrist Daniel Frederick Rambaut.
