= 85 Pegasi =

Star in the constellation Pegasus

85 Pegasi A/B
Observation data Epoch J2000.0 Equinox ICRS
- Constellation: Pegasus
- Right ascension: 00^{h} 02^{m} 10.16^{s}
- Declination: +27° 04′ 56.1″
- Apparent magnitude (V): 5.75 / 8.89

Characteristics

A
- Evolutionary stage: subgiant
- Spectral type: G5IV

B
- Spectral type: K6-8V

Astrometry
| Proper motion (μ) | RA: 780.22 ± 2.01 mas/yr Dec.: -917.75 ± 1.20 mas/yr |
| Parallax (π) | 82.5±0.8 mas |
| Distance | 39.5 ± 0.4 ly (12.1 ± 0.1 pc) |
| Absolute magnitude (M_{V}) | 5.32 + 7.68 + 11.19 |

Orbit
| Secondary | 85 Pegasi B |
| Period (P) | 26.28 yr |
| Semi-major axis (a) | 0.83″ |
| Eccentricity (e) | 0.38 |
| Inclination (i) | 49° |

Details

A
| Mass | 0.75±0.01 M_{☉} |
| Radius | 0.948±0.011 R_{☉} |
| Luminosity | 0.712±0.011 L_{☉} |
| Surface gravity (log g) | 4.337±0.012 cgs |
| Temperature | 5,445±30 K |
| Metallicity [Fe/H] | −0.81 dex |
| Age | 9.3±0.5 Gyr; 9–11 Gyr |

Ba
| Mass | 0.72±0.05 M_{☉} |
| Radius | 0.512 R_{☉} |
| Luminosity | 0.074 L_{☉} |
| Surface gravity (log g) | 4.8±0.2 cgs |
| Temperature | 4,200±200 K |

Bb
| Mass | 0.14 M_{☉} |
| Radius | 0.155 R_{☉} |
| Luminosity | 0.003 L_{☉} |
| Surface gravity (log g) | 5.18 cgs |
| Temperature | 3,330 K |

Other designations
- BDS 12701, HR 9088, HD 224930, LFT 1848, LHS 101, LTT 17088, SAO 91669, HIP 171.
- 85 Pegasi A: ADS 17175 A, GJ 914 A, BD +26°4734 A, BU 733 A.
- 85 Pegasi B: ADS 17175 B, GJ 914 B, BD +26°4734 B, BU 733 B.

Database references
| SIMBAD | data |
| Exoplanet Archive | data |
| ARICNS | data |

85 Pegasi is a multiple star system 39.5 light years away in the constellation of Pegasus. The primary component is sixth magnitude 85 Pegasi A, which is a yellow dwarf like the Sun. The secondary component, 85 Pegasi B, is a ninth magnitude orange dwarf that takes 26.28 years to orbit at 10.3 AU around the primary in an elliptical orbit. The orbital distance ranges from 6.4 AU at periastron to 14.2 AU at apastron. 85 Pegasi B may itself be a binary, with a close, faint red dwarf companion (designated 85 Pegasi Bb) separated by 2 AU from the primary (designated 85 Pegasi Ba). The mass would be 11% solar mass (M_{☉}). All components in the star system including Star A are smaller, cooler and less massive, luminous, and metallic than the Sun and 51 Pegasi.

An infrared excess has been detected around the primary, most likely indicating the presence of a circumstellar disk at a radius of more than 97 AU. The temperature of this dust is below 25 K.
