= Time in the Republic of Ireland =

Time in Europe: Light Blue / Western European Time / Greenwich Mean Time (UTC); Blue / Western European Time / Greenwich Mean Time (UTC); Blue / Western European Summer Time / British Summer Time / Irish Standard Time (UTC+1); Red / Central European Time (UTC+1); Red / Central European Summer Time (UTC+2); Yellow / Eastern European Time / Kaliningrad Time (UTC+2); Ochre / Eastern European Time (UTC+2); Ochre / Eastern European Summer Time (UTC+3); Green / Moscow Time / Turkey Time (UTC+3); Turquoise / Armenia Time / Azerbaijan Time / Georgia Time / Samara Time (UTC+4); ▉▉▉▉ Pale hues: Standard time observed all year ▉▉▉ Dark hues: Daylight saving time

Ireland uses Irish Standard Time (IST, UTC+01:00; Irish: Am Caighdeánach Éireannach) in the summer months and Greenwich Mean Time (UTC±00:00; Irish: Meán-Am Greenwich) in the winter period.

The Standard Time Act 1968 legally established that "the time for general purposes in the State (to be known as standard time) shall be one hour in advance of Greenwich mean time throughout the year". This act was amended by the Standard Time (Amendment) Act 1971, which legally established Greenwich Mean Time as a winter time period. Ireland therefore operates one hour behind its statutory standard time during the winter period, and reverts to standard time in the summer months. This definition contrasts with the practice of other states in the European Union, which operate one hour ahead of their standard time during the summer period, but produces the same result. The net effect is that time in Ireland is the same as that in Portugal and the United Kingdom, as well as, during the winter months, Iceland.

The instant of transition to and from daylight saving time is synchronised across Europe. In Ireland, winter time begins at 02:00 IST on the last Sunday in October (changing the clocks to 01:00 GMT), and ends at 01:00 GMT on the last Sunday in March (changing to 02:00 IST).

== History ==
Timeball on the ballast office is down. Dunsink time.

— Leopold Bloom in Ulysses

Time (Ireland) Act 1916 (Note: Section 2.)
- Act of Parliament
- Parliament of the United Kingdom
- Long title: An Act to assimilate the Time adopted for use in Ireland to that adopted for use in Great Britain.
- Citation: 6 & 7 Geo. 5. c. 45
- Territorial extent: United Kingdom

Dates
- Royal assent: 23 August 1916
- Commencement: 23 August 1916 (Note: The Acts of Parliament (Commencement) Act 1793.)

Status: Amended

Text of statute as originally enacted

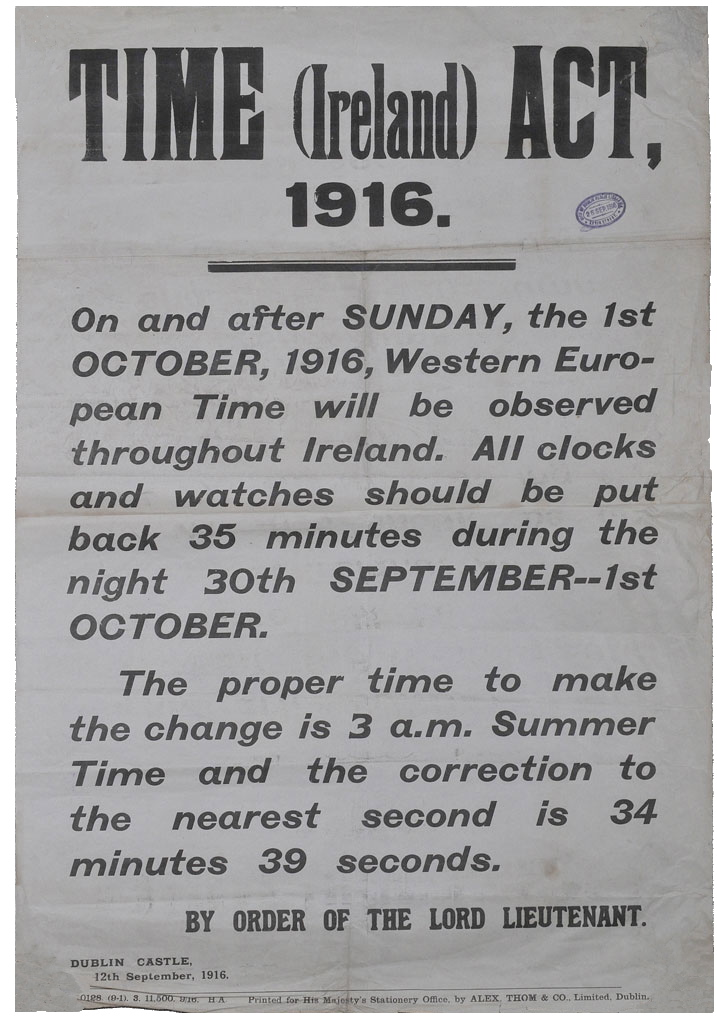
Time (Ireland) Act 1916

Before 1880, the legal time at any place in the United Kingdom of Great Britain and Ireland was defined as local mean time, as held by the appeal in the 1858 court case of Curtis v. March. The Statutes (Definition of Time) Act 1880 (43 & 44 Vict. c. 9) defined Dublin Mean Time as the legal time for Ireland. This was the local mean time at Dunsink Observatory outside Dublin, and was about 25 minutes 21 seconds behind Greenwich Mean Time (GMT), which was defined by the same act to be the legal time for Great Britain. After the Easter Rising, the time difference between Ireland and Britain was found inconvenient for telegraphic communication and the Time (Ireland) Act 1916 (6 & 7 Geo. 5. c. 45) provided that Irish time would be the same as British time, from 2:00 am Dublin Mean Time on Sunday 1 October 1916. Summer time (daylight saving time) had been introduced in May 1916 across the United Kingdom as a temporary efficiency measure for the First World War, and the changeover from Dublin time to Greenwich time was simultaneous with the changeover from summer time to winter time. John Dillon opposed the first reading of the Time (Ireland) Bill for having been introduced without consultation of the Irish Parliamentary Party; he said the different time in Ireland "reminds us that we are coming into a strange country". T. M. Healy opposed the second reading on the basis that "while the Daylight Saving Bill added to the length of your daylight, this Bill adds to the length of your darkness".

After the Irish Free State became independent in 1922, subsequent developments tended to mirror those in the United Kingdom. This avoided having different times on either side of the border with Northern Ireland. Summer time was provided on a one-off basis by the Summer Time Act 1923 and the Summer Time Act 1924, and then on an ongoing basis by the Summer Time Act 1925. The 1925 act provided a default summer time period, which could be varied by ministerial order. Double summer time was considered but not introduced during the Emergency of World War II. As a consequence, following the introduction of double summer time in the United Kingdom in 1940, time in Northern Ireland was one hour ahead of the Republic of Ireland throughout the year until the UK returned to GMT in the autumn of 1947.

From 1968 standard time (GMT+01:00) was observed all year round, with no winter time change. This was an experiment in the run-up to Ireland's 1973 accession to the EEC, and was undone in 1971. In those years, time in Ireland was the same as in the six EEC countries, except in the summer in Italy, which switched to Central European Summer Time (CEST). One artefact of the 1968 legislation is that "standard time" legally refers to summer time; the Standard Time (Amendment) Act 1971 defined a period of time in the winter as "winter time" during which the time observed would be GMT, leaving "standard time" unchanged.

From the 1980s, the dates of switch between winter and summer time have been synchronised across the European Union.

=== Orders ===
The statutory instruments (SIs) that have been issued under the Standard Time Acts are listed below, in the format year/SI-number, and linking to the Irish Statute Database text of the SI. Except where stated, those issued up to 1967 (under the 1925 act) were called "Summer Time Order <year>", while those issued from 1981 (under the Standard Time (Amendment) Act 1971) are "Winter Time Order <year>".

1926/(unnumbered), 1947/71, 1948/128, 1949/23, 1950/41, 1951/27, 1952/73, 1961/11, 1961/232 (Summer Time (No. 2) Order 1961), 1962/182, 1963/167, 1964/257, 1967/198, 1981/67, 1982/212, 1986/45, 1988/264, 1990/52, 1992/371, 1994/395, 1997/484, 2001/506

== Possible changes ==
Recent past and possible near-future starting and ending dates
| Year | Start | End |
|---|---|---|
| 2023 | 26 March | 29 October |
| 2024 | 31 March | 27 October |
| 2025 | 30 March | 26 October |
| 2026 | 29 March | 25 October |
| 2027 | 28 March | 31 October |
| 2028 | 26 March | 29 October |
| 2029 | 25 March | 28 October |
| 2030 | 31 March | 27 October |

Possible adjustments to the Irish practice were discussed by the Oireachtas joint committee on Justice, Defence and Equality in November 2011, but the government stated it had no plans to change. In November 2012, Tommy Broughan introduced a private member's bill to permit a three-year trial of advancing time by one hour, to CET in winter and CEST in summer. Debate on the bill's second stage was adjourned on 5 July 2013, when Alan Shatter, the Minister for Justice and Equality, agreed to refer the matter to the joint committee for review, and suggested that it consult with the British parliament and devolved assemblies. In July 2014, the joint committee issued an invitation for submissions on the bill.

On 8 February 2018, the European Parliament voted to ask the European Commission to re-evaluate the principle of Summer Time in Europe. After a web survey showing high support for not switching clocks twice annually (84 percent support in the EU overall; 88 percent in Ireland), on 12 September 2018 the European Commission decided to propose that an end be put to seasonal clock changes (repealing Directive 2000/84/EC) In order for this to be valid, the European Union legislative procedure must be followed, mainly that the Council of the European Union and the European Parliament must both approve the proposal. The United Kingdom left the EU on 31 January 2020 and, if the UK does not follow the reform and continues to operate summer/winter time, Northern Ireland will have a one-hour time difference for half the year either with the rest of Ireland or with the United Kingdom. As this would add a further complication to the Irish border question, it remains to be seen what action the Irish Government would take should this happen. The Department of Justice and Equality ran a consultation on seasonal clock changes in November 2018. As of September 2018, the UK Government "has no plans" to end daylight saving. In July 2019, the Minister for Justice and Equality announced that while there was support for ending daylight saving time, the proposal was not straightforward and Ireland would oppose the end of seasonal clock changes. The Justice Department announcement cited a "representative opinion poll" which revealed that "82% of public were not in favour of different time zones between Ireland and Northern Ireland". At the same time, a report of an interdepartmental working group on the proposal was published, along with submissions to the consultation on seasonal clock changes.

Seán Kelly, MEP, has been lobbying to end the bi-annual clock change in the EU, but is in favour of Ireland adopting year round summer time or Central European Time instead of its present, closer to solar time, Western European Time. Roughly two-thirds of the Republic is located west of the 7.5°W meridian. Thus the local mean time in most of Ireland is closer to UTC-01:00 timezone than to GMT: to adopt CET/CEST would place 'clock time' an average of 90 minutes ahead of solar time.

== Other laws ==
Closing time in Irish public houses was half an hour later during summer time (23:30 instead of 23:00). In 2000, the closing time hours were simplified by removing summer/winter time changes. Between 1933 and 1961, lighting-up time was an hour before/after sunrise/sunset in summer-time, as opposed to half an hour in winter time. Since 1961, it has been half an hour in all cases. A similar change in the definition of night for aviation was made in 1967.

== IANA time zone database ==
The IANA time zone database contains one zone for Ireland in the file zone.tab, named Europe/Dublin.
