= Dublin Mean Time =

Former time zone in Ireland (1880–1916)

- Time zone
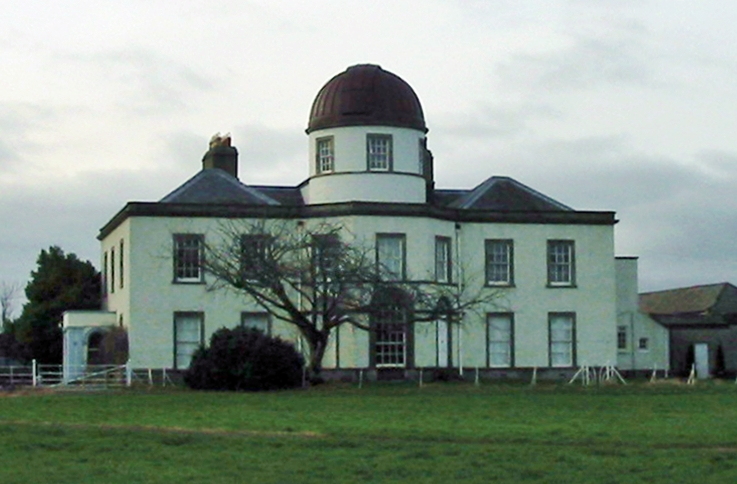
- Dunsink Observatory

UTC offset
- UTC: Dublin Mean Time

Current time
- :: UTC−00:25:21 [refresh]

Dublin Mean Time was an identifier for a time offset of UT−00:25:21, i.e. twenty-five minutes and twenty-one seconds behind Greenwich Mean Time. This time is the local mean time at Dunsink Observatory and was official time in Ireland between 1880 and 1916.

== History ==
Dublin Mean Time was introduced by the Statutes (Definition of Time) Act 1880 (43 & 44 Vict. c. 9), which also defined Greenwich Mean Time (GMT) as legal time in Great Britain. This act replaced local mean time, which had been the legal time since Curtis v. March in 1858, throughout the United Kingdom of Great Britain and Ireland.

From 3:00 DST on 1 October 1916, the Time (Ireland) Act 1916 (6 & 7 Geo. 5. c. 45) changed the time used in Ireland to be the same as that used in Great Britain, both during and outside daylight saving time.

== See also ==
- Time in the Republic of Ireland
