= Dublin Institute for Advanced Studies =

Irish educational institution and academic publisher

Coordinates: 53.3313°N 6.2457°W

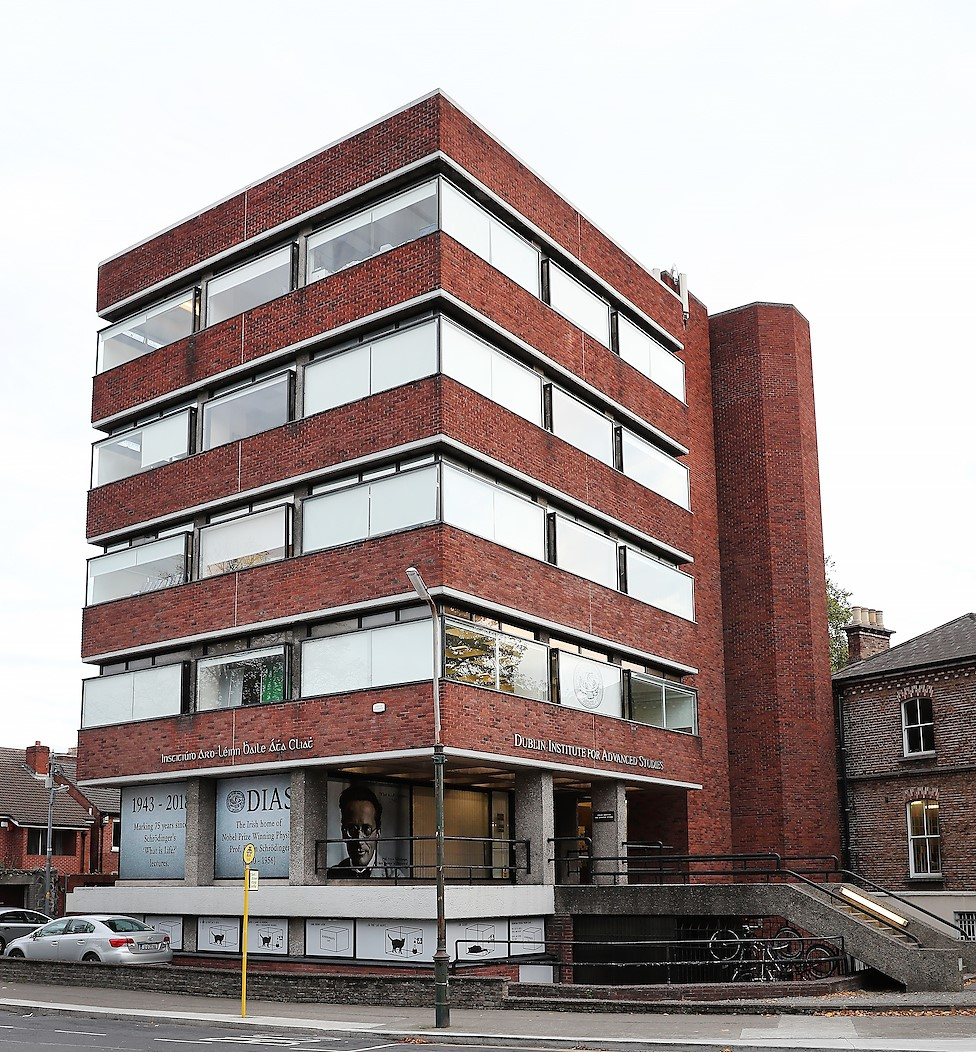
- Dublin Institute for Advanced Studies, School of Theoretical Physics
- Abbreviation: DIAS
- Formation: 1940
- Location: DIAS Headquarters, 10 Burlington Road, D04 C932, Dublin, Ireland
- Region served: Ireland
- Registrar and CEO: Eucharia Meehan MRIA
- Website: www.dias.ie

The Dublin Institute for Advanced Studies (DIAS) (Irish: Institiúid Ard-Léinn Bhaile Átha Cliath) is a statutory independent research institute in Dublin, Ireland. It was established, under the Institute For Advanced Studies Act 1940, by the government of the then Taoiseach, Éamon de Valera.

The institute consists of three schools: the School of Theoretical Physics, the School of Cosmic Physics and the School of Celtic Studies. The directors of these schools were, as of 2023, Professor Denjoe O'Connor, Professor Tom Ray and Professor Ruairí Ó hUiginn. The institute, under its governing act, is empowered to "train students in methods of advanced research" but does not itself award degrees; graduate students working under the supervision of Institute researchers can, with the agreement of the governing board of the appropriate school, be registered for a higher degree in any university worldwide.

Following a comprehensive review of the higher education sector and its institutions, conducted by the Higher Education Authority for the Minister for Education and Skills in 2013, DIAS was approved to remain an independent institute carrying out fundamental research. It appointed a new CEO, Dr Eucharia Meehan, formerly director of the Irish Research Council, in the summer of 2017.

== History ==
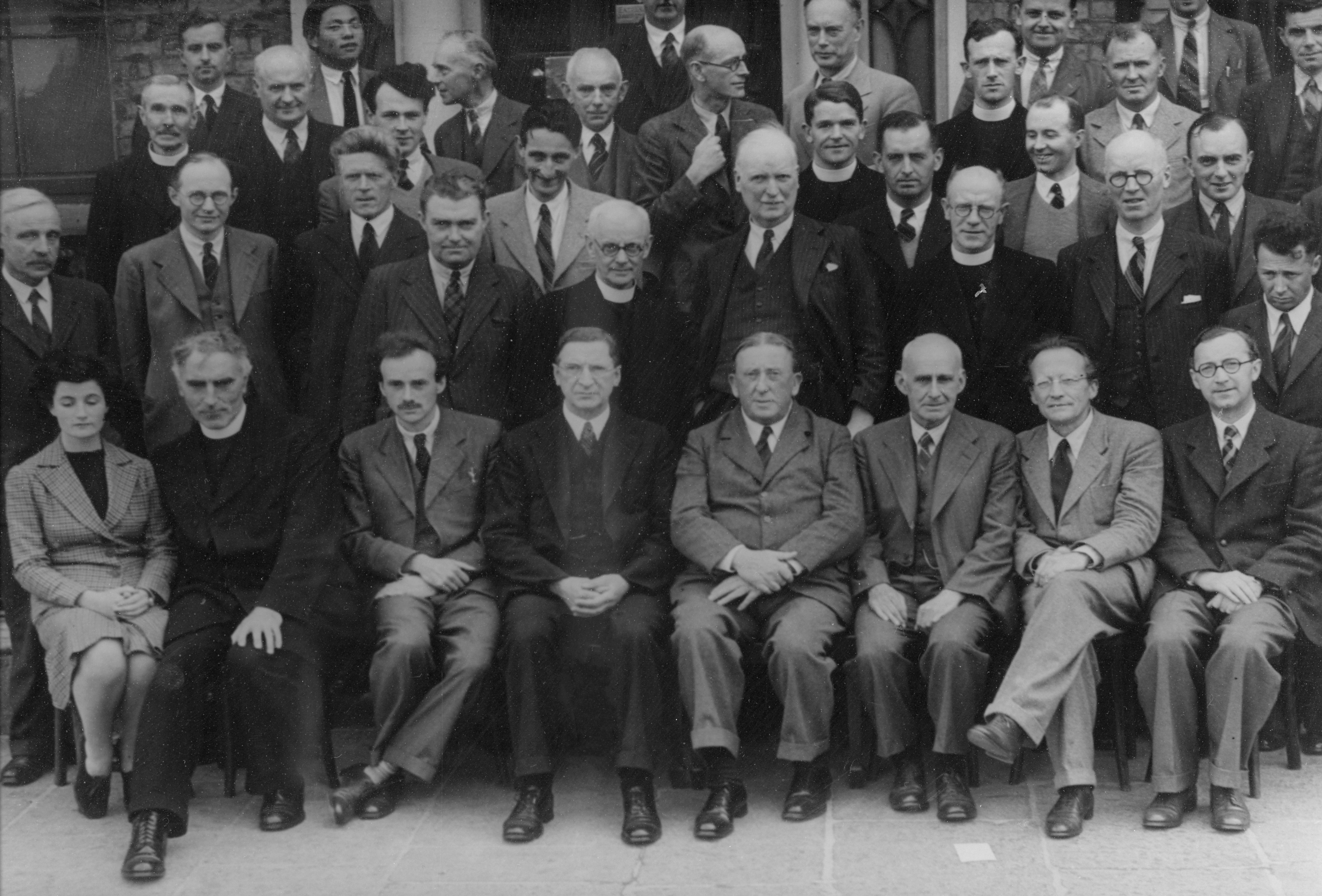
A group, at DIAS in 1942, which includes in its front row (from left): Sheila Tinney, Pádraig de Brún, Paul Dirac, Éamon de Valera, Arthur W. Conway, Arthur Eddington, Erwin Schrödinger, Albert Joseph McConnell

=== Context ===
After becoming Taoiseach in 1937, Éamon de Valera investigated the possibility of setting up an institute of higher learning. De Valera was aware of the decline of the Dunsink Observatory, where Sir William Rowan Hamilton and others had held the position of Royal Astronomer of Ireland. Following meetings with prominent academics in the fields of mathematics and astronomy, he came to the conclusion that astronomy at Dunsink should be revived and an institute for higher learning should be established. The institute was and is modelled on the Institute for Advanced Study in Princeton, New Jersey, which was founded in 1930, and theoretical physics was still the research subject in 1940. The School of Celtic Studies owes its founding to the importance de Valera accorded to the Irish language. He considered it a vital element in the makeup of the nation, and therefore important that the nation should have a place of higher learning devoted to this subject.

In July 1939, de Valera (then Taoiseach and Minister for Education) introduced a bill to the Dáil to "make provision for the establishment and maintenance in Dublin of an Institute for Advanced Studies". This bill was passed by the Oireachtas and the Dublin Institute for Advanced Studies (DIAS) was founded under the Institute for Advanced Studies Act, 1940. As set out in the 1940 Act, "the functions of the Institute shall be to provide facilities for the furtherance of advanced study and the conduct of research in specialised branches of knowledge and for the publication of results of advanced study and research".

=== Early phase ===
The institute was initially located at 64 and 65 Merrion Square and had two schools - the School of Theoretical Physics and the School of Celtic Studies - to which the School of Cosmic Physics was added in 1947. As of 2025, the institute's schools are located at four premises, on the Southside of Dublin, at 10 Burlington Road, 31 Fitzwilliam Place, 5 Merrion Square, and Dunsink Observatory in north County Dublin.

Work by the Geophysics section of the School of Cosmic Physics on the formation of the North Atlantic demonstrated that the Irish continental shelf extended much further than previously thought, thereby more than doubling the area of the seabed over which Ireland can claim economic exploitation rights under the international law of the sea. In addition to geophysical research, the Geophysics Section maintains the Irish National Seismic Network (INSN). Fundamental work in statistical mechanics by the School of Theoretical Physics has found application in computer switching technology and led to the establishment of an Irish campus company to exploit this intellectual property. The institute has also been one of the main agents helping to set up a modern e-Infrastructure in support of all Irish research.

In 1968, the Royal Society recognised de Valera's contribution to science in establishing the institute by electing him to an honorary fellowship.

=== 21st century ===
In July 2009, in response to the post-2008 downturn, the report of the Special Group on Public Service Numbers and Expenditure Programmes (also known as the "McCarthy Report") suggested that the institute be amalgamated into either University College Dublin or Trinity College Dublin. The McCarthy Report noted that 79 staff members were paid €6.7m by the Exchequer, an average of nearly €85,000 per person per annum. However, the audited accounts contained in the annual report for 2009 showed that the exchequer pay grant included a figure of just over €1m on pensions as well as smaller sums for visitors and that the actual "salaries and wages" figure was €5.1m bringing the average down to €65k.

Subsequently, in the comprehensive review of the higher education sector and its institutions, conducted by the Higher Education Authority in 2013, it was proposed that "In the case of the Dublin Institute for Advanced Studies... no structural change be made to this statutory, independent research institute". However, it was stated that "responsibility for allocation of funding to the institute will be transferred from the Department of Education and Skills to the Higher Education Authority". The then Minister for Education and Skills accepted this proposal as part of the broader reconfiguration of the higher education system. As of Spring 2018, DIAS remained an independent body reporting to the Department of Education and Skills.

== Status and staffing ==
As of 2022, the institute had 115 team members, 96 of whom were directly engaged in advanced studies/research and 19 in general administration/support and non-research roles. 59% of early-stage career researchers were funded by external competitively sourced funding. DIAS researchers in 2022 hailed from 24 countries across the world.

== Schools and academic work ==
=== School of Celtic Studies ===
==== History ====
The School of Celtic Studies (Irish: Scoil an Léinn Cheiltigh) was created in 1940 as one of the two founding schools of the Dublin Institute for Advanced Studies. Its first director was Osborn Bergin. Other notable scholars to have worked at the school have included T. F. O'Rahilly, Daniel Binchy, Cecile O'Rahilly, R. I. Best, James Carney, Myles Dillon, Proinsias Mac Cana, Brian Ó Cuív, Breandán Ó Buachalla and Roparz Hemon.

As of 2025, the director of the School of Celtic Studies is Ruairí Ó hUiginn. It is located at 10 Burlington Road in Dublin 4.

==== Research ====
The school's remit covers all Celtic languages and all periods. The bulk of its research has been on the history of the Irish language and its literature from the earliest times onwards. Among the school's core duties are: the cataloguing of Irish manuscripts; the publishing of Irish texts from the manuscripts; the study of the grammar and development of Irish over time; the recording and study of spoken Irish dialects; the contribution of literature in Irish to the history of Irish society (for example, the early Irish law tracts); and similar research within the other Celtic languages.

The School of Celtic Studies runs the Irish Script on Screen Project (ISOS), which makes available digital images of Irish manuscripts from libraries around the world. The ‘Ogham in 3D Project’ aims to capture and catalogue 3D-digital images of all early medieval inscriptions in the ogham alphabet. The school maintains an electronic Bibliography of Irish Linguistics and Literature. Its website also hosts the independent projects, Monasticon Hibernicum and the Bardic Poetry Database.

The school also acts as a publishing house for Celtic studies. It has its own journal, Celtica, which was founded in 1946 and publishes research in various areas of Celtic studies. Celtica was previously published at irregular intervals but, from 2016, became an annual publication appearing every November. The library of the school is open to academics and advanced students on application.

There is a three-yearly summer school which offers courses in Old Irish, Early Modern Irish and Middle Welsh. The School of Celtic Studies also hosts occasional day conferences, and an annual conference known as Tionól ("gathering") which takes place in November. The school offers O'Donovan Scholarships to researchers. These are tenable for three years, and there are usually four at any one time. The Bergin Fellowship is offered to slightly more senior researchers and lasts for five years.

=== School of Theoretical Physics ===
==== History ====
The School of Theoretical Physics initially consisted of just one member, Professor Erwin Schrödinger, who moved into 65 Merrion Square in February 1941. Schrödinger began his duties as director of the school by giving two courses on quantum theory. Up to this time, there had not been courses of this level available in Ireland. The lecture series were at two levels, the lower level including introductory wave mechanics, perturbation theory of quantum mechanical systems, spin of the electron and Dirac's relativistic wave equation. The higher level provided an introduction to the research being performed at the school. In June 1941, Schrödinger was joined by Walter Heitler, who took the position of assistant professor. Heitler gave a course of lectures designed to introduce students to the quantum theory of the chemical bond. These lectures brought together staff and students of third-level establishments in the Dublin area, exposing them to twentieth-century theoretical physics. Members of the mathematical community at the time seized the opportunity to hear the lectures of Schrödinger and Heitler, and within a few years, the material covered began to find its way into undergraduate university courses.

One of the objectives de Valera had in mind when he founded the institute was to provide a meeting place for scholars from University College Dublin and Trinity College Dublin. For reasons both historical and religious, the academic contacts between the two institutions had previously been non-existent. (A quarter of a century later, a proposed conjoining of the two institutions, put forward by Donogh O'Malley in the abortive Universities Mergers Bill 1967, was strongly opposed by both universities and was ultimately defeated.)

==== Research ====
In its early years, the research of the school mainly focused on non-linear field theory, meson theory, general relativity and geometry. Mesons, which Heitler began researching when he arrived in 1941, were at the time believed to be the fundamental particles of the strong interaction. In 1948, John Lighton Synge was appointed senior professor, whose research interests were general relativity and geometry. Later research involved numerical analysis due to the addition of Cornelius Lanczos to the faculty and the development of the computer. Lochlainn O'Raifeartaigh made contributions in the application of symmetries in theoretical particle physics and John T. Lewis had interests including Bose–Einstein condensation and Large deviations theory.

The school has three senior professors at present: Tony Dorlas, Denjoe O'Connor and Sergei Gukov. Dorlas has worked on a lattice model of a boson gas called the Bose–Hubbard model, on models of a spin glass and on Anderson localisation in quasi-one-dimensional systems, and also on quantum information theory. O'Connor has worked on noncommutative geometry and applications to quantum field theory, especially as an alternative to lattice field theory, and on crossover phenomena and the renormalisation group.

=== School of Cosmic Physics ===
==== History ====
The School of Cosmic Physics was added to DIAS in 1947, partially at the prompting of Walter Heitler in the School of Theoretical Physics, who wanted to have contact with experimental cosmic ray studies for his work on meson physics. It was also partially in response to a proposal prepared by Leo Wenzel Pollak, then working for the Irish Meteorological Service in Foynes, who argued the need for a geophysical research centre in Ireland. It was also established to fulfil Éamon de Valera's ambition to save Dunsink Observatory and its scientific heritage. The new school had three main areas of research; astronomy based in Dunsink Observatory, and geophysics and cosmic ray studies based in 5 Merrion Square. The chair of the School of Cosmic Physics from 1970 to 1995 was Edward F. Fahy.

The first Head of Astronomy was Hermann Brück, who established a program of solar near-UV spectroscopy and photo-electric stellar photometry. Geophysics was headed by Leo Wenzel Pollak who worked mainly on atmospheric aerosol physics in close collaboration with the Nolan brothers in UCD. Attempts were made to persuade the Austrian Nobel laureate Victor Francis Hess to come to Dublin as first head of the Cosmic Ray section, but in the end, he declined and the position was offered to a Hungarian physicist, Lajos Janossy, who came from Patrick Blackett's laboratory in Manchester and worked on what would now be called air shower physics.

The school was central to what was the first inter-governmental agreement between the two parts of Ireland, and the first international agreement to operate a shared observing facility in the southern hemisphere, when it entered into the Armagh-Dunsink-Harvard agreement (signed in 1947) to operate a large Schmidt telescope at the Boyden Observatory in South Africa. The school was also involved with the first Irish experiments to fly on space missions as cosmic ray experiments, in collaboration with the University of California, Berkeley were flown to the moon on the Apollo 16 and Apollo 17 missions. The school pioneered, in collaboration with the University of Hamburg, a seismic study of the North Atlantic resulting in the discovery that the Irish continental shelf extended much further out than previously thought, with potentially significant economic benefits for Ireland.

More recently the school has, with funding from the Programme for Research in Third Level Institutions (PRTLI) cycles 3 and 4, invested in a shared national research e-infrastructure culminating in the establishment of the Irish Centre for High-End Computing (ICHEC)

In November 2009, the then Minister for Foreign Affairs, Micheál Martin, agreed to the establishment of the National Data Centre (NDC) for the Preparatory Commission for the Comprehensive Nuclear-Test-Ban Treaty Organization (CTBTO) within the Geophysics Section of DIAS. It was officially opened on Friday, 22 June 2012. The NDC receives data from the seismic stations that support the Comprehensive Nuclear-Test-Ban Treaty (CTBT).

==== Research ====
Over the years, the various sections of the School of Cosmic Physics have changed their research areas in response to changes in the interests of senior staff as well as the changing external environment. The cosmic ray section eventually evolved into a theoretical astrophysics section with a strong emphasis on high-energy, non-thermal phenomena as well as star formation and was combined with the astronomy section into a single astronomy and astrophysics Section. The geophysics section moved away from its beginnings in atmospheric physics work and concentrated on solid earth geophysics with an emphasis on seismic studies.

Current areas of research in astronomy and astrophysics include star and planet formation, evolution of massive stars, high-energy phenomenology and astroparticle physics (building on the historical legacy in cosmic ray physics). Solar physics, Space Weather, and Solar System Planetary Magnetospheres and Moons are among the topics studied by DIAS researchers at Dunsink Observatory. The Astronomy and Astrophysics section is led by Prof. Peter T. Gallagher, who leads the Solar Physics and Space Weather research group and is Director of Dunsink Observatory. Prof Caitríona M. Jackman leads the Planetary Magnetospheres research group.

Geophysics research includes global teleseismic studies of the whole Earth, seismic studies of volcanoes, detailed studies of the Earth's gravitational and magnetic fields using satellite and ground-based data, and local surveys in Ireland and elsewhere exploring fundamental geophysical processes using a variety of techniques.

DIAS and Geological Survey Ireland operate the Irish National Seismic Network together.

== See also ==
- Quantum mechanics
- Category:Academics of the Dublin Institute for Advanced Studies
- Irish studies
