= Tony O'Farrell =

Irish mathematician

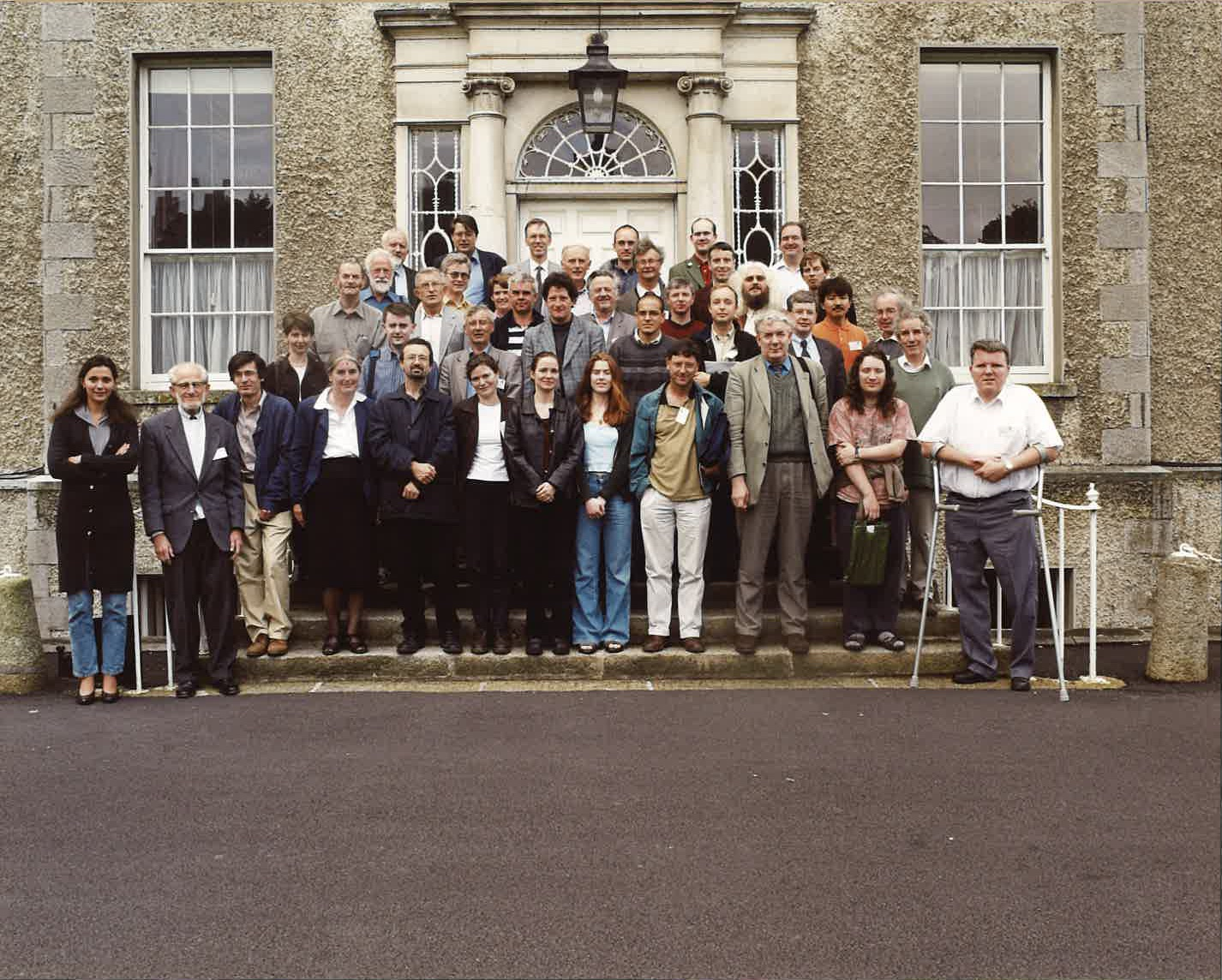
- Irish Mathematics Society Annual meeting in Maynooth in 2000. O'Farrell is 4th from right in the front row.
- Born: Anthony G. O'Farrell; 1947 (age 78–79); Dublin, Ireland
- Education: Brown University; University College Dublin
- Scientific career
- Fields: Mathematics
- Workplaces: University of California, Los Angeles
- Thesis: Capacities in Uniform Approximation (1973)
- Doctoral advisor: Brian Cole

Tony O'Farrell (born Anthony G. O'Farrell in 1947 in Dublin) is an Irish mathematician who is Professor Emeritus at Maynooth University. He has been in the Mathematics and Statistics Department there since 1975.

== Early life ==
He was born in Dublin and grew up both there and in Tipperary.

== Education and career ==
He attended University College Dublin (UCD) earning a BSc in mathematical science (1967). After a year working for the Irish Meteorological Service, he returned to UCD for his MSc (1969). He then moved to the USA, to Brown University from which he earned a PhD in 1973, for a thesis on "Capacities in Uniform Approximation" done under Brian Cole. After two years at the University of California, Los Angeles (UCLA), during which he published extensively, in 1975 he returned to Ireland as Professor of Mathematics at St. Patrick's College, Maynooth (later Maynooth University), outside Dublin. This appointment was notable for two reasons: he was only 28, and, while Maynooth had lay lecturers and senior lecturers, he was the first layman appointed to a chair at this traditionally pontifical institution.

O'Farrell has long been active in the Irish Mathematical Society, serving as president in 1983 and 1984, and as editor of the Bulletin of the IMS since 2011.

In 1981 he was elected to the Royal Irish Academy.

From 1992-1995, he also served as head of the Computer Science Department at Maynooth.

In 2002, O'Farrell established Logic Press which publishes mathematics books at various levels in both English and Irish. These range from the Irish Mathematical Olympiad Manual to undergraduate and postgraduate level texts and research monographs.

In 2012, he formally retired from Maynooth, though he remains very active in many arenas.

== Hamilton Walk ==
In 1990 O’Farrell established the annual Hamilton Walk, which commemorates the 16 October 1843 discovery of quaternions by William Rowan Hamilton. It starts at Dunsink Observatory in County Dublin, just west of the city, and follows the Royal Canal east to Broom Bridge. Over the decades, this has grown in popularity and stature, attracting Nobel laureates and Fields Medallists. O'Farrell's younger colleague Fiacre Ó Cairbre took over the organisation of the walk at the end of the 1990s, but O'Farrell always gives a speech at Broom Bridge. In 2018, O’Farrell and Ó Cairbre received the 2018 Maths Week Ireland Award, for "outstanding work in raising public awareness of mathematics" resulting from the founding and nurturing the Hamilton Walk.

== Selected papers ==
- 1973 "An isolated bounded point derivation", Proceedings AMS 39 (1973) 559-562.
- 1974 "A generalized Walsh-Lebesgue theorem", Proc. Roy. Soc. Edinburgh 73A(1974/75) 231-234.
- 1977 "Hausdorff content and rational approximation in fractional Lipschitz norms", Transactions AMS 228 (1977) 187-206.
- 1976 "Sobolev approximation by a sum of subalgebras on the circle" (with J.B. Garnett), Pacific J. Math. 65 (1976) 55-63.
- 1983 "Approximation by a sum of two algebras. The lightning bolt principle" (with D. Marshall). Journal of Functional Analysis, 52 (1983) 353-368.
- 1984 "Approximation by polynomials in two diffeomorphisms" (with K.J. Preskenis), Bulletin AMS, 10 (1984) 105-107
- 1986 "$C^\infty$ maps may increase $C^\infty$ dimension", Inventiones Math. 89 (1987) 663-668. MR 89d: 58022. A preprint appeared as IHES preprint M/86/47 (1986).
- 1992 "The tangent stars of a set, and extensions of smooth functions" (with R.O. Watson), J. für die Reine und Angew. Math., 430 (1992) 109-137. Announced in: Bulletin IMS 26 (1991) 10-1. MR 93h:58015.
- 1997 "An example on Sobolev space approximation", Bulletin L.M.S., 29 (1997) 470-4.
- 1998 "Finitely-generated algebras of smooth functions in one dimension" (with G. Allan, G. Kakiko and R. Watson), J. Functional Analysis, 158 (1998) 458-74.
- 2000 "Pervasive algebras of analytic functions" (with I. Netuka and A. Sanabria), J. Approx. Theory, 106 (2000) 262-75.
- 2002 "De Paepe's disc has nontrivial polynomial hull" (with A. Sanabria), Bull. LMS, 34 (2002) 490-4.

== Selected books ==
- 2015 Analysis Zero, Logic Press
- 2005 Introduction to Maple Programming, Kilcock
- 2015 Reversibility in Dynamics and Group Theory, (with Ian Short), Cambridge University Press (LMS Lecture Note Series 416)
