= Conical refraction =

Optical phenomenon

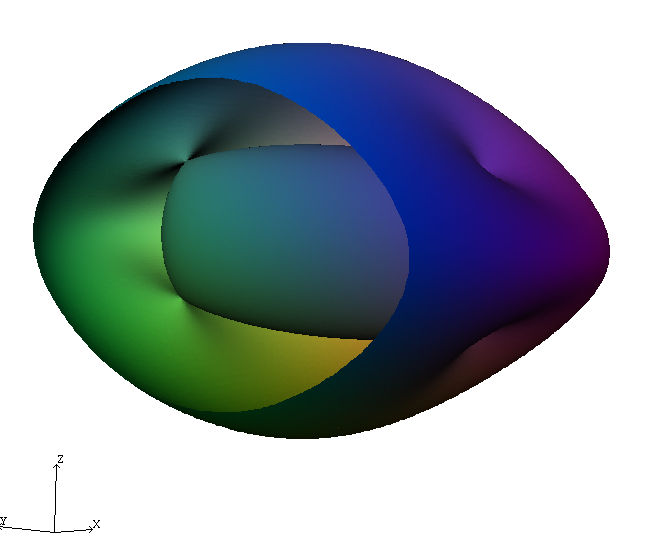
Surface of wavevectors when three principal refractive indices are $1, 0.5, 1.5$.

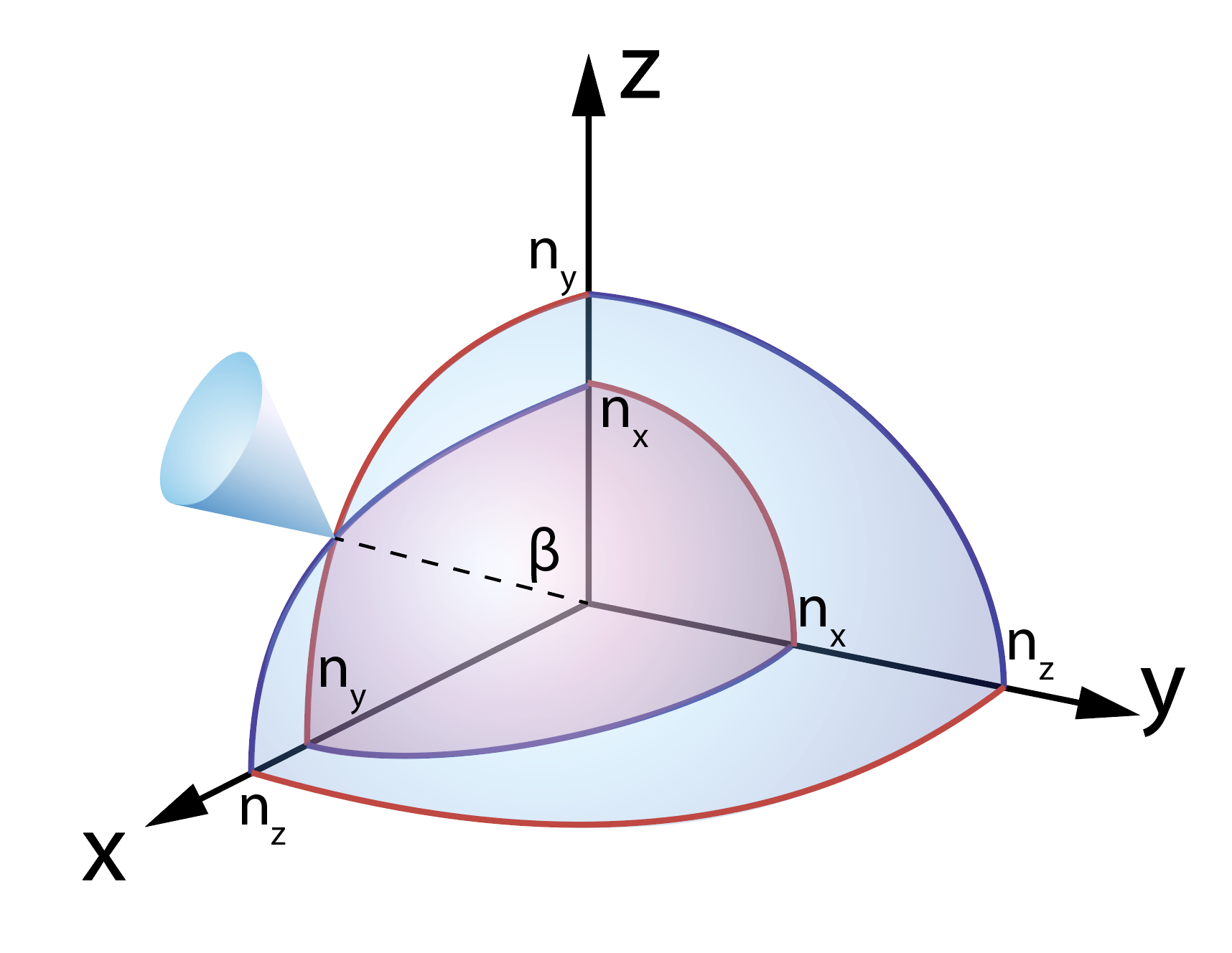
The surface of wavevectors. It has two sheets that intersect at 4 conoidal points.

Conical refraction is an optical phenomenon in which a ray of light, passing through a biaxial crystal along certain directions, is refracted into a hollow cone of light. There are two possible conical refractions, one internal and one external. For internal refraction, there are 4 directions, and for external refraction, there are 4 other directions.

For internal conical refraction, a planar wave of light enters an aperture a slab of biaxial crystal whose face is parallel to the plane of light. Inside the slab, the light splits into a hollow cone of light rays. Upon exiting the slab, the hollow cone turns into a hollow cylinder.

For external conical refraction, light is focused at a single point aperture on the slab of biaxial crystal, and exits the slab at the other side at an exit point aperture. Upon exiting, the light splits into a hollow cone.

This effect was predicted in 1832 by William Rowan Hamilton and subsequently observed by Humphrey Lloyd in the next year. It was possibly the first example of a phenomenon predicted by mathematical reasoning and later confirmed by experiment.

== History ==
The phenomenon of double refraction was discovered in the Iceland spar (calcite), by Erasmus Bartholin in 1669. It was initially explained by Christiaan Huygens using a wave theory of light. The explanation was a centerpiece of his Treatise on Light (1690). However, his theory was limited to uniaxial crystals, and could not account for the behavior of biaxial crystals. inside the sphere.

In 1813, David Brewster discovered that topaz has two axes of no double refraction, and subsequently others, such as aragonite, borax, and mica, were identified as biaxial. Explaining this was beyond Huygens' theory.

At the same period, Augustin-Jean Fresnel developed a more comprehensive theory that could describe double refraction in both uniaxial and biaxial crystals. Fresnel had already derived the equation for the wavevector surface in 1823, and André-Marie Ampère rederived it in 1828. Many others investigated the wavevector surface of the biaxial crystal, but they all missed its physical implications. In particular, Fresnel mistakenly thought the two sheets of the wavevector surface are tangent at the singular points (by a mistaken analogy with the case of uniaxial crystals), rather than conoidal.

William Rowan Hamilton, in his work on Hamiltonian optics, discovered the wavevector surface has four conoidal points and four tangent conics. These conoidal points and tangent conics imply that, under certain conditions, a ray of light could be refracted into a cone of light within the crystal. He termed this phenomenon "conical refraction" and predicted two distinct types: internal and external conical refraction, corresponding respectively to the conoidal points and tangent conics.

Hamilton announced his discovery at the Royal Irish Academy on October 22, 1832. He then asked Humphrey Lloyd to prove this experimentally. Lloyd observed external conical refraction on 14 December with a specimen of aragonite from the Dollonds, which he published in February. He then observed internal conical refraction and published it in March. Lloyd then combined both reports and added details into one paper.

Lloyd discovered experimentally that the refracted rays are polarized, with polarization angle half that of the turning angle (see below), and told Hamilton about it, who then explained theoretically.

At the same time, Hamilton also exchanged letters with George Biddell Airy. Airy had independently discovered that the two sheets touch at conoidal points (rather than tangentially), but he was skeptical that this would have experimental consequences. He was only convinced after Lloyd's report.

This discovery was a significant victory for the wave theory of light and solidified Fresnel's theory of double refraction. Lloyd's experimental data are described in pages 350–355.

The rays of the internal cone emerged, as they ought, in a cylinder from the second face of the crystal; and the size of this nearly circular cylinder, though small, was decidedly perceptible, so that with solar light it threw on silver paper a little luminous ring, which seemed to remain the same at different distances of the paper from the arragonite.

In 1833, James MacCullagh claimed that it is a special case of a theorem he published in 1830 that he did not explicate, since it was not relevant to that particular paper. Augustin-Louis Cauchy discovered the same surface in the context of classical mechanics.

Somebody having remarked, "I know of no person who has not seen conical refraction that really believed in it. I have myself converted a score of mathematicians by showing them the cone of light". Hamilton replied, "How different from me! If I had seen it only, I should not have believed it. My eyes have too often deceived me. I believe it, because I have proved it."

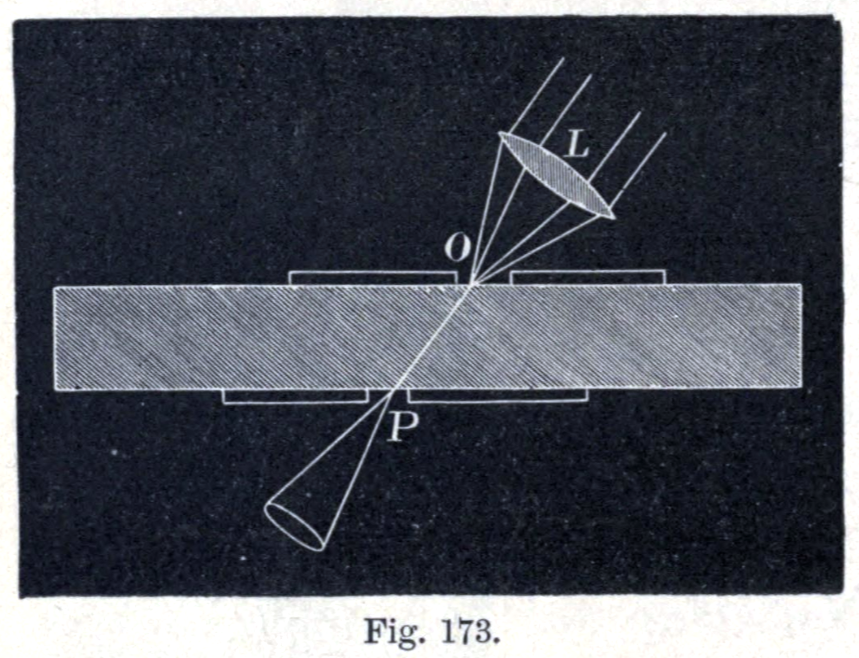
External conical refraction

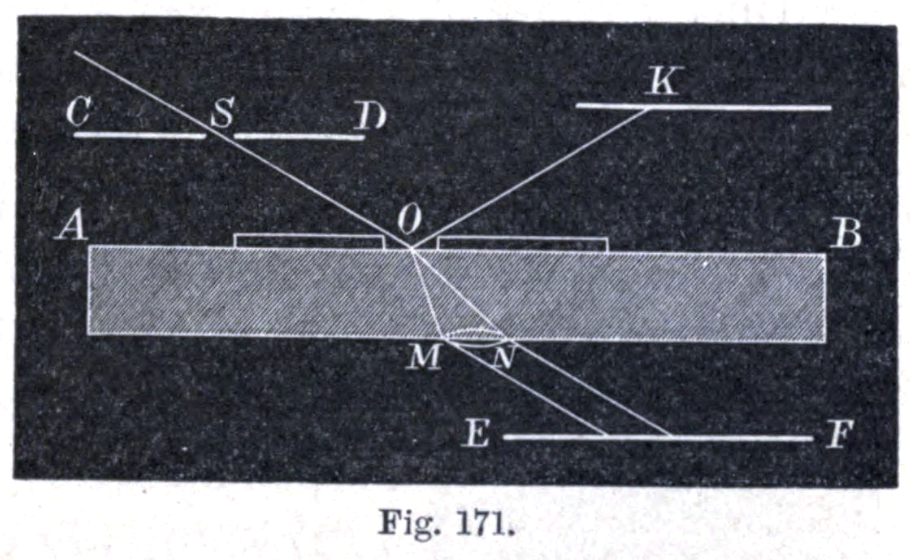
Internal conical refraction

== Geometric theory ==
A note on terminology: The surface of wavevectors is also called the wave surface, the surface of normal slowness, the surface of wave slowness, etc. The index ellipsoid was called the surface of elasticity, as according to Fresnel, light waves are transverse waves in, in exact analogy with transverse elastic waves in a material.

=== Surface of wavevectors ===
For notational cleanness, define $a = n_x^{-2} - n_y^{-2}, b = n_y^{-2} - n_z^{-2}$. This surface is also known as Fresnel wave surface.

Given a biaxial crystal with the three principal refractive indices $n_x < n_y < n_z$. For each possible direction $\hat k$ of planar waves propagating in the crystal, it has a certain group velocity $v_g(\hat k)$. The refractive index along that direction is defined as $n(\hat k) = c / v_g(\hat k)$.

Define, now, the surface of wavevectors as the following set of points
$$\{n(\hat k) \hat k : \hat k \in \text{sphere of radius 1}\}$$
In general, there are two group velocities along each wavevector direction. To find them, draw the plane perpendicular to $\hat k$. The indices are the major and minor axes of the ellipse of intersection between the plane and the index ellipsoid. At precisely 4 directions, the intersection is a circle (those are the axes where double refraction disappears, as discovered by Brewster, thus earning them the name of "biaxial"), and the two sheets of the surface of wavevectors collide at a conoidal point.

To be more precise, the surface of wavevectors satisfy the following degree-4 equation (, page 346):
$$(k_x^2 + k_y^2 + k_z^2) (n_x^2k_x^2 + n_y^2k_y^2 + n_z^2k_z^2)
- (n_y^2 + n_z^2) n_x^2 k_x^2 - (n_z^2 + n_x^2) n_y^2 k_y^2- (n_x^2 + n_y^2) n_z^2 k_z^2
+ (n_xn_yn_z)^2 = 0$$
or equivalently,
$$\sum_i \frac{n_i^2 k_i^2}{
\|k\|^2
-n_i^2} = 0$$

[Proof]

The major and minor axes are the solutions to the constraint optimization problem:
$$\begin{cases}
k^T r &= 0 \quad & k\perp r \\
r^T M r &= 1 \quad &r\text{ is on the index ellipsoid} \\
\mathrm{exr}(r^T r) & \quad &\|r\| \text{is max/minimized}
\end{cases}$$
where $M$ is the matrix with diagonal entries $n_x^{-2}, n_y^{-2}, n_z^{-2}$.

Since there are 3 variables and 2 constraints, we can use the Karush–Kuhn–Tucker conditions. That is, the three gradients $k, Mr, r$ are linearly dependent.

Let $Mr = \alpha k + \beta r$, then we have
$$0 = \alpha k^T r = r^T M r - \beta r^T r  \implies  \beta = (r^T r)^{-1}$$
Plugging $r_x = \frac{\alpha k_x}{n_x^{-2} - \beta}, \dots$ back to $k^T r = 0$, we obtain
$$\sum_i \frac{k_i^2}{n_i^{-2} - \|r\|^{-2}} = 0$$
Let $\vec k$ be the vector with the direction of $(k_x, k_y, k_z)$, and the length of $\|r\|$. We thus find that the equation of $\vec k$ is
$$\sum_i \frac{k_i^2}{n_i^{-2} - \|\vec k\|^{-2}} = 0$$
Multiply out the denominators, then multiply by $n_x^2n_y^2n_z^2$, we obtain the result.

In general, along a fixed direction $\hat k$, there are two possible wavevectors: The slow wave $n_+ \hat k$ and the fast wave $n_- \hat k$, where $n_+$ is the major semiaxis, and $n_-$ is the minor.

Plugging $\vec k = n\hat k$ into the equation of $\vec k$, we obtain a quadratic equation in $n^2$:
$$\left(\frac{k_x^2}{n_y^2n_z^2} + \cdots \right) n^4 - \left(\frac{k_x^2}{n_y^2} +\frac{k_x^2}{n_z^2}  + \cdots \right) n^2 + 1 =0$$
which has two solutions $n_-^2, n_+^2$. At exactly four directions, the two wavevectors coincide, because the plane perpendicular to $\hat k$ intersects the index ellipsoid at a circle. These directions are $\hat k = (\pm \cos \theta, 0, \pm \sin \theta)$ where $\sin^2 \theta = \frac{b}{a+b}$, at which point $n_- = n_+ = n_y$.

Expanding the equation of the surface in a neighborhood of $\vec k = ( n_y \cos \theta, 0, n_y \sin \theta)$, we obtain the local geometry of the surface, which is a cone subtended by a circle.

Further, there exists 4 planes, each of which is tangent to the surface at an entire circle (a trope conic, as defined later). These planes have equation (, pages 349–350)
$$k_x \sqrt{n_y^2 - n_x^2} \pm k_z \sqrt{n_z^2 - n_y^2} = \pm n_y \sqrt{n_z^2 - n_x^2}$$
or equivalently, $n_x k_x \sqrt{a} \pm n_zk_z\sqrt{b} = \pm n_xn_z \sqrt{a+b}$. and the 4 circles are the intersection of those planes with the ellipsoid
$$(n_x^2 + n_y^2)k_x^2 + 2n_y^2k_y^2 + (n_z^2 + n_y^2)k_z^2 - (n_x^2 + n_z^2)n_y^2 = 0$$
All 4 circles have radius $n_y^{-1}\sqrt{(n_y^2 - n_x^2) (n_z^2 - n_y^2)} = n_xn_z \sqrt{ab}$.

[Proof]
By differentiating its equation, we find that the points on the surface of wavevectors, where the tangent plane is parallel to the $k_y$ -axis, satisfies
$$k_y ((n_x^2 + n_y^2)k_x^2 + 2n_y^2k_y^2 + (n_z^2 + n_y^2)k_z^2 - (n_x^2 + n_z^2)n_y^2) = 0$$
That is, it is the union of the $k_xk_z$ -plane, and an ellipsoid.

Thus, such points on the surface of wavevectors has two parts: Every point with $k_y = 0$, and every point that intersects with the auxiliary ellipsoid
$$(n_x^2 + n_y^2)k_x^2 + 2n_y^2k_y^2 + (n_z^2 + n_y^2)k_z^2 - (n_x^2 + n_z^2)n_y^2 = 0$$

Using the equation of the auxiliary ellipsoid to eliminate $k_y^2$ from the equation of the wavevector surface, we obtain another degree-4 equation, which splits into the product of 4 planes:
$$k_z \pm k_x \sqrt{\frac{n_y^2 -n_x^2}{n_z^2 - n_y^2}} \pm n_y  \sqrt{\frac{n_z^2 -n_x^2}{n_z^2 - n_y^2}}$$

Thus, we obtain 4 ellipses: the 4 planar intersections with the auxiliary ellipsoid. These ellipses all exist on the wavevector surface, and the wavevector surface has a tangent plane parallel to the $k_y$ axis at those points. By direct computation, these ellipses are circles.

It remains to verify that the tangent plane is also parallel to the plane of the circle.

Let $P_0$ be one of those 4 planes, and let $\vec k$ be one point on the circle in $P_0$. If $k_y \neq 0$, then since the circle is on the surface, the tangent plane $P$ to the surface at $\vec k$ must contain the tangent line $l$ to the circle at $\vec k$. Also, the plane $P$ must also contain $l_y$, the line pass $\vec k$ that is parallel to the $k_y$ -axis. Therefore, the plane $P$ is spanned by $l_y$ and $l$, which is precisely the plane $P_0$. This then extends by continuity to the case of $k_y = 0$.

One can imagine the surface as a prune, with 4 little pits or dimples. Placing the prune on a flat desk, the prune would touch the desk at a point on a circle that covers a dimple.

In summary, the surface of wavevectors has singular points at $\hat k = (\pm \cos \theta, 0, \pm \sin \theta)$ where $\theta = \arctan \sqrt{b/a}$. The special tangent plane to the surface touches it at two points that make an angle of $\arctan \frac{n_x}{n_z}\sqrt{b/a}$ and $\arctan \frac{n_z}{n_x}\sqrt{b/a}$, respectively.

The angle of the wave cone, that is, the angle of the cone of internal conical refraction, is $A_{internal} = \arctan n_y^2 \sqrt{ab}$. Note that the cone is an oblique cone. Its apex is perpendicular to its base at a point on the circle (instead of the center of the circle).

=== Surface of ray vectors ===
The surface of ray vectors is the polar dual surface of the surface of wavevectors. Its equation is obtained by replacing $n_i$ with $n_i^{-1}$ in the equation for the surface of wavevectors. That is,
$$(r_x^2 + r_y^2 + r_z^2) (n_x^{-2}r_x^2 + n_y^{-2}r_y^2 + n_z^{-2}r_z^2)
- (n_y^{-2} + n_z^{-2}) n_x^{-2} r_x^2 - (n_z^{-2} + n_x^{-2}) n_y^{-2} r_y^2- (n_x^{-2} + n_y^{-2}) n_z^{-2} r_z^2
+ (n_xn_yn_z)^2 = 0$$
All the results above apply with the same modification. The two surfaces are related by their duality:

- The four special planes tangent to the surface of wavevectors on a circle correspond to the 4 conoidal points on the surface of ray vectors.
- The four conoidal points on the surface of wavevectors correspond to the 4 planes tangent to the surface of ray vectors on a circle.

=== Approximately circular ===
In typical crystals, the difference between $n_x, n_y, n_z$ is small. In this case, the conoidal point is approximately at the center of the tangent circle surrounding it. Thus, the cone of light (in both the internal and the external refraction cases) is approximately circular.

=== Polarization ===
Take the unit sphere. Each point on it is a possible direction of the wavevector. For each, plot the direction of the major and minor axes of the ellipse intersection. This results in two families of curves intersecting orthogonally on the unit sphere, with 4 singularities. The graph is topologically the same as that of the umbilical point of a generic ellipsoid.

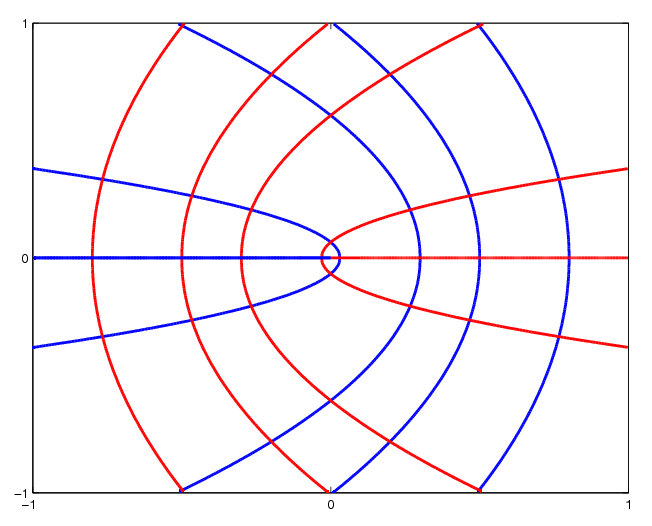
The index of the vector field is 1/2, which explains why the direction of polarization turns by half of $\phi$.

In the case of external conical refraction, we have one ray splitting into a cone of planar waves, each corresponding to a point on the tangent circle of the wavevector surface. There is one tangent circle for each of the four quadrants. Take the one with $k_x, k_z > 0$, then take a point on it. Let the point be $\vec k$.

To find the polarization direction of the planar wave in direction $\vec k$, take the intersection of the index ellipsoid and the plane perpendicular to $\vec k$. The polarization direction is the direction of the major axis of the ellipse intersection between the plane perpendicular to $\vec k$ and the index ellipsoid.

Thus, the $\vec k$ with the highest $k_z$ corresponds to a light polarized parallel to the $k_y$ direction, and the $\vec k$ with the lowest $k_z$ corresponds to a light polarized in a direction perpendicular to it. In general, rotating along the circle of light by an angle of $\phi$ would rotate the polarization direction by approximately $\phi/2$.

This means that turning around the cone an entire round would turn the polarization angle by only half a round. This is an early example of the geometric phase. This geometric phase of $\pi$ is observable in the difference of the angular momentum of the beam, before and after conical refraction.

=== Algebraic geometry ===
The surface of wavevectors is defined by a degree-4 algebraic equation, and thus was studied for its own sake in classical algebraic geometry.

Arthur Cayley studied the surface in 1849. He described it as a degenerate case of tetrahedroid quartic surfaces. These surfaces are defined as those that are intersected by four planes, forming a tetrahedron. Each plane intersects the surface at two conics. For the wavevector surface, the tetrahedron degenerates into a flat square. The three vertices of the tetrahedron are conjugate to the two conics within the face they define. The two conics intersect at 4 points, giving 16 singular points.

In general, the surface of wavevectors is a Kummer surface, and all properties of it apply. For example:

- It is projectively isomorphic to its dual surface.
- There are at most 16 singular points.
- Each trope of the surface corresponds to a singular point on its dual. Here, a trope is defined as a double-conic on the surface. In other words, it is where the intersection of the surface with a plane factors into a perfect square.
- For each Kummer surface, there exists a two-dimensional family of lines, such that each point of the surface is tangent to two lines in the family.

More properties of the surface of wavevectors are in Chapter 10 of the classical reference on Kummer surfaces.

Every linear material has a quartic dispersion equation, so its wavevector surface is a Kummer surface, which can have at most 16 singular points. That such a material might exist was proposed in 1910, and in 2016, scientists made such a (meta)material, and confirmed it has 16 directions for conical refraction.

== Diffraction theory ==
The classical theory of conical refraction was essentially in the style of geometric optics, and ignores the wave nature of light. Wave theory is needed to explain certain observable phenomena, such as Poggendorff rings, secondary rings, the central spot, and its associated rings. In this context, conical refraction is usually named "conical diffraction" to emphasize the wave nature of light.

== Observations ==
The angle of the cone depends on the properties of the crystal, specifically the differences between its principal refractive indices. The effect is typically small, requiring careful experimental setup to observe. Early experiments used sunlight and pinholes to create narrow beams of light, while modern experiments often employ lasers and high-resolution detectors.

Poggendorff observed two rings separated by a thin dark band. This was explained by Voigt. See Born and Wolf, section 15.3, for a derivation.

Potter observed in 1841 certain diffraction phenomena that were inexplicable with Hamilton's theory. Specifically, if we follow the two rings created by the internal conic refraction, then the inner ring would contract until it becomes a single point, while the outer ring expands indefinitely. A satisfactory explanation required later developments in diffraction theory.

Conical refraction has also been observed in transverse sound waves in quartz.

== Modern developments ==
The study of conical refraction has continued since its discovery, with researchers exploring its various aspects and implications. Some recent work includes:

- Paraxial theory: This theory provides a simplified description of conical diffraction for small angles of incidence and has been used to analyze the detailed structure of the light patterns observed.
- Chiral crystals: The inclusion of optical activity (chirality) in the crystal leads to new phenomena, such as the transformation of the conical cylinder into a "spun cusp" caustic.
- Absorption and dichroism: The presence of absorption in the crystal significantly alters the behavior of light, leading to the splitting of diabolical points into pairs of branch points and affecting the emergent light patterns.
- Nonlinear optics: Nonlinear optical effects in biaxial crystals can interact with conical refraction, leading to complex and intriguing phenomena.
- Applications: Conical refraction had found applications in optical trapping, free-space optical communications, polarization metrology, super-resolution imaging, two-photon polymerization, and lasers.

== See also ==
- Birefringence
- Wave surface
- Crystal optics
- Polarization
- Caustics
- Keller cone
