= Ernst Kummer =

German mathematician (1810–1893)

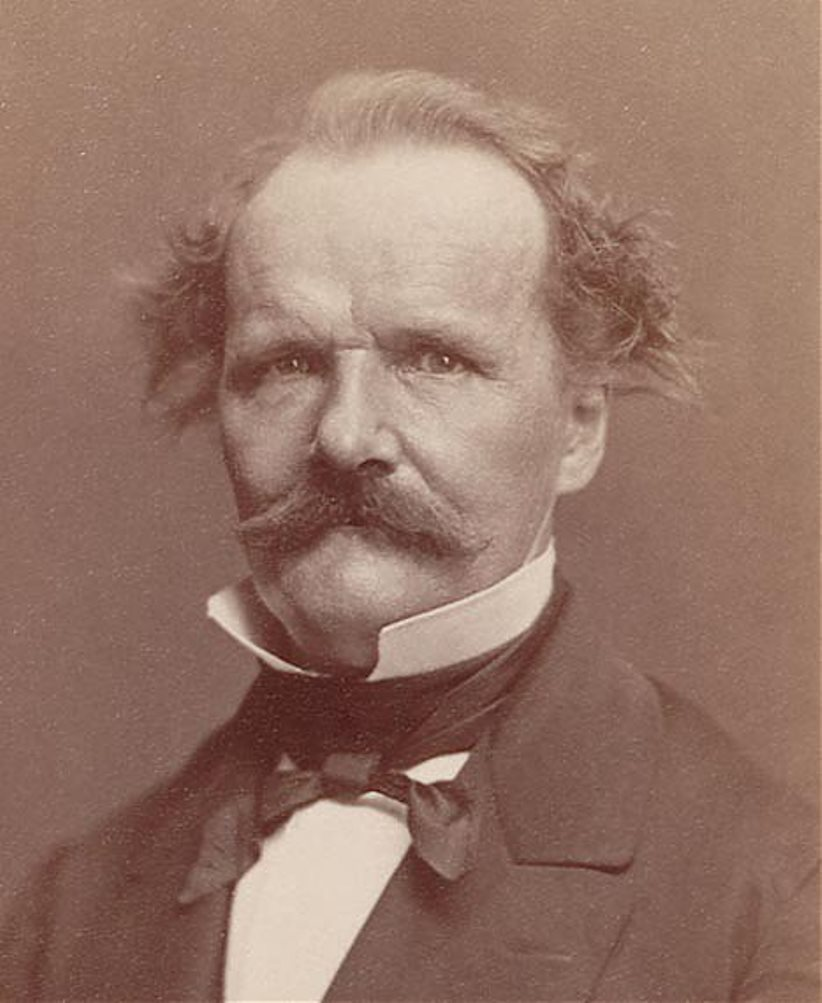
- Born: Ernst Eduard Kummer; 29 January 1810; Sorau, Prussia
- Died: 14 May 1893 (aged 83); Berlin, Brandenburg, Germany
- Education: University of Halle (Ph.D., 1831)
- Known for: Bessel functions, Kummer theory, Kummer surface, and other contributions
- Scientific career
- Fields: Mathematics
- Workplaces: University of Berlin; University of Breslau; Gewerbeinstitut; Lomonosov University
- Thesis: De cosinuum et sinuum potestatibus secundum cosinus et sinus arcuum multiplicium evolvendis (1831/1832)
- Doctoral advisor: Heinrich Scherk
- Doctoral students: Paul Du Bois-Reymond; Georg Frobenius; Lazarus Fuchs; Wilhelm Killing; Adolf Kneser; Franz Mertens; Hermann Schwarz; Georg Cantor; Hans Carl Friedrich von Mangoldt; Adolf Piltz; Friedrich Prym
- Other notable students: Nikolai Bugaev; Gotthold Eisenstein

Ernst Eduard Kummer (German: [ˈkʊmɐ]; 29 January 1810 – 14 May 1893) was a German mathematician. Skilled in applied mathematics, Kummer trained German army officers in ballistics; afterwards, he taught for 10 years in a gymnasium, the German equivalent of high school, where he inspired the mathematical career of Leopold Kronecker.

== Life ==
Kummer was born in Sorau, Brandenburg (then part of Prussia). His father, a physician, died in 1813.

He initially pursued Protestant theology but later studied mathematics and was awarded a PhD from the University of Halle in 1831 for writing a prize-winning mathematical essay (De cosinuum et sinuum potestatibus secundum cosinus et sinus arcuum multiplicium evolvendis), which was published a year later.

In 1840, Kummer married Ottilie Mendelssohn, daughter of Nathan Mendelssohn and Henriette Itzig. Ottilie was a cousin of Felix Mendelssohn and his sister Rebecca Mendelssohn Bartholdy, the wife of the mathematician Peter Gustav Lejeune Dirichlet. His second wife (whom he married soon after the death of Ottilie in 1848), Bertha Cauer, was a maternal cousin of Ottilie. Overall, he had 13 children. His daughter Marie married the mathematician Hermann Schwarz. Kummer retired from teaching and from mathematics in 1890 and died three years later in Berlin.

== Mathematics ==
Kummer made several contributions to mathematics in different areas; he codified some of the relations between different hypergeometric series, known as contiguity relations. The Kummer surface results from taking the quotient of a two-dimensional abelian variety by the cyclic group {1, −1} (an early orbifold: it has 16 singular points, and its geometry was intensively studied in the nineteenth century).

Kummer also proved Fermat's Last Theorem for a considerable class of prime exponents (see regular prime, ideal class group). His methods were closer, perhaps, to p-adic ones than to ideal theory as understood later, though the term 'ideal' was invented by Kummer. He studied what were later called Kummer extensions of fields: that is, extensions generated by adjoining an nth root to a field already containing a primitive nth root of unity. This is a significant extension of the theory of quadratic extensions, and the genus theory of quadratic forms (linked to the 2-torsion of the class group). As such, it is still foundational for class field theory.

Kummer further conducted research in ballistics and, jointly with William Rowan Hamilton he investigated ray systems.

== Publications ==
- Kummer, Ernst Eduard (1975), Weil, André (ed.), Collected papers. Volume 1: Contributions to Number Theory, Berlin, New York: Springer-Verlag, ISBN 978-0-387-06835-0, MR 0465760
- Kummer, Ernst Eduard (1975), Weil, André (ed.), Collected papers. Volume II: Function theory, geometry and miscellaneous, Berlin, New York: Springer-Verlag, ISBN 978-3-540-06836-5, MR 0465761

== See also ==
- 25628 Kummer – asteroid named after Ernst Kummer
- Kummer configuration
- Kummer's congruence
- Kummer series
- Kummer theory
- Kummer's theorem, on prime-power divisors of binomial coefficients
- Kummer's function
- Kummer sum
- Kummer variety
- Kummer–Vandiver conjecture
- Kummer's transformation of series
- Ideal number
- Regular prime
- Reflection theorem
- Principalization
