= Kummer configuration =

In geometry, the Kummer configuration, named for Ernst Kummer, is a geometric configuration of 16 points and 16 planes such that each point lies on 6 of the planes and each plane contains 6 of the points. Further, every pair of points is incident with exactly two planes, and every two planes intersect in exactly two points. The configuration is therefore a biplane, specifically, a 2−(16,6,2) design. The 16 nodes and 16 tropes of a Kummer surface form a Kummer configuration.

There are three different non-isomorphic ways to select 16 different 6-sets from 16 elements satisfying the above properties, that is, forming a biplane. The most symmetric of the three is the Kummer configuration, also called "the best biplane" on 16 points.

== Construction ==

Following the method of Jordan (1869), but see also Assmus and Sardi (1981), arrange the 16 points (say the numbers 1 to 16) in a 4x4 grid. For each element in turn, take the 3 other points in the same row and the 3 other points in the same column, and combine them into a 6-set. This creates one 6-element block for each point.

Consider two points on the same row or column. There are two other points in that row or column which show up in the blocks for both starting points, therefore those blocks intersect in two points. Now consider two points not in the same row or column. Their corresponding blocks intersect in two points which form a rectangle with the two starting points. Thus all blocks intersect in two points. By examining the blocks corresponding to those intersection points, one sees that any two starting points are present in two blocks.

== Automorphisms ==
There are exactly 11520 permutations of the 16 points that give the same blocks back. Additionally, exchanging the block labels with the point labels yields another automorphism of size 2, resulting in 23040 automorphisms.

== See also ==
- Klein configuration
