= Surface =

Outermost layer of a physical object

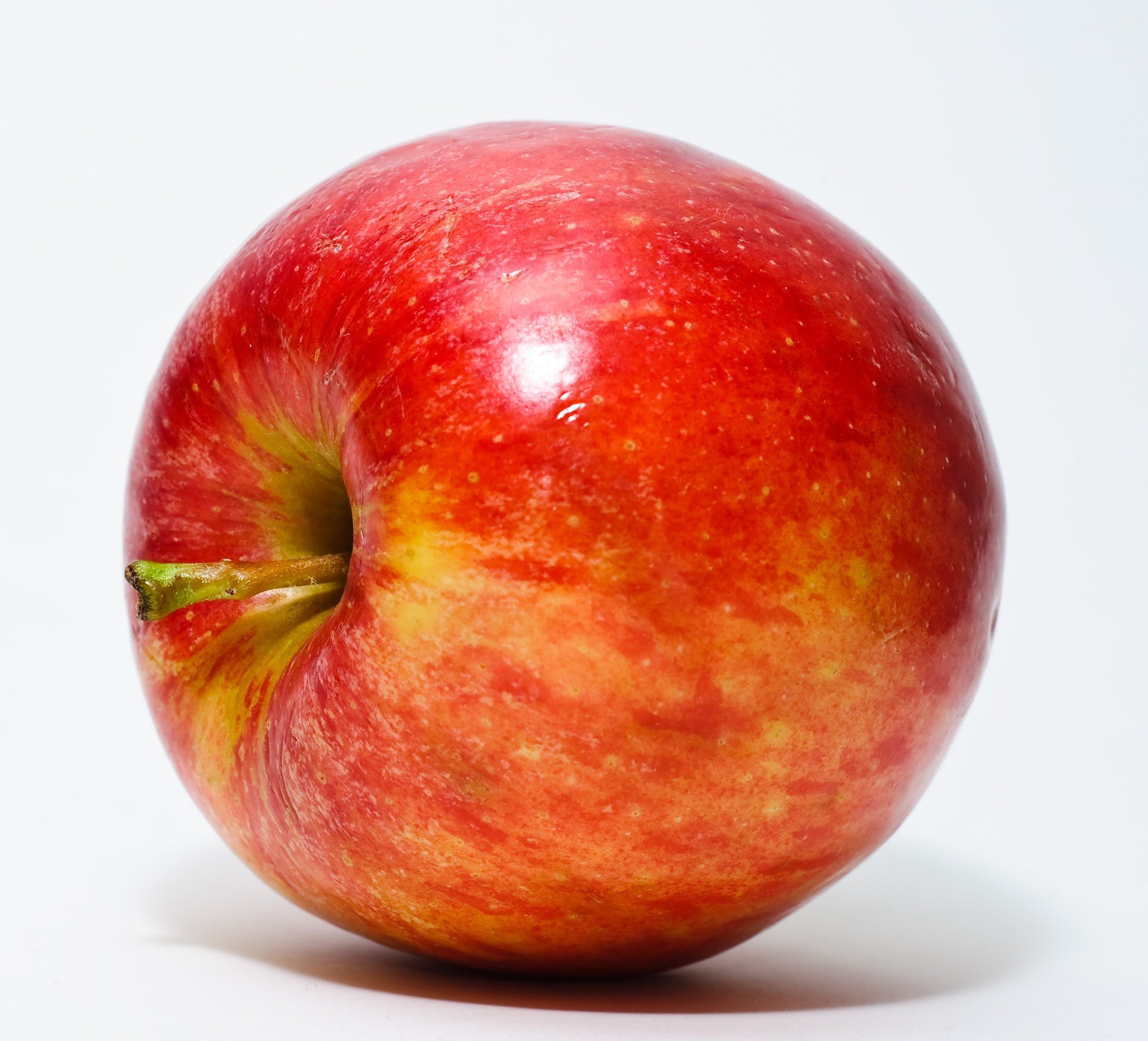
The surface of an apple has various perceptible characteristics, such as curvature, smoothness, texture, color, and shininess; observing these characteristics by sight or touch allows the object to be identified.

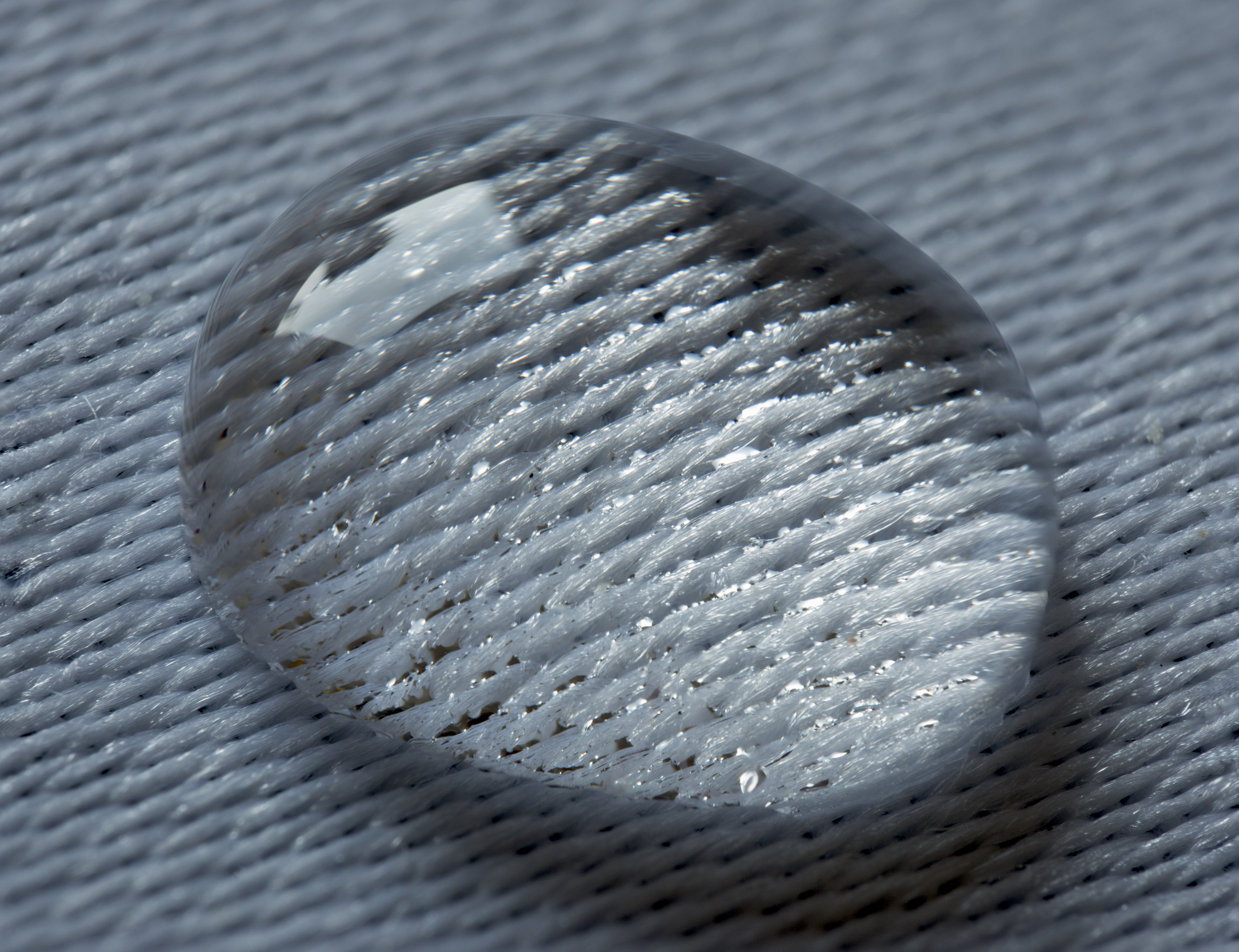
Water droplet lying on a damask. Surface tension is high enough to prevent it passing through the textile.

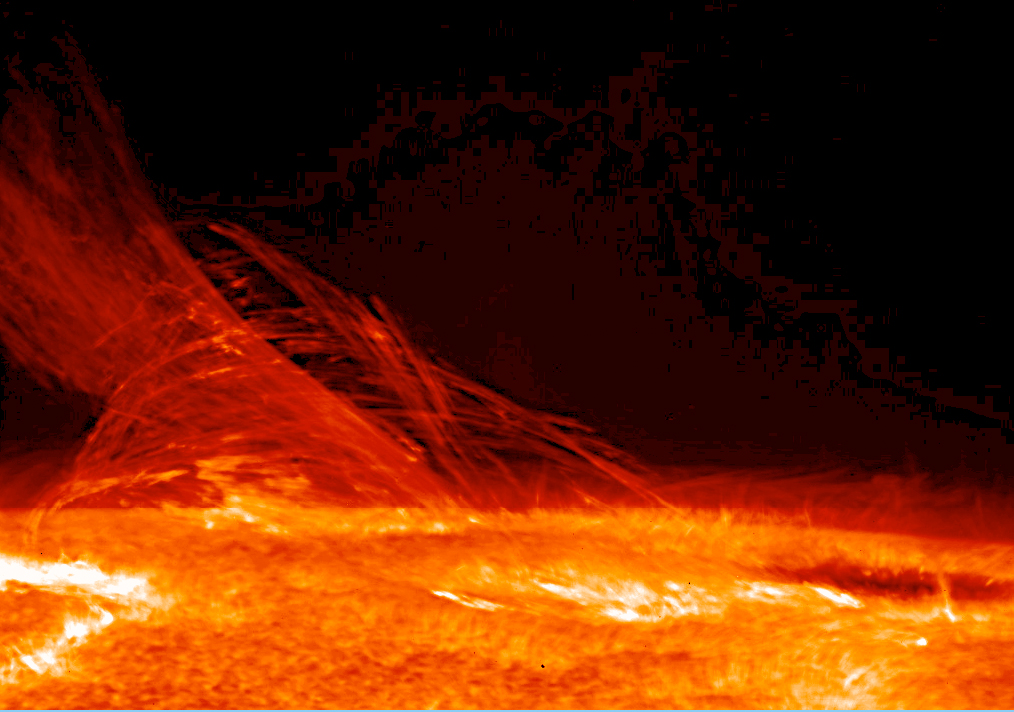
The Sun, like all stars, appears from a distance to have a distinct surface, but on closer approach has no set surface.

A surface, as the term is most generally used, is the outermost or uppermost layer of a physical object. It is the portion or region of the object that can first be observed and with which other objects first interact.

The concept of surface has been abstracted and formalized in mathematics, specifically in geometry. Depending on the properties on which the emphasis is given, there are several inequivalent such formalizations that are all called surface, sometimes with a qualifier such as algebraic surface, smooth surface or fractal surface.

The concept of a surface and its abstraction in mathematics are both widely used in physics, engineering, computer graphics, and many other disciplines, primarily in representing the surfaces of physical objects. For example, in analyzing the aerodynamic properties of an airplane, the central consideration is the flow of air along its surface. The concept also raises certain philosophical questions—for example, how thick is the layer of atoms or molecules that can be considered part of the surface of an object (i.e., where does the "surface" end and the "interior" begin), and do objects really have a surface at subatomic scale.

== Perception of surfaces ==
The surface of an object is the part of the object that is typically first perceived, primarily using the senses of sight and touch. Humans equate seeing the surface of an object with seeing an object. For example, in looking at an automobile, it is normally not possible to see the engine, electronics, and other internal structures, but the object is still recognized as an automobile because the surface identifies it as one. Conceptually, the "surface" of an object can be defined as the topmost layer of atoms. Many objects and organisms have a surface that is in some way distinct from their interior. For example, the peel of an apple has very different qualities from the interior of the apple, and the exterior surface of a radio may have very different components from the interior. Peeling the apple constitutes removal of the surface, ultimately leaving a different surface with a different texture and appearance, identifiable as a peeled apple. Removing the exterior surface of an electronic device may render its purpose unrecognizable. By contrast, removing the outermost layer of a rock or the topmost layer of liquid contained in a glass would leave a new surface of that substance or material with the same composition, only slightly reduced in volume.

== In mathematics ==
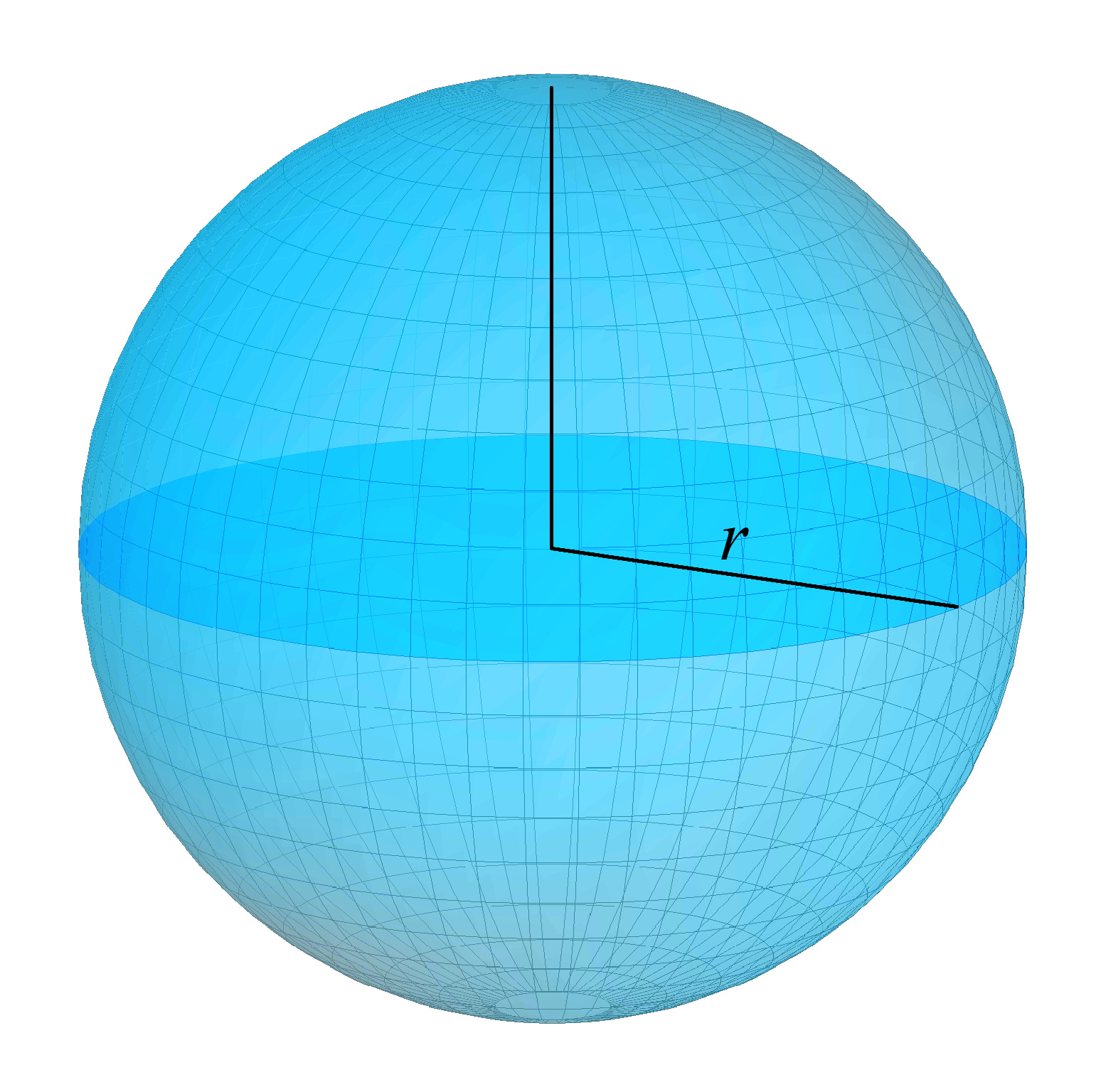
A sphere is the surface of a solid ball, here having radius r

In mathematics, a surface is a mathematical model of the common concept of a surface. It is a generalization of a plane, but, unlike a plane, it may be curved (this is analogous to a curve generalizing a straight line). An example of a non-flat surface is the sphere.

There are several more precise definitions, depending on the context and the mathematical tools that are used for the study. The simplest mathematical surfaces are planes and spheres in the Euclidean 3-space. Typically, in algebraic geometry, a surface may cross itself (and may have other singularities), while, in topology and differential geometry, it may not.

A surface is a topological space of dimension two; this means that a moving point on a surface may move in two directions (it has two degrees of freedom). In other words, around almost every point, there is a coordinate patch on which a two-dimensional coordinate system is defined. For example, the surface of the Earth resembles (ideally) a sphere, and latitude and longitude provide two-dimensional coordinates on it (except at the poles and along the 180th meridian).

== In the physical sciences ==
The concept of a surface in the physical sciences encompasses the structures and dynamics of and occurring at surfaces. The field underlies many practical disciplines such as semiconductor physics and applied nanotechnology but is also of fundamental interest.

Synchrotron x-ray and neutron scattering measurements are used to provide experimental data on the structure and motion of molecular adsorbates adsorbed on surfaces. The aim of such methods is to provide the data needed to benchmark the latest developments in the modelling of surface systems, their electronic and physical structures and the energetics and friction associated with surface motion.

Current projects focus on the surface adsorption of polyaromatic hydrocarbons (PAHs), a class of molecules key to the refinement of the modelling of dispersive forces through approaches such as density functional theory, and build on our complementary work applying helium atom scattering and scanning tunnelling microscopy to small molecules with aromatic functionality.

Many surfaces considered in physics and chemistry (physical sciences in general) are interfaces. For example, a surface may be the idealized limit between two fluids, liquid and gas (the surface of the sea in air) or the idealized boundary of a solid (the surface of a ball). In fluid dynamics, the shape of a free surface may be defined by surface tension. However, they are surfaces only at macroscopic scale. At microscopic scale, they may have some thickness. At atomic scale, they do not look at all as a surface, because of holes formed by spaces between atoms or molecules.

Other surfaces considered in physics are wavefronts. One of these, discovered by Fresnel, is called wave surface by mathematicians.

The surface of the reflector of a telescope is a paraboloid of revolution.

Other occurrences:

- Soap bubbles, which are physical examples of minimal surfaces
- Equipotential surface in, e.g., gravity fields
- Earth's surface
- Surface science, the study of physical and chemical phenomena that occur at the interface of two phases
- Surface metrology
- Surface wave, a mechanical wave
- Atmospheric boundaries (tropopause, edge of space, plasmapause, etc.)

== In computer graphics ==
In computer graphics, a surface is a mathematical representation of a 3D object or shape. Surfaces are used to model and render the outer layer of an object, giving it form, texture, and color in a virtual space. A surface is essentially a collection of points in 3D space that are mathematically defined and visualized to form the shape of an object. Surfaces are crucial for creating realistic 3D models, as they define the "skin" or "outer boundary" of an object.

Surfaces can be categorized based on how they are defined or represented:

- Polygonal surfaces are made up of polygons, which are typically triangles or quadrilaterals. They are approximate and sometimes visibly faceted. They are common in games and other real-time rendering because they are computationally efficient.
- Parametric surfaces are defined using equations that depend on parameters. They include Bézier surfaces and NURBS. They are smooth and exact. They are used in CAD and animation.
- Implicit surfaces are the solution sets of equations of the form $f(x, y, z) = 0$. They capture some complex shapes well.

Surfaces in computer graphics have several important attributes that define their behavior and appearance. Geometry is a key attribute that determines the shape, size, and position of the surface in 3D space, forming the foundational structure of the model. Material properties, such as texture, color, shininess, and transparency, influence how the surface interacts with light and contribute to its visual appeal. Additionally, normals, which are perpendicular vectors to the surface at each point, are essential for accurate lighting and shading calculations, ensuring that the surface responds realistically to light sources. Surfaces in computer graphics have a wide range of applications. They are extensively used in modeling objects, such as designing characters, cars, and buildings, where the surface defines the shape and structure of the model. In rendering, surfaces play a critical role in determining how objects appear in a scene by influencing their shading, reflections, and textures, which contribute to the overall realism. Additionally, surfaces are vital in simulations, where they help replicate physical properties such as the movement of water waves or the dynamics of fabrics, enhancing the accuracy of visual and interactive experiences.

One of the main challenges in computer graphics is creating realistic simulations of surfaces. In technical applications of 3D computer graphics (CAx) such as computer-aided design and computer-aided manufacturing, surfaces are one way of representing objects. The other ways are wireframe (lines and curves) and solids. Point clouds are also sometimes used as temporary ways to represent an object, with the goal of using the points to create one or more of the three permanent representations.

One technique used for enhancing surface realism in computer graphics is the use of physically-based rendering (PBR) algorithms which simulate the interaction of light with surfaces based on their physical properties, such as reflectance, roughness, and transparency. By incorporating mathematical models and algorithms, PBR can generate highly realistic renderings that resemble the behavior of real-world materials. PBR has found practical applications beyond entertainment, extending its impact to architectural design, product prototyping, and scientific simulations.
