= Hamilton Walk =

Event commemorating the Irish mathematician Hamilton's discovery of quaternions

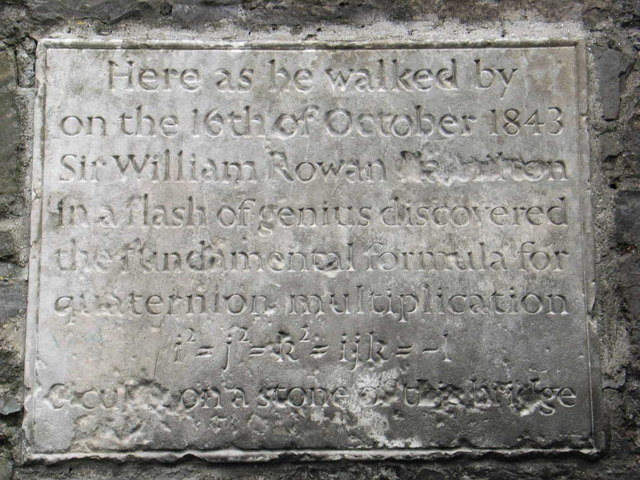
Quaternion plaque on Brougham (Broom) Bridge, Dublin. Erected by the Dublin Institute for Advanced Studies (DIAS) in 1958.

The Hamilton Walk from Dunsink Observatory to Broom Bridge on the Royal Canal in Dublin takes place on 16 October each year. This is the anniversary of the day in 1843 when William Rowan Hamilton discovered the non-commutative algebraic system known as quaternions, while walking with his wife along the banks of the Royal Canal.

== History ==
The walk was launched in 1990 by Prof Tony O'Farrell of the Department of Mathematics at St Patrick's College, Maynooth. It starts at DIAS Dunsink Observatory, where Hamilton lived and was the Director from 1827 to 1865, and ends at the spot where he recorded his discovery by carving the following equation on Broom Bridge:

$$i^2=j^2=k^2=ijk=-1\,$$

These are the basic relations which define the quaternions. The original inscription by Hamilton is no longer there, but a plaque erected by the Dublin Institute for Advanced Studies (DIAS) and unveiled by the Taoiseach Éamon de Valera in 1958 marks the spot where he recorded his discovery.

Many prominent mathematicians have attended the event; they include Wolf Prize winner Roger Penrose (2013), Abel Prize and Copley Medal winner Andrew Wiles (2003), Fields Medallists Timothy Gowers (2004) and Efim Zelmanov (2009), and Nobel Prize winners Murray Gell-Mann (2002), Steven Weinberg (2005) and Frank Wilczek (2007).

At the end of the 1990s, O'Farrell's younger colleague Fiacre Ó Cairbre took over the organisation of the walk, but O'Farrell always gives a speech at Broom Bridge. O’Farrell and Ó Cairbre received the 2018 Maths Week Ireland Award for "outstanding work in raising public awareness of mathematics" resulting from the founding and nurturing of the Hamilton walk.

It has been argued that the discovery of the quaternions, by revealing deep mathematical structures that did not obey the commutative law, allowed mathematicians to create new systems unbound by the rules of ordinary arithmetic. It follows that the climax of the Hamilton walk at Broom Bridge marks the exact spot where modern algebra was born.

The Hamilton Way is a proposed foot and cycle path that follows the route of the Hamilton Walk, linking DIAS Dunsink Observatory to the Royal Canal.
