= Eliza Mary Hamilton =

Irish poet (1807–1851)

Eliza Mary Hamilton (1807–1851) was an Irish poet.

Her brother was the astronomer and mathematician William Rowan Hamilton, and she has been described as "probably one of the few nineteenth-century poets able to address the moon from the perspective of one who had actually studied its contours through a telescope and helped to chart its movement."

== Early life and education ==
Hamilton was born on 4 April 1807 in Dublin. Her father Archibald, a solicitor, died in 1819, and her mother Sarah, née Hutton, died in 1817. Eliza was the third of their five children, and spent much of her childhood living with relations of her mother in a Moravian settlement near Ballinderry in Northern Ireland. She returned to Dublin in 1822 and attended school there. From 1827 to 1833 Hamilton and her sisters lived at Dunsink Observatory with their brother William Rowan Hamilton, Irish Astronomer Royal and professor of astronomy at Dublin University. William encouraged Eliza to take up astronomy, which she resisted, although she became "virtually unique as a woman poet of the Romantic period with an acute understanding of astronomical principles" and "was probably one of the few nineteenth-century poets able to address the moon from the perspective of one who had actually studied its contours through a telescope and helped to chart its movement"

== Writing ==
Hamilton's brother William considered himself a "versifier" but recognised his sister's superior literary talent and encouraged her to contact his friend the English poet William Wordsworth. In 1830 William and Eliza met Wordsworth at his home, Rydal Mount, in Cumbria.

Hamilton published poems in the Dublin Literary Gazette, a short-lived publication (with the alternative title of "Weekly Chrnoicle of Criticism, Belles Lettres and Fine Arts") which appeared weekly from January to June 1830 and was superseded by the slightly longer-lived National Magazine, which appeared monthly from July to December 1830 and for four issues in 1831. Her "On Reading over Again Letters of the Dead" appeared in the second issue, in January 1830. She subsequently published in the Dublin University Magazine as "E.M.H.".

Her one book, entitled Poems, was published in Dublin in 1838 by Hodges and Smith, under her full name. It was reviewed, over seven pages, by William Archer Butler in Dublin University Magazine, who concluded:

We sincerely hope that this volume may have the success which we know it deserves; and that Miss Hamilton, who seems to draw from a fountain as full as it is clear and pure, may follow it up by the more sustained exertion of those powers of which the present one leaves no doubt.

She had planned to produce a second book in the 1840s, but suffered poor health from 1846 and was unable to do so.

Her poetry "combines philosophical, religious and scientific themes and insights with remarkable skill, although her later poems reveal an increasingly intense evangelicalism replete with apocalyptic visions of plague, sin and fallen angels".

== Death and legacy ==
Hamilton died at Dunsink on 14 May 1851 and was buried in St Mary's Church in Dublin with her sister Grace and their parents.

The National Library of Ireland holds some of her correspondence and poems.

== Selected publications ==
- Hamilton, Eliza Mary (1838). Poems. Dublin: Hodges & Smith. (available online via Google Books)
