= Keller cone =

Physical phenomena in optics

In optics, Keller cone or Rubinowicz–Keller cone is the locus of conically diffracted rays produced when an incident optical wave strikes a sharp edge of a scattering object. Named after American mathematician Joseph Keller, who reported the effect as an integral part of his geometrical theory of diffraction in 1962, it was first recognized by Adalbert Rubinowicz in 1924 for the special case of diffraction from an aperture on a thin screen.

Keller cones are widely referenced in works on radio propagation and radar cross section calculations. Besides electromagnetics, they are also present in acoustic wave diffraction. They were experimentally observed in 1972 using helium–neon lasers incident on a razor blade.

== See also ==
- Biot–Tolstoy–Medwin diffraction model
- Caustic (optics)
- Conical refraction
- Shooting and bouncing rays
- Uniform theory of diffraction
