= Broom Bridge =

Broom Bridge Droichead Broome
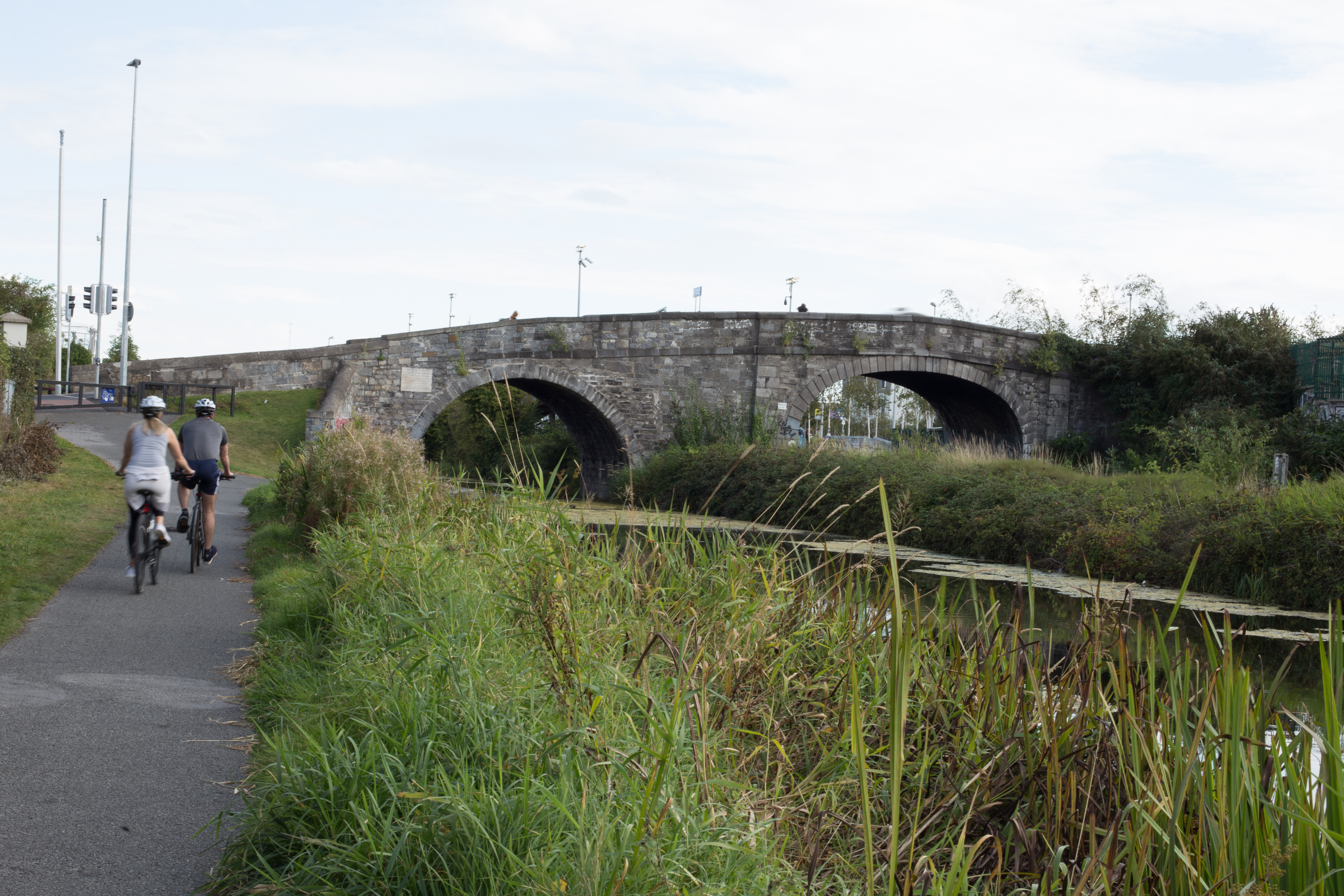
- Broom Bridge viewed from the west from the towpath
- Coordinates: 53.373°N 6.3°W
- Crosses: Royal Canal
- Locale: Dublin

Location
- Interactive map of Broom Bridge

Broom Bridge (Irish: Droichead Broome), also called Broome Bridge, and sometimes Brougham Bridge, is a bridge along Broombridge Road which crosses the Royal Canal in Cabra, Dublin, Ireland. Broome Bridge is named after William Broome, one of the directors of the Royal Canal company who lived nearby.

== Historical significance ==
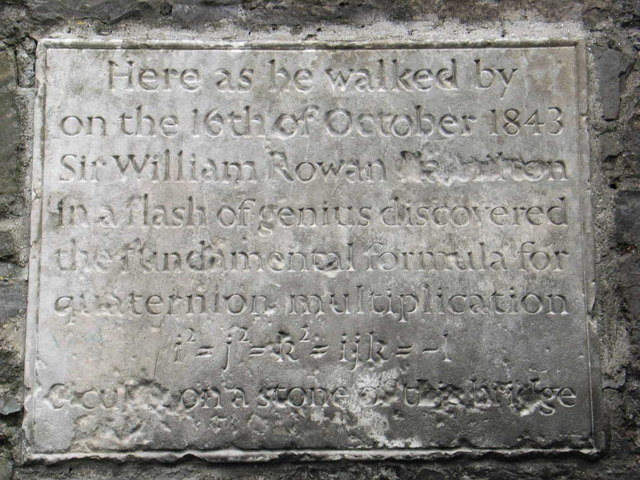
Plaque on Broome Bridge

The bridge is famous for being the location where Sir William Rowan Hamilton first wrote down the fundamental formula for quaternions on 16 October 1843, which is to this day commemorated by a stone plaque on the northwest corner of the underside of the bridge. After being spoiled by the action of vandals and some visitors, the plaque was moved to a different place, higher, under the railing of the bridge.

The text on the plaque reads:

Here as he walked by
on the 16th of October 1843
Sir William Rowan Hamilton
in a flash of genius discovered
the fundamental formula for
quaternion multiplication
$i^2 = j^2 = k^2 = ijk = -1$
& cut it on a stone of this bridge.

After his 1843 discovery of the quaternions, Hamilton's sons William Edwin Hamilton and Archibald Henry Hamilton referred to the bridge as the Quaternion Bridge.

Given the historical importance of the bridge with respect to mathematics, mathematicians from all over the world have been known to take part in the annual commemorative walk from Dunsink Observatory to the site. Attendees have included Nobel Prize winners Murray Gell-Mann, Steven Weinberg and Frank Wilczek, and mathematicians Sir Andrew Wiles, Sir Roger Penrose and Ingrid Daubechies. The 16 October is sometimes referred to as Broomsday (in reference to Broome Bridge) and as a nod to the literary commemorations on 16 June (Bloomsday in honour of James Joyce).

== In literature ==
- Broom Bridge, named as Brougham Bridge, along with Hamilton's eureka moment, are mentioned in the Thomas Pynchon novel Against the Day.
