= Kummer surface =

Irreducible nodal surface

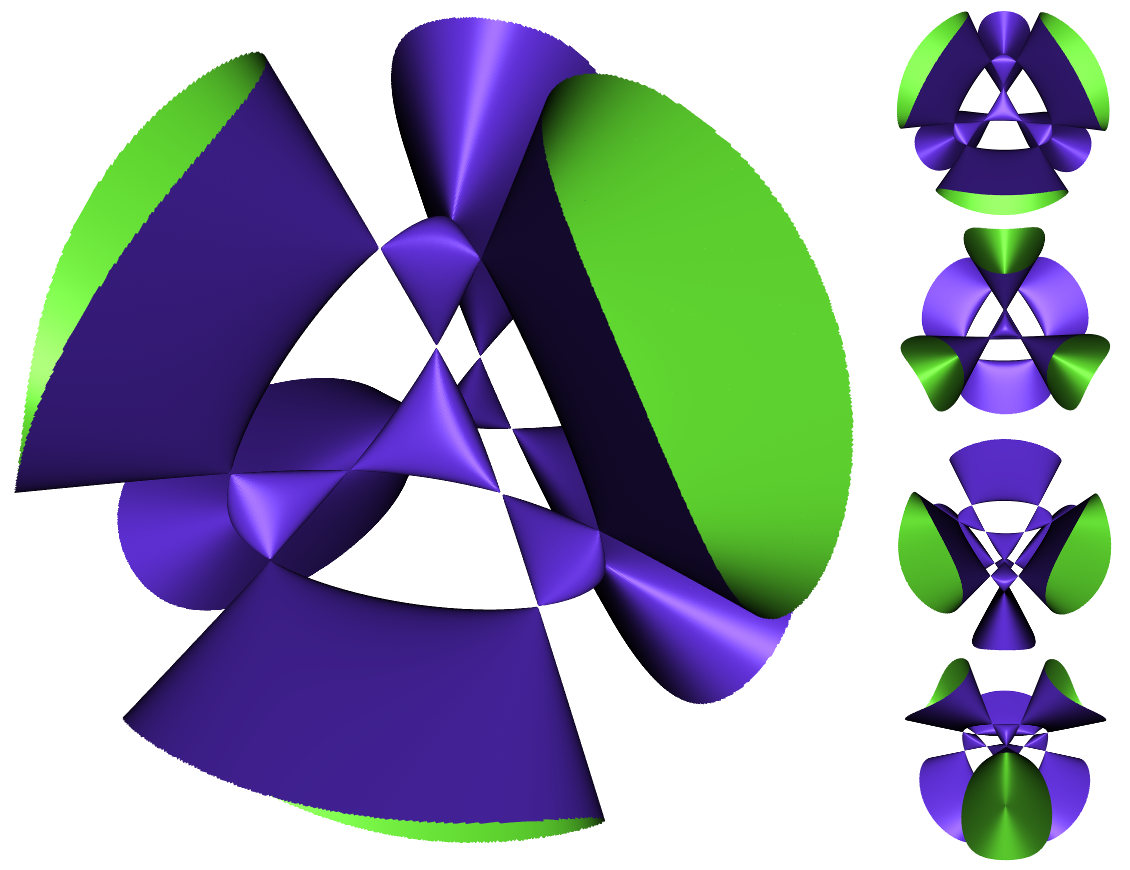
Plot of the real points

3D model of a Kummer surface

In algebraic geometry, a Kummer quartic surface, first studied by Ernst Kummer (1864), is an irreducible nodal surface of degree 4 in $\mathbb{P}^3$ with the maximal possible number of 16 double points. Any such surface is the Kummer variety of the Jacobian variety of a smooth hyperelliptic curve of genus 2; i.e. a quotient of the Jacobian by the Kummer involution x ↦ −x. The Kummer involution has 16 fixed points: the 16 2-torsion point of the Jacobian, and they are the 16 singular points of the quartic surface. Resolving the 16 double points of the quotient of a (possibly nonalgebraic) torus by the Kummer involution gives a K3 surface with 16 disjoint rational curves; these K3 surfaces are also sometimes called Kummer surfaces.

Other surfaces closely related to Kummer surfaces include Weddle surfaces, wave surfaces, and tetrahedroids.

== Geometry ==
=== Singular quartic surfaces and the double plane model ===
Let $K\subset\mathbb{P}^3$ be a quartic surface with an ordinary double point p, near which K looks like a quadratic cone. Any projective line through p then meets K with multiplicity two at p, and will therefore meet the quartic K in just two other points. Identifying the lines in $\mathbb{P}^3$ through the point p with $\mathbb{P}^2$, we get a double cover from the blow up of K at p to $\mathbb{P}^2$; this double cover is given by sending q ≠ p ↦ $\scriptstyle\overline{pq}$, and any line in the tangent cone of p in K to itself. The ramification locus of the double cover is a plane curve C of degree 6, and all the nodes of K which are not p map to nodes of C.

By the genus degree formula, the maximal possible number of nodes on a sextic curve is obtained when the curve is a union of $6$ lines, in which case we have 15 nodes. Hence the maximal number of nodes on a quartic is 16, and in this case they are all simple nodes (to show that $p$ is simple project from another node). A quartic which obtains these 16 nodes is called a Kummer Quartic, and we will concentrate on them below.

Since $p$ is a simple node, the tangent cone to this point is mapped to a conic under the double cover. This conic is in fact tangent to the six lines (w.o proof). Conversely, given a configuration of a conic and six lines which tangent to it in the plane, we may define the double cover of the plane ramified over the union of these 6 lines. This double cover may be mapped to $\mathbb{P}^3$, under a map which blows down the double cover of the special conic, and is an isomorphism elsewhere (w.o. proof).

=== The double plane and Kummer varieties of Jacobians ===
Starting from a smooth curve $C$ of genus 2, we may identify the Jacobian $Jac(C)$ with $Pic^2(C)$ under the map $x\mapsto x+K_C$. We now observe two facts: Since $C$ is a hyperelliptic curve the map from the symmetric product $Sym^2 C$ to $Pic^2 C$, defined by $\{p,q\}\mapsto p+q$, is the blow down of the graph of the hyperelliptic involution to the canonical divisor class. Moreover, the canonical map $C\to|K_C|^*$ is a double cover. Hence we get a double cover $Kum(C)\to Sym^2|K_C|^*$.

This double cover is the one which already appeared above: The 6 lines are the images of the odd symmetric theta divisors on $Jac(C)$, while the conic is the image of the blown-up 0. The conic is isomorphic to the canonical system via the isomorphism $T_0 Jac(C)\cong |K_C|^*$, and each of the six lines is naturally isomorphic to the dual canonical system $|K_C|^*$ via the identification of theta divisors and translates of the curve $C$. There is a 1-1 correspondence between pairs of odd symmetric theta divisors and 2-torsion points on the Jacobian given by the fact that $(\Theta+w_1)\cap(\Theta+w_2)=\{w_1-w_2,0\}$, where $w_1,w_2$ are Weierstrass points (which are the odd theta characteristics in this in genus 2). Hence the branch points of the canonical map $C\mapsto |K_C|^*$ appear on each of these copies of the canonical system as the intersection points of the lines and the tangency points of the lines and the conic.

Finally, since we know that every Kummer quartic is a Kummer variety of a Jacobian of a hyperelliptic curve, we show how to reconstruct Kummer quartic surface directly from the Jacobian of a genus 2 curve: The Jacobian of $C$ maps to the complete line complex $|O_{Jac(C)}(2\Theta_C)|\cong\mathbb{P}^{2^2-1}$ (see the article on Abelian varieties). This map factors through the Kummer variety as a degree 4 map which has 16 nodes at the images of the 2-torsion points on $Jac(C)$.

=== The quadric line complex ===
In general, a quadratic line complex defined by a single quadratic equation has 3 dimensions, so through each point in $\R^3$ there exists a whole 1-dimensional pencil of lines that sweeps out a quadratic cone. This can be constructed by intersecting the quadratic constraint with the linear constraint of "passing to a point".

However, there exists a 2-dimensional set of points where this breaks down. Specifically, at these points, the quadratic cone degenerates into two flat planes. These points are the singular points of the quadratic line complex. The set of these points is its singular surface. The singular surface is Kummer's surface.

== Level 2 structure ==
=== Kummer's 16_{6} configuration ===
There are several crucial points which relate the geometric, algebraic, and combinatorial aspects of the configuration of the nodes of the kummer quartic:

- Any symmetric odd theta divisor on $Jac(C)$ is given by the set points $\{q-w|q\in C\}$, where w is a Weierstrass point on $C$. This theta divisor contains six 2-torsion points: $w'-w$ such that $w'$ is a Weierstrass point.
- Two odd theta divisors given by Weierstrass points $w,w'$ intersect at $0$ and at $w-w'$.
- The translation of the Jacobian by a two torsion point is an isomorphism of the Jacobian as an algebraic surface, which maps the set of 2-torsion points to itself.
- In the complete linear system $|2\Theta_C|$ on $Jac(C)$, any odd theta divisor is mapped to a conic, which is the intersection of the Kummer quartic with a plane. Moreover, this complete linear system is invariant under shifts by 2-torsion points.

Hence we have a configuration of $16$ conics in $\mathbb{P}^3$; where each contains 6 nodes, and such that the intersection of each two is along 2 nodes. This configuration is called the $16_6$ configuration or the Kummer configuration.

=== Weil pairing ===
The 2-torsion points on an Abelian variety admit a symplectic bilinear form called the Weil pairing. In the case of Jacobians of curves of genus two, every nontrivial 2-torsion point is uniquely expressed as a difference between two of the six Weierstrass points of the curve. The Weil pairing is given in this case by $\langle p_1-p_2,p_3-p_4\rangle=\#\{p_1,p_2\}\cap\{p_3,p_4\}$. One can recover a lot of the group theoretic invariants of the group $Sp_4(2)$ via the geometry of the $16_6$ configuration.

=== Group theory, algebra and geometry ===
Below is a list of group theoretic invariants and their geometric incarnation in the 16_{6} configuration.

- Polar lines
- Apolar complexes
- Klein configuration
- Fundamental quadrics
- Fundamental tetrahedra
- Rosenhain tetrads
- Göpel tetrads
