= Kummer variety =

In mathematics, the Kummer variety of an abelian variety is its quotient by the map taking any element to its inverse. The Kummer variety of a 2-dimensional abelian variety is called a Kummer surface.
