= Klein configuration =

In geometry, the Klein configuration, studied by Felix Klein (1870), is a geometric configuration related to Kummer surfaces that consists of 60 points and 60 planes, with each point lying on 15 planes and each plane passing through 15 points. The configurations uses 15 pairs of lines, 12 . 13 . 14 . 15 . 16 . 23 . 24 . 25 . 26 . 34 . 35 . 36 . 45 . 46 . 56 and their reverses. The 60 points are three concurrent lines forming an odd permutation, shown below. The sixty planes are 3 coplanar lines forming even permutations, obtained by reversing the last two digits in the points. For any point or plane there are 15 members in the other set containing those 3 lines. [Hudson, 1905]

12-34-65	12-43-56	21-34-56	21-43-65	12-35-46	12-53-64
21-35-64	21-53-46	12-36-54	12-63-45	21-36-45	21-63-54
13-24-56	13-42-65	31-24-65	31-42-56	13-25-64	13-52-46
31-25-46	31-52-64	13-26-45	13-62-54	31-26-54	31-62-45
14-23-65	14-32-56	41-23-56	41-32-65	14-25-36	14-52-63
41-25-63	41-52-36	14-26-53	14-62-35	41-26-35	41-62-53
15-23-46	15-32-64	51-23-64	51-32-46	15-24-63	15-42-36
51-24-36	51-42-63	15-26-34	15-62-43	51-26-43	51-62-34
16-23-54	16-32-45	61-23-45	61-32-54	16-24-35	16-42-53
61-24-53	61-42-35	16-25-43	16-52-34	61-25-34	61-52-43

== Coordinates of points and planes ==
A possible set of coordinates for points (and also for planes!) is the following:

P_{1}=[0:0:1:1]	P_{11}=[0:1:−1:0]	P_{21}=[1:1:0:0]	P_{31}=[1:1:−1:1]	P_{41}=[1:−1:i:i]	P_{51}=[1:−i:−1:i]
P_{2}=[0:0:1:i]	P_{12}=[0:1:−i:0]	P_{22}=[1:i:0:0]	P_{32}=[1:1:−1:−1]	P_{42}=[1:−1:i:−i]	P_{52}=[1:−i:−1:−i]
P_{3}=[0:0:1:−1]	P_{13}=[1:0:0:1]	P_{23}=[1:−1:0:0]	P_{33}=[1:−1:1:1]	P_{43}=[1:−1:−i:i]	P_{53}=[1:i:i:1]
P_{4}=[0:0:1:- i]	P_{14}=[1:0:0:i]	P_{24}=[1:−i:0:0]	P_{34}=[1:−1:1:−1]	P_{44}=[1:−1:−i:−i]	P_{54}=[1:i:−i:1]
P_{5}=[0:1:0:1]	P_{15}=[1:0:0:−1]	P_{25}=[1:0:0:0]	P_{35}=[1:−1:−1:1]	P_{45}=[1:i:1:i]	P_{55}=[1:−i:i:1]
P_{6}=[0:1:0:i]	P_{16}=[1:0:0:−i]	P_{26}=[0:1:0:0]	P_{36}=[1:−1:−1:−1]	P_{46}=[1:i:1:−i]	P_{56}=[1:−i:−i:1]
P_{7}=[0:1:0:−1]	P_{17}=[1:0:1:0]	P_{27}=[0:0:1:0]	P_{37}=[1:1:i:i]	P_{47}=[1:−i:1:i]	P_{57}=[1:i:i:−1]
P_{8}=[0:1:0:−i]	P_{18}=[1:0:i:0]	P_{28}=[0:0:0:1]	P_{38}=[1:1:−i:i]	P_{48}=[1:−i:1:−i]	P_{58}=[1:i:−i:−1]
P_{9}=[0:1:1:0]	P_{19}=[1:0:−1:0]	P_{29}=[1:1:1:1]	P_{39}=[1:1:i:−i]	P_{49}=[1:i:−1:i]	P_{59}=[1:−i:i:−1]
P_{10}=[0:1:i:0]	P_{20}=[1:0:−i:0]	P_{30}=[1:1:1:−1]	P_{40}=[1:1:−i:−i]	P_{50}=[1:i:−1:−i]	P_{60}=[1:−i:−i:−1]
