= William Edwin Hamilton =

Irish Canadian journalist and entrepreneur

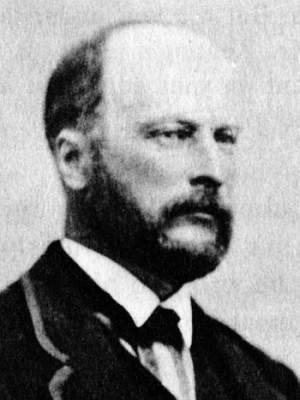
- William Edwin Hamilton
- Born: May 10, 1834; Dublin, Ireland
- Died: March 17, 1902 (aged 67); Chatham, Ontario
- Occupations: Journalist, editor, author
- Parents: Sir William Rowan Hamilton (father); Lady Helen Maria Hamilton Bayly (mother)
- Relatives: Archibald Henry Hamilton (brother), Helen Eliza Amelia O'Regan Hamilton (sister)

William Edwin Hamilton (10 May 1834 – 17 March 1902) was an Irish-Canadian journalist and entrepreneur. He was the elder son of the Irish mathematician Sir William Rowan Hamilton and Lady Helen Maria Hamilton Bayly.

== Early life in Ireland ==
William Edwin Hamilton was born at Dunsink Observatory, in the civil parish of Castleknock, Dublin. He graduated in 1857 from Trinity College Dublin and became a civil engineer, working for some years as a surveyor for railway purposes.

In 1862, Hamilton left for Nicaragua with his aunt Sydney Hamilton on a venture scheme anticipating a canal project across the Isthmus of Darien. Realizing the futility of this venture, and not used to the diet and the climate, in 1864 he returned to the Observatory and lived with his parents until his father's death in 1865.

In 1843, Hamilton's father had discovered the quaternions, a four-dimensional number system that extends the complex numbers, and he had published Lectures on Quaternions in 1853. From 1858 until his death in 1865, he worked on a second book, Elements of Quaternions, which was nearly finished when he died.

Hamilton's brother Archibald Henry Hamilton, a clergyman and executor of his father's estate, being too much engaged in his clerical duties to undertake the task, asked Hamilton to bring the Elements of Quaternions to publication. Hamilton published the manuscript as his father had left it, removing "a few typographical errors" and adding a short preface in which he wrote: "Shortly before my father's death I had several conversations with him on the subject of the Elements. In these he spoke of anticipated applications of quaternions to electricity, and to all questions in which the idea of polarity is involved — applications which he never in his own lifetime expected to be able to fully develop, bows to be reserved for the hands of another Ulysses."

== Later life in Canada ==
In 1872, Hamilton emigrated to Canada where he became a journalist and an editor, working in Bracebridge, Ontario at E.F. Stephenson's Free Grant Gazette, and as a Government Immigration Agent.

In his introduction to Guidebook and Atlas of Muskoka, Hamilton outlines the history of the region. The name he traces to Muska Ukee, or Musquakie, a leader of the Chippewa of Lakes Huron and Simcoe. He passes over the surveying by Henry Bayfield to the Free Grants Act of 1868, notes the efforts to organize as a county in Ontario, and the $2000 bonus and tax deferral given to Beardmore Brothers tannery to locate in Bracebridge. He promotes tourism to Muskoka and celebrates the local success. However rocky soil hindered agriculture, and the period was recalled in Hardscrabble: the High Cost of Free Land. The Guidebook and Atlas was "the last concerted effort to draw settlers to Muskoka."

In Hardscrabble, Williams writes: "Eccentric was W.E. Hamilton, the scholar and newspaperman, with his pet snowy owl and birch bark accessories, holed up with his books above the Free Grant Gazette."

In 1880, Hamilton finally settled in Chatham, where he was for some time editor of the Chatham Planet. After having lost his editorship in 1885, he started his own Market Guide, "a four-page, pink paper tabloid, ... in which he sold sufficient advertising to eke out a starved existence."

For several years in the late 1880s Hamilton was an alcoholic, but according to Macfarlane he took Leslie Keeley's Gold Cure. He was cured, and became in his last years a "kindly good-natured old Irishman", known for his 'amazing erudition.'

== Books ==
- 1865: Scenes in the life of a planter's daughter, etc.. George Herbert, Dublin
- 1884: Muskoka sketch. Times Printing Co., Dresden, Ontario
- 1895: Peeps at my Life, 2nd edition. Banner Printing Company, Chatham, Ontario

== Sources ==
- Hamilton, W.E. (1865), Scenes from the Life of a Planter's Daughter Dublin: George Herbert
- Hamilton, W.R. (au), Hamilton, W.E. (ed) (1866), Elements of Quaternions London: Longmans, Green, & Co
- Hamilton, W.E. (1878), Muskoka and Parry Sound. In: Kirkwood, A., Murphy, J.J., The Underdeveloped Lands in Northern & Western Ontario Toronto: Hunter, Rose & Co., pp. 56–86
- Hamilton, W.E. (1879), Muskoka and Parry Sound Districts. In: Rogers, J., Penson, S., Guide book & Atlas of Muskoka and Parry Sound Districts Toronto: H.R. Page & Co, pp. 1–35
- Hamilton, W.E. (1884), Muskoka Sketch Dresden, Ontario: Times Printing Co
- Graves, R.P. (1889), Life of Sir William Rowan Hamilton Dublin: Hodges, Figgis and Co
- Hamilton, W.E. (1895), Peeps at my life Chatham: Banner Printing Company
- Macfarlane, A. (1902), W.E. Hamilton Science 15 (389): 950
- Hankins, T.L. (1980), Sir William Rowan Hamilton Baltimore: Johns Hopkins University Press
- Wayman, P.A. (1987), Dunsink Observatory, 1785-1985 : a Bicentennial History Dublin: DIAS and the Royal Dublin Society
- Wayman, P.A. (1999), Peeps at William Edwin Hamilton Irish Astronomical Journal, 26 (1): 69-72
- Williams, D.E. (2013), Hardscrabble: The High Cost of Free Land Toronto: Dundurn Press
