= Tetrahedroid =

Irreducible nodal surface with properties similar to that of a tetrahedron

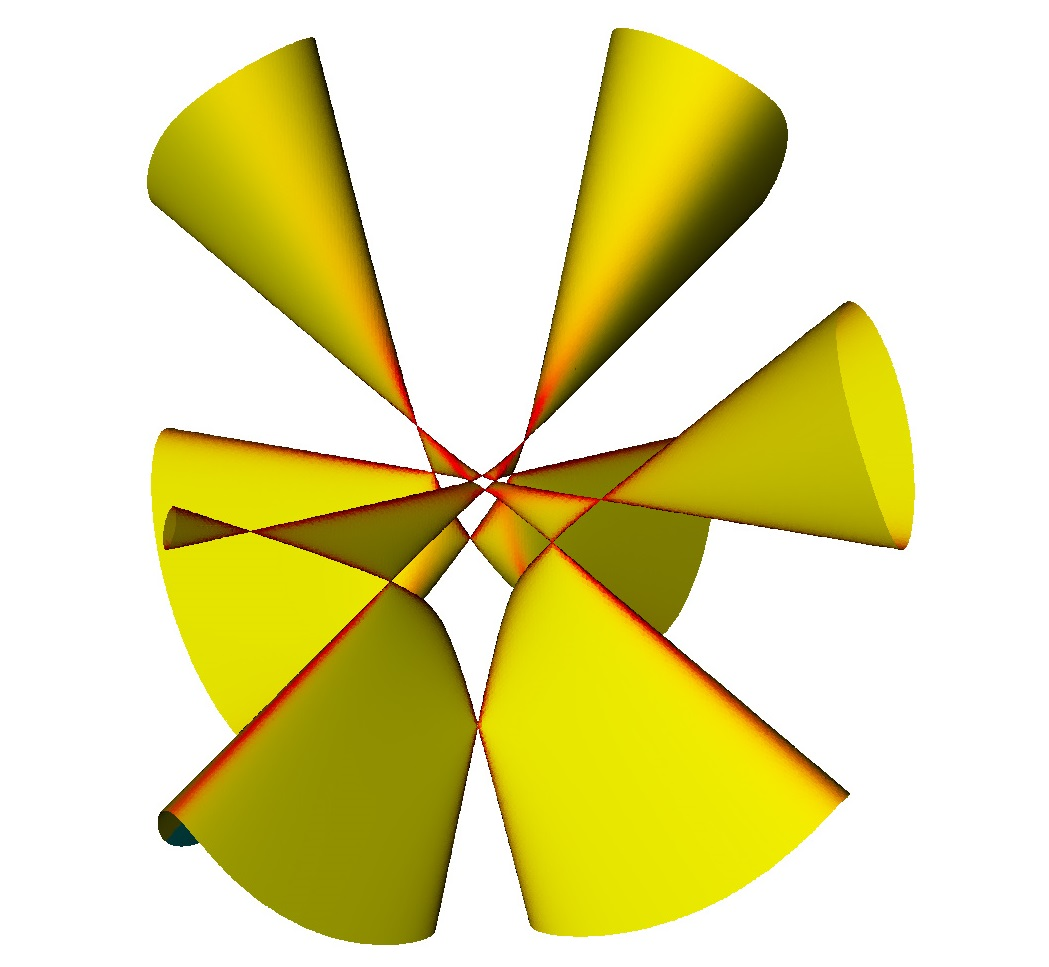
A tetrahedroid

In algebraic geometry, a tetrahedroid (or tétraédroïde) is a special kind of Kummer surface studied by Cayley (1846), with the property that the intersections with the faces of a fixed tetrahedron are given by two conics intersecting in four nodes. Tetrahedroids generalize Fresnel's wave surface.
