= Wave surface =

In mathematics, Fresnel's wave surface, found by Augustin-Jean Fresnel in 1822, is a quartic surface describing the propagation of light in an optically biaxial crystal. Wave surfaces are special cases of tetrahedroids which are in turn special cases of Kummer surfaces.

In projective coordinates (w:x:y:z) the wave surface is given by

$$\frac{a^2x^2}{x^2+y^2+z^2-a^2w^2} + \frac{b^2y^2}{x^2+y^2+z^2-b^2w^2} + \frac{c^2z^2}{x^2+y^2+z^2-c^2w^2} =0$$

They are used in the treatment of conical refractions.

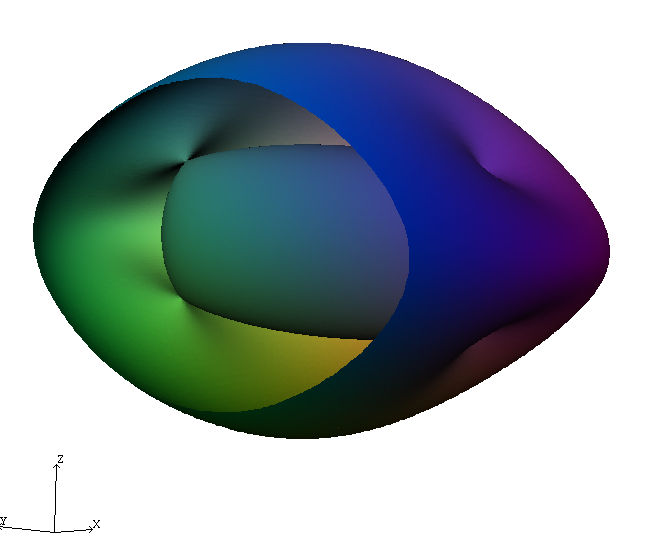
Fresnel's Wave Surface, a quartic surface describing the propagation of light in an optically biaxial crystal, $a=1, b=0.5, c=1.5, w=1$.
