= Electoral results for the district of Portland =

Australian district election results

This is a list of electoral results for the Electoral district of Portland in Victorian state elections.

== Members for Portland ==
First incarnation (1856–1904), Two members (1856–1859)
Member	Party	Term	Member	Party	Term
Hugh Childers	None	1856–1857	Daniel Hughes	None	1856–1859
John Findlay	None	1857–1859	Daniel Hughes	None	1856–1859
Norman McLeod	None	1859–1860			
William Haines	None	1860–1864			
John MacPherson	None	1864–1865			
Butler Aspinall	None	1866–1867			
James Butters	None	1868–1871			
Howard Spensley	None	1871–1873			
Thomas Must	None	1873–1877			
Thomas Cope	None	1877–1880			
Henry Wrixon	None	1880–1894			
Donald Norman McLeod	None	1894–1900			
Ewen Cameron	Conservative	1900–1904			
Second incarnation (1945–2002)
Member	Party	Term			
Robert Holt	ALP	1945–1947			
Harry Hedditch	Country	1947–1949			
Harry Hedditch	Liberal and Country	1949–1950			
Robert Holt	ALP	1950–1955			
George Gibbs	Liberal	1955–1967			
Don McKellar	Liberal	1967–1970			
Bill Lewis	ALP	1970–1973			
Don McKellar	Liberal	1973–1985			
Digby Crozier	Liberal	1985–1988			
Denis Napthine	Liberal	1988–2002			

== Election results ==
=== Elections in the 1990s ===
1999 Victorian state election: Portland
Party	Candidate	Votes	%	±%
Liberal	Denis Napthine	12,093	44.4	−11.3
Labor	Lesley Ann Jackson	8,016	29.4	−5.1
Independent	Patrick Kempton	7,153	26.2	+26.2
Total formal votes		27,262	98.1	−0.2
Informal votes		515	1.9	+0.2
Turnout		27,777	95.3	
Two-party-preferred result
Liberal	Denis Napthine	14,868	54.5	−5.9
Labor	Lesley Ann Jackson	12,394	45.5	+5.9
Liberal hold		Swing	−5.9	

1996 Victorian state election: Portland
Party	Candidate	Votes	%	±%
Liberal	Denis Napthine	15,801	55.7	−11.4
Labor	Bill Sharrock	9,781	34.5	+1.6
Independent	Bernard Wallace	2,156	7.6	+7.6
Natural Law	Marguerite White	626	2.2	+2.2
Total formal votes		28,364	98.3	+1.0
Informal votes		476	1.7	−1.0
Turnout		28,840	95.5	
Two-party-preferred result
Liberal	Denis Napthine	17,074	60.4	−6.7
Labor	Bill Sharrock	11,177	39.6	+6.7
Liberal hold		Swing	−6.7	

1992 Victorian state election: Portland
Party	Candidate	Votes	%	±%
Liberal	Denis Napthine	19,409	67.1	+20.5
Labor	Bill Sharrock	9,522	32.9	−0.6
Total formal votes		28,931	97.3	−1.1
Informal votes		789	2.7	+1.1
Turnout		29,720	96.1	
Liberal hold		Swing	+4.5	

=== Elections in the 1980s ===
1988 Victorian state election: Portland
Party	Candidate	Votes	%	±%
Liberal	Denis Napthine	12,451	46.10	−4.16
Labor	Bill Sharrock	9,359	34.65	+0.39
National	Graeme Dawson	5,197	19.24	+3.76
Total formal votes		27,007	98.36	−0.22
Informal votes		451	1.64	+0.22
Turnout		27,458	93.56	−1.29
Two-party-preferred result
Liberal	Denis Napthine	16,527	61.22	−1.69
Labor	Bill Sharrock	9,359	38.78	+1.69
Liberal hold		Swing	−1.69	

1985 Victorian state election: Portland
Party	Candidate	Votes	%	±%
Liberal	Digby Crozier	13,562	50.3	−5.4
Labor	Bill Sharrock	9,244	34.3	−4.2
National	James Patterson	4,176	15.5	+15.5
Total formal votes		26,982	98.6	
Informal votes		388	1.4	
Turnout		27,370	94.9	
Two-party-preferred result
Liberal	Digby Crozier	17,080	63.3	+4.7
Labor	Bill Sharrock	9,902	36.7	−4.7
Liberal hold		Swing	+4.7	

1982 Victorian state election: Portland
Party	Candidate	Votes	%	±%
Liberal	Don McKellar	13,903	55.5	+13.0
Labor	Bill Sharrock	9,606	38.4	+4.7
Independent	David Wilson	1,523	6.1	+6.1
Total formal votes		25,032	98.8	+0.2
Informal votes		315	1.2	−0.2
Turnout		25,347	95.6	+0.2
Two-party-preferred result
Liberal	Don McKellar	14,714	58.8	+0.8
Labor	Bill Sharrock	10,318	41.2	−0.8
Liberal hold		Swing	+0.8	

=== Elections in the 1970s ===
1979 Victorian state election: Portland
Party	Candidate	Votes	%	±%
Liberal	Don McKellar	10,294	42.5	+0.9
Labor	Bill Lewis	8,166	33.7	+1.0
National	Roger Hallam	5,765	23.8	+2.0
Total formal votes		24,225	98.6	−0.2
Informal votes		24,569	95.4	−0.1
Turnout		24,569	95.4	−0.1
Two-party-preferred result
Liberal	Don McKellar	14,063	58.0	−6.7
Labor	Bill Lewis	10,162	42.0	+6.7
Liberal hold		Swing	−6.7	

1976 Victorian state election: Portland
Party	Candidate	Votes	%	±%
Liberal	Don McKellar	9,992	41.6	+3.5
Labor	Bill Lewis	7,839	32.7	−10.2
National	Clive Mitchell	5,246	21.8	+8.2
Democratic Labor	Patrick Healy	932	3.9	−1.5
Total formal votes		24,009	98.8	
Informal votes		290	1.2	
Turnout		24,299	95.5	
Two-party-preferred result
Liberal	Don McKellar	15,530	64.7	+11.1
Labor	Bill Lewis	8,479	35.3	−11.1
Liberal hold		Swing	+11.1	

1973 Victorian state election: Portland
Party	Candidate	Votes	%	±%
Labor	Bill Lewis	7,754	41.7	+3.4
Liberal	Don McKellar	7,119	38.3	+6.1
Country	Diana Silvester	2,709	14.6	−6.1
Democratic Labor	Maurice Purcell	1,004	5.4	−3.3
Total formal votes		18,586	98.2	−0.3
Informal votes		333	1.8	+0.3
Turnout		18,919	95.6	−1.1
Two-party-preferred result
Liberal	Don McKellar	10,245	54.6	+7.4
Labor	Bill Lewis	8,341	45.4	−7.4
Liberal gain from Labor		Swing	+7.4	

1970 Victorian state election: Portland
Party	Candidate	Votes	%	±%
Labor	Bill Lewis	6,807	38.3	+5.6
Liberal	Don McKellar	5,726	32.2	+3.1
Country	Alma Uebergang	3,681	20.7	−8.1
Democratic Labor	Adrian McInerney	1,547	8.7	−0.8
Total formal votes		17,761	98.5	+0.4
Informal votes		272	1.5	−0.4
Turnout		18,033	96.7	+0.1
Two-party-preferred result
Labor	Bill Lewis	9,371	52.8	+6.4
Liberal	Don McKellar	8,390	47.2	−6.4
Labor gain from Liberal		Swing	+6.4	

=== Elections in the 1960s ===
1967 Victorian state election: Portland
Party	Candidate	Votes	%	±%
Labor	John McClure	5,638	32.7	−2.2
Liberal	Don McKellar	5,017	29.1	−3.3
Country	Clive Mitchell	4,966	28.8	+5.6
Democratic Labor	Frederick Baulch	1,641	9.5	0.0
Total formal votes		17,262	98.1	
Informal votes		338	1.9	
Turnout		17,600	96.6	
Two-party-preferred result
Liberal	Don McKellar	9,246	53.6	−5.2
Labor	John McClure	8,016	46.4	+5.2
Liberal hold		Swing	−5.2	

1964 Victorian state election: Portland
Party	Candidate	Votes	%	±%
Liberal and Country	George Gibbs	7,948	36.1	+3.0
Labor	George Gowty	6,784	30.8	−2.3
Democratic Labor	John Russell	3,730	16.9	−1.9
Country	Leonard Mibus	3,577	16.2	+1.1
Total formal votes		22,039	98.6	−0.1
Informal votes		313	1.4	+0.1
Turnout		22,352	95.8	+0.6
Two-party-preferred result
Liberal and Country	George Gibbs	14,289	64.8	+2.5
Labor	George Gowty	7,750	35.2	−2.5
Liberal and Country hold		Swing	+2.5	

1961 Victorian state election: Portland
Party	Candidate	Votes	%	±%
Labor	George Gowty	7,163	33.1	−3.9
Liberal and Country	George Gibbs	7,160	33.1	−13.3
Democratic Labor	John Russell	4,056	18.8	+2.2
Country	Stewart Price	3,255	15.1	+15.1
Total formal votes		21,634	98.7	−0.6
Informal votes		291	1.3	+0.6
Turnout		21,925	96.4	+0.3
Two-party-preferred result
Liberal and Country	George Gibbs	13,477	62.3	+2.3
Labor	George Gowty	8,157	37.7	−2.3
Liberal and Country hold		Swing	+2.3	

=== Elections in the 1950s ===
1958 Victorian state election: Portland
Party	Candidate	Votes	%	±%
Liberal and Country	George Gibbs	9,741	46.4	
Labor	Malcolm Gladman	7,781	37.0	
Democratic Labor	John Russell	3,482	16.6	
Total formal votes		21,004	99.3	
Informal votes		155	0.7	
Turnout		21,159	96.1	
Two-party-preferred result
Liberal and Country	George Gibbs	12,603	60.0	
Labor	Malcolm Gladman	8,401	40.0	
Liberal and Country hold		Swing		

1955 Victorian state election: Portland
Party	Candidate	Votes	%	±%
Labor	Malcolm Gladman	6,753	37.3	
Liberal and Country	George Gibbs	5,629	31.1	
Country	Cyril Brimblecombe	2,886	16.0	
Labor (A-C)	William O'Sullivan	2,818	15.6	
Total formal votes		18,086	98.5	
Informal votes		275	1.5	
Turnout		18,361	96.2	
Two-party-preferred result
Liberal and Country	George Gibbs	10,495	58.0	
Labor	Malcolm Gladman	7,591	42.0	
Liberal and Country hold		Swing		

1952 Victorian state election: Portland
Party	Candidate	Votes	%	±%
Labor	Robert Holt	9,543	64.8	+13.5
Liberal and Country	Howard Turner	5,190	35.2	−3.0
Total formal votes		14,733	99.2	−0.3
Informal votes		117	0.8	+0.3
Turnout		14,850	96.1	−0.1
Labor hold		Swing	+12.5	

1950 Victorian state election: Portland
Party	Candidate	Votes	%	±%
Labor	Robert Holt	7,392	51.3	+3.8
Liberal and Country	Harry Hedditch	5,508	38.2	+15.4
Country	Charles Buerckner	1,510	10.5	−19.1
Total formal votes		14,410	99.5	+0.3
Informal votes		71	0.5	−0.3
Turnout		14,481	96.2	+0.4
Two-party-preferred result
Labor	Robert Holt	7,543	52.3	+2.8
Liberal and Country	Harry Hedditch	6,867	47.7	+47.7
Labor gain from Liberal and Country		Swing	+2.8	

=== Elections in the 1940s ===
1947 Victorian state election: Portland
Party	Candidate	Votes	%	±%
Labor	Robert Holt	6,576	47.5	−7.0
Country	Harry Hedditch	4,100	29.6	−15.9
Liberal	James Lindsey	3,161	22.8	+22.8
Total formal votes		13,837	99.2	−0.3
Informal votes		115	0.8	+0.3
Turnout		13,952	95.8	+5.0
Two-party-preferred result
Country	Harry Hedditch	6,994	50.5	+5.0
Labor	Robert Holt	6,843	49.5	−5.0
Country gain from Labor		Swing	+5.0	

1945 Victorian state election: Portland
Party	Candidate	Votes	%	±%
Labor	Robert Holt	6,913	54.5	
Country	Harry Hedditch	5,779	45.5	
Total formal votes		12,692	99.5	
Informal votes		66	0.5	
Turnout		12,758	90.8	
Labor gain from Country		Swing		
