= Electoral results for the Western Province (Victoria) =

Victoria, Australia, district election results

This is a list of electoral results for the Western Province in Victorian state elections.

== Members for Western Province ==
Member 1	Party	Year	Member 2	Party	Member 3	Party	Member 4	Party	Member 5	Party
Stephen Henty		1856	Charles Vaughan		James Palmer		Andrew Cruikshank		Daniel Tierney	
Stephen Henty		1858	Charles Vaughan		James Palmer		Henry Miller		Daniel Tierney	
Stephen Henty		1858	Charles Vaughan		James Palmer		Henry Miller		Daniel Tierney	
Stephen Henty		1859	Charles Vaughan		James Palmer		Henry Miller		Niel Black	
Stephen Henty		1860	Charles Vaughan		James Palmer		Henry Miller		Niel Black	
Stephen Henty		1862	Charles Vaughan		James Palmer		Henry Miller		Niel Black	
Stephen Henty		1864	Charles Sladen		James Palmer		Henry Miller		Niel Black	
Stephen Henty		1864	Charles Sladen		James Palmer		Henry Miller		Niel Black	
Stephen Henty		1866	Charles Sladen		James Palmer		James Strachan		Niel Black	
Stephen Henty		1866	Charles Sladen		James Palmer		James Strachan		Niel Black	
Stephen Henty		1868	Robert Simson		James Palmer		James Strachan		Niel Black	
Stephen Henty		1870	Robert Simson		Thomas McKellar		James Strachan		Niel Black	
William Skene		1870	Robert Simson		Thomas McKellar		James Strachan		Niel Black	
William Skene		1872	Robert Simson		Thomas McKellar		James Strachan		Niel Black	
William Skene		1874	Robert Simson		Thomas McKellar		Thomas Bromell		Niel Black	
William Skene		1875	Robert Simson		Samuel Wilson		Thomas Bromell		Niel Black	
Charles Sladen		1876	Robert Simson		Samuel Wilson		Thomas Bromell		Niel Black	
Charles Sladen		1878	William Ross		Samuel Wilson		Thomas Bromell		Niel Black	
Charles Sladen		1880	William Ross		Samuel Wilson		Thomas Bromell		Robert Simson	
Charles Sladen		1880	William Ross		Samuel Wilson		Thomas Bromell		Robert Simson	
Charles Sladen		1881	William Ross		Thomas Cumming		Thomas Bromell		Robert Simson	
Nathan Thornley		1882	William Ross		Thomas Cumming					
Nathan Thornley		1884	William Ross		Thomas Cumming					
Nathan Thornley		1886	William Ross		Thomas Cumming					
Nathan Thornley		1888	Samuel Cooke		Thomas Cumming					
Nathan Thornley		1888	Samuel Cooke		Agar Wynne					
Nathan Thornley		1890	Samuel Cooke		Agar Wynne					
Nathan Thornley		1892	Samuel Cooke		Agar Wynne					
Nathan Thornley		1894	Samuel Cooke		Agar Wynne					
Nathan Thornley		1896	Samuel Cooke		Agar Wynne					
Nathan Thornley		1898	Samuel Cooke		Agar Wynne					
Nathan Thornley		1900	Samuel Cooke		Agar Wynne					
Nathan Thornley		1901	Walter Manifold		Agar Wynne					
Nathan Thornley		1902	Walter Manifold		Agar Wynne					
Robert Ritchie		1903	Walter Manifold		Agar Wynne					
Robert Ritchie		1903	Walter Manifold		Alexander MacLeod					
Robert Ritchie		1904	Walter Manifold							
Edward White		1907	Walter Manifold							
Edward White		1910	Walter Manifold							
Edward White		1913	Walter Manifold							
Edward White		1916	Walter Manifold							
Edward White	Nationalist	1917	Walter Manifold	Nationalist						
Edward White	Nationalist	1919	Walter Manifold	Nationalist						
Edward White	Nationalist	1922	Walter Manifold	Nationalist						
Edward White	Nationalist	1924	Marcus Saltau	Nationalist						
Edward White	Nationalist	1925	Marcus Saltau	Nationalist						
Edward White	Nationalist	1928	Marcus Saltau	Nationalist						
William Williamson	Independent	1931	Marcus Saltau	Nationalist						
William Williamson	Independent	1931	Marcus Saltau	United Australia						
William Williamson	Independent	1934	Marcus Saltau	United Australia						
Leonard Rodda^{[r]}	Country	1937	Marcus Saltau	United Australia						
Leonard Rodda^{[r]}	Country	1940	Robert Rankin	Country						
Leonard Rodda^{[r]}	Country	1943	Robert Rankin	Country						
Leonard Rodda	Country	1943	Robert Rankin	Country						
Leonard Rodda	Country	1945	Robert Rankin	Country						
Leonard Rodda	Country	1946	Robert Rankin	Country						
Hugh MacLeod	Independent	1946	Robert Rankin	Country						
Hugh MacLeod	Liberal and Country	1949	Robert Rankin	Liberal and Country						
Hugh MacLeod	Liberal and Country	1949	Robert Rankin	Liberal and Country						
Hugh MacLeod	Electoral Reform	1952	Robert Rankin	Liberal and Country						
Hugh MacLeod	Electoral Reform	1952	David Arnott	Labor						
Ronald Mack	Liberal and Country	1955	David Arnott	Labor						
Ronald Mack	Liberal and Country	1958	Kenneth Gross	Liberal and Country						
Ronald Mack	Liberal and Country	1961	Kenneth Gross	Liberal and Country						
Ronald Mack	Liberal and Country	1964	Kenneth Gross	Liberal and Country						
Ronald Mack	Liberal	1965	Kenneth Gross	Liberal						
Ronald Mack	Liberal	1967	Kenneth Gross	Liberal						
Clive Mitchell	Country	1968	Kenneth Gross	Liberal						
Clive Mitchell	Country	1970	Kenneth Gross	Liberal						
Digby Crozier	Liberal	1973	Kenneth Gross	Liberal						
Digby Crozier	Liberal	1976	Bruce Chamberlain	Liberal						
Digby Crozier	Liberal	1979	Bruce Chamberlain	Liberal						
Digby Crozier	Liberal	1982	Bruce Chamberlain	Liberal						
Roger Hallam	National	1985	Bruce Chamberlain	Liberal						
Roger Hallam	National	1988	Bruce Chamberlain	Liberal						
Roger Hallam	National	1992	Bruce Chamberlain	Liberal						
Roger Hallam	National	1996	Bruce Chamberlain	Liberal						
Roger Hallam	National	1999	Bruce Chamberlain	Liberal						
David Koch	Liberal	2002	John Vogels	Liberal						

^{[r]} Rodda resigned in July 1943, re-elected in October 1943

== Election results ==
=== Elections in the 2000s ===
2002 Victorian state election: Western by-election
Party	Candidate	Votes	%	±%
Liberal	David Koch	46,321	38.8	+38.8
Labor	Stephen Clegg	40,984	34.3	−0.7
National	David Miller	21,263	17.8	−41.7
Greens	Sally-Anne Brown	10,973	9.2	+9.2
Total formal votes		119,541	96.7	−1.1
Informal votes		4,019	3.3	+1.1
Turnout		123,560	94.5	
Two-party-preferred result
Liberal	David Koch	66,953	56.0	+56.0
Labor	Stephen Clegg	52,588	44.0	+5.9
Liberal gain from National		Swing	N/A	

This election followed the vacancy caused by the resignation of Roger Hallam, who resigned. The by-election was conducted on the same day as the 2002 election, but used the old electoral boundaries.

2002 Victorian state election: Western Province
Party	Candidate	Votes	%	±%
Liberal	John Vogels	56,497	40.0	+32.5
Labor	Lesley Jackson	54,815	38.8	+0.8
National	Greg Walcott	20,142	14.3	−34.9
Greens	Viola Spokes	9,823	7.0	+7.0
Total formal votes		141,277	96.8	−0.8
Informal votes		4,611	3.2	+0.8
Turnout		145,888	94.9	
Two-party-preferred result
Liberal	John Vogels	76,772	54.3	−4.7
Labor	Lesley Jackson	64,505	45.7	+4.7
Liberal hold		Swing	−4.7	

=== Elections in the 1990s ===
1999 Victorian state election: Western Province
Party	Candidate	Votes	%	±%
National	Roger Hallam	71,778	59.5	+59.5
Labor	Peter Mitchell	42,151	35.0	+4.4
Reform	Leigh McDonald	6,617	5.5	+5.5
Total formal votes		120,546	97.8	−0.4
Informal votes		2,737	2.2	+0.4
Turnout		123,283	95.4	
Two-party-preferred result
National	Roger Hallam	74,660	61.9	+61.9
Labor	Peter Mitchell	45,884	38.1	+2.8
National hold		Swing	+61.9	

1996 Victorian state election: Western Province
Party	Candidate	Votes	%	±%
Liberal	Bruce Chamberlain	73,811	60.5	+60.5
Labor	Elizabeth Wilson	37,351	30.6	+3.2
Democrats	Don Anderson	8,085	6.6	+6.6
Democratic Labor	Christine Dodd	2,837	2.3	−2.8
Total formal votes		122,084	98.2	+0.9
Informal votes		2,276	1.8	−0.9
Turnout		124,360	95.8	
Two-party-preferred result
Liberal	Bruce Chamberlain	78,769	64.7	−6.0
Labor	Elizabeth Wilson	42,897	35.3	+6.0
Liberal hold		Swing	−6.0	

1992 Victorian state election: Western Province
Party	Candidate	Votes	%	±%
National	Roger Hallam	82,017	67.6	+45.9
Labor	David Broderick	33,198	27.3	−0.7
Democratic Labor	Christine Dodd	6,186	5.1	+5.1
Total formal votes		121,401	97.2	−0.7
Informal votes		3,461	2.8	+0.7
Turnout		124,862	96.6	
Two-party-preferred result
National	Roger Hallam	85,770	70.7	+70.7
Labor	David Broderick	35,590	29.3	−2.0
National hold		Swing	+2.0	

=== Elections in the 1980s ===
1988 Victorian state election: Western Province
Party	Candidate	Votes	%	±%
Liberal	Bruce Chamberlain	53,370	48.1	+6.8
Labor	Kevin Watt	29,988	27.0	−0.6
National	James Saunders	25,289	22.8	−8.3
Independent	Julie Jennings	2,345	2.1	+2.1
Total formal votes		110,992	98.0	−0.4
Informal votes		2,253	2.0	+0.4
Turnout		113,245	94.7	−0.6
Two-party-preferred result
Liberal	Bruce Chamberlain	77,111	69.5	+24.2
Labor	Kevin Watt	33,870	30.5	+30.5
Liberal hold		Swing	N/A	

1985 Victorian state election: Western Province
Party	Candidate	Votes	%	±%
Liberal	Henry Wyld	45,393	41.3	
National	Roger Hallam	34,157	31.1	
Labor	Brian Clarke	30,335	27.6	
Total formal votes		109,885	98.4	
Informal votes		1,802	1.6	
Turnout		111,687	95.3	
Two-candidate-preferred result
National	Roger Hallam	60,064	54.7	
Liberal	Henry Wyld	49,821	45.3	
National gain from Liberal		Swing	N/A	

1982 Victorian state election: Western Province
Party	Candidate	Votes	%	±%
Liberal	Bruce Chamberlain	49,661	62.6	+11.9
Labor	Allan Sargent	29,618	37.4	+3.8
Total formal votes		79,279	98.1	+0.2
Informal votes		1,545	1.9	−0.2
Turnout		80,824	95.2	0.0
Liberal hold		Swing	−1.4	

=== Elections in the 1970s ===
1979 Victorian state election: Western Province
Party	Candidate	Votes	%	±%
Liberal	Digby Crozier	39,262	50.8	+3.4
Labor	Henry Birrell	25,969	33.6	+4.0
National	Clive Mitchell	12,126	15.7	−7.3
Total formal votes		77,357	97.9	−0.5
Informal votes		1,640	2.1	+0.5
Turnout		78,997	95.2	0.0
Liberal hold		Swing	N/A	

- Preferences were not distributed.

1976 Victorian state election: Western Province
Party	Candidate	Votes	%	±%
Liberal	Bruce Chamberlain	36,209	47.4	
Labor	Thomas Windsor	22,600	29.6	
National	Linden Cameron	17,548	23.0	
Total formal votes		76,357	98.4	
Informal votes		1,277	1.6	
Turnout		77,634	95.2	
Two-party-preferred result
Liberal	Bruce Chamberlain	52,214	68.4	
Labor	Thomas Windsor	24,143	31.6	
Liberal hold		Swing		

1973 Victorian state election: Western Province
Party	Candidate	Votes	%	±%
Liberal	Digby Crozier	23,061	37.8	+3.8
Labor	Donald Grossman	19,404	31.8	+0.2
Country	Clive Mitchell	12,725	20.8	+0.6
Democratic Labor	Alan Beattie	5,898	9.7	−4.5
Total formal votes		61,088	97.8	+0.1
Informal votes		1,396	2.2	−0.1
Turnout		62,484	95.9	−0.9
Two-party-preferred result
Liberal	Digby Crozier	38,562	63.1	+8.2
Labor	Donald Grossman	22,526	36.9	−8.2
Liberal gain from Country		Swing	N/A	

1970 Victorian state election: Western Province
Party	Candidate	Votes	%	±%
Liberal	Kenneth Gross	19,372	34.0	−3.1
Labor	Thomas Windsor	18,039	31.6	+4.8
Country	Linden Cameron	11,517	20.2	−2.2
Democratic Labor	Alan Beattie	8,081	14.2	+0.5
Total formal votes		57,009	97.7	+0.2
Informal votes		1,320	2.3	−0.2
Turnout		58,329	96.8	+0.1
Two-party-preferred result
Liberal	Kenneth Gross	31,271	54.9	−4.6
Labor	Thomas Windsor	25,738	45.1	+4.6
Liberal hold		Swing	−4.6	

=== Elections in the 1960s ===
1968 Western Province state by-election
Party	Candidate	Votes	%	±%
Liberal	Digby Crozier	15,881	28.9	−8.2
Labor	T C Windsor	15,216	27.7	+0.9
Country	Clive Mitchell	13,497	24.5	+2.1
Democratic Labor	Alan Beattie	6,539	11.9	−1.8
Independent	Malcolm Gladman	3,873	7.0	+7.0
Total formal votes		55,006	98.6	+1.1
Informal votes		761	1.4	−1.1
Turnout		55,767	93.4	−3.3
Two-candidate-preferred result
Country	Clive Mitchell	32,335	58.8	+58.8
Liberal	Digby Crozier	22,671	41.2	−18.4
Country gain from Liberal		Swing	N/A	

- This by-election was caused by the death of Ronald Mack.

1967 Victorian state election: Western Province
Party	Candidate	Votes	%	±%
Liberal	Ronald Mack	20,600	37.1	
Labor	Edward Lewis	14,865	26.8	
Country	Linden Cameron	12,431	22.4	
Democratic Labor	Alan Beattie	7,626	13.7	
Total formal votes		55,522	97.5	
Informal votes		1,433	2.5	
Turnout		56,955	96.7	
Two-party-preferred result
Liberal	Ronald Mack	33,094	59.6	
Labor	Edward Lewis	22,428	40.4	
Liberal hold		Swing		

1964 Victorian state election: Western Province
Party	Candidate	Votes	%	±%
Liberal and Country	Kenneth Gross	19,700	36.2	−8.7
Labor	Bill Lewis	15,521	28.5	−10.4
Country	Linden Cameron	12,366	22.7	+22.7
Democratic Labor	Johannes Smoes	6,809	12.5	−3.7
Total formal votes		54,396	98.2	−0.2
Informal votes		975	1.8	+0.2
Turnout		55,371	96.1	−0.3
Two-party-preferred result
Liberal and Country	Kenneth Gross	36,117	66.4	+7.1
Labor	Bill Lewis	18,279	33.6	−7.1
Liberal and Country hold		Swing	+7.1	

1961 Victorian state election: Western Province
Party	Candidate	Votes	%	±%
Liberal and Country	Ronald Mack	24,168	44.9	−2.3
Labor	James McIntyre	20,909	38.9	−0.6
Democratic Labor	Geoffrey White	8,727	16.2	+2.9
Total formal votes		53,804	98.4	−0.8
Informal votes		861	1.6	+0.8
Turnout		54,665	96.4	+0.9
Two-party-preferred result
Liberal and Country	Ronald Mack	31,894	59.3	+1.6
Labor	James McIntyre	21,910	40.7	−1.6
Liberal and Country hold		Swing	+1.6	

=== Elections in the 1950s ===
1958 Victorian Legislative Council election: Western Province
Party	Candidate	Votes	%	±%
Liberal and Country	Kenneth Gross	25,004	47.2	−1.6
Labor	David Arnott	20,917	39.5	+8.6
Democratic Labor	James Eveston	7,047	13.3	+2.1
Total formal votes		52,968	99.2	+0.3
Informal votes		441	0.8	−0.3
Turnout		53,409	95.5	+4.2
Two-party-preferred result
Liberal and Country	Kenneth Gross	30,563	57.7	−8.9
Labor	David Arnott	22,405	42.3	+8.9
Liberal and Country gain from Labor		Swing	−8.9	
