= Hugh MacLeod (politician) =

Australian politician

Hugh Vernon MacLeod (23 January 1882 – 24 September 1955) was an Australian politician.

MacLeod was born at Busselton to grazier Donald Norman McLeod and Charlotte Harriett Bussel. Both his father and his grandfather Norman McLeod served in the Victorian Parliament. MacLeod (spelled thus) managed cattle stations in Queensland before returning to Victoria, where he managed the family property. During World War I he served with the 13th Light Horse in Gallipoli and the Middle East. On 3 December 1919 he married theatre actress Wilhelmina Laura Elsie Landquest, who was known by her stage name Elsie Langley. MacLeod inherited a Western Australian property at Minilya but sold it in 1920, instead running his grandfather's dairy farm and cattle stud at Tyrendarra.

In 1946 MacLeod was elected to the Victorian Legislative Council as an independent member for Western Province. He joined the Liberal and Country Party in 1949, and was a supporter of Thomas Hollway. He voted to refuse supply to the McDonald Country Party government in 1952 and was Minister of Agriculture and State Development in the seventy-hour Hollway ministry that resulted. Having been expelled from the Liberal and Country Party, he was defeated as a Victorian Liberal Party candidate in 1955. MacLeod died later that year at Portland.

Victorian Legislative Council
Preceded by Leonard Rodda	Member for Western; 1952–1958; Served alongside: Robert Rankin; David Arnott	Succeeded by Ronald Mack
