= Purser (surname) =

Purser is an occupational surname, denoting a maker of purses, or a treasurer or bursar.

Notable persons with that surname include:

- Andrew Purser (born 1958), Australian rules footballer
- Ben Purser (born 1990), Australian basketball player
- Cecil Purser (1862–1953), Australian physician
- Dorothy Ann Purser (21st century), American screenwriter
- Frederick Purser (1839–1910), Irish mathematician
- John Purser (musician) (born 1942), Scottish composer
- John Purser (mathematician) (1835–1903), Irish mathematician
- Louis Claude Purser (1854–1932), Irish translator
- Philip Purser (1925–2022), British novelist
- Sarah Purser (1848–1943), Irish artist
- Wayne Purser (born 1980), English footballer
