= William John Lewis =

William John Lewis may refer to:

- William Lewis (journalist) (born 1969), CEO and publisher of The Washington Post
- Bill Lewis (Australian politician) (1916–1991)
