= Thomas David Spearman =

Irish mathematician

T. David Spearman
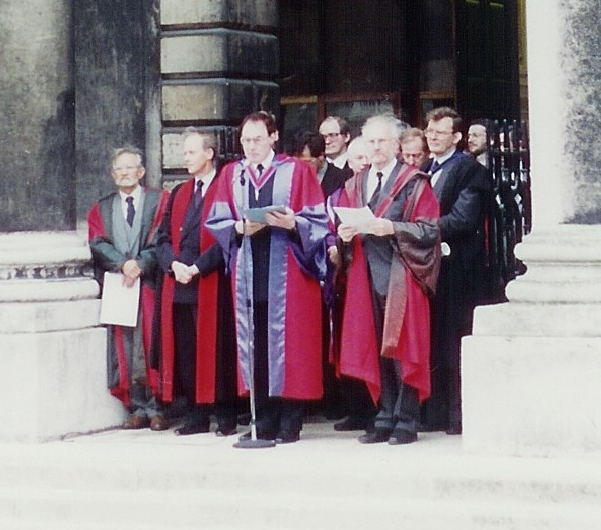
- David Spearman, acting as vice provost, to the left of Provost Tom Mitchel announcing new scholars and fellows on Trinity Monday 1994 in Trinity College Dublin.
- Born: 1937 (age 88–89); Dublin, Ireland
- Education: University of Cambridge, Trinity College Dublin
- Scientific career
- Fields: Mathematical Physics
- Workplaces: Trinity College Dublin, University of Durham, University of Illinois, University College London
- Academic advisors: Jim Hamilton

Thomas David Spearman (born 1937, known as David Spearman) is an Irish mathematical physicist who is Fellow Emeritus of Trinity College Dublin (TCD), where he spent his career and at various times served as head of the department of pure and applied mathematics, bursar, vice provost and pro-chancellor. He was Professor of Natural Philosophy at TCD from 1966 to 1997. He is the author of 400 years of Mathematics at TCD (1592–1992).

== Life and career ==
Born Thomas David Spearman in Dublin in 1937, was educated at Greenlanes School and Mountjoy School. He then attended TCD, where he was a Scholar in Mathematics in 1956 and was awarded a BA in mathematics and natural philosophy in 1959. He did his PhD on "Problems in Pion Physics", (awarded by Cambridge in 1961) under fellow Irishman Jim Hamilton, over a period in which the latter moved from Cambridge to the University of London. He was at University College London 1961–1962, the University of Illinois 1962–1964 and the University of Durham 1964–1966. In 1966 he was appointed to the chair of natural philosophy back at his alma mater, TCD, and in 1969 was elected a Fellow of TCD, and subsequently became a Senior Fellow.

In 1970 Spearman published the book Elementary Particle Theory (North Holland), co-written with A. D. Martin. In time, he served in numerous administrative roles, including head of the department of pure and applied mathematics (1966–1991), bursar (1974–1977), and vice provost (1991–1997). From 1972 to 1987 he was chairman of the board of Mount Temple Comprehensive School. He was Vice President of the European Science Foundation (1983–1989). He supervised three PhDs, authored of 400 years of Mathematics at TCD (1592–1992), and retired in 1997.

He has remained active in college and other affairs, being TCD pro-chancellor and President of the Royal Irish Academy (1999–2002). He was chairman of the European Academy's Science Advisory Council (EASAC) (2004–2007).
