= John Purser =

John Purser may refer to:

- John Purser (mathematician) (1835–1903), Irish mathematician
- John Purser (musician) (born 1942), Scottish composer
