= DHO =

DHO may refer to:

- Dho, a village in Nepal
- Dhodia language, spoken in Gujarat, India
- Dholpur Junction railway station, in India
- Digital Humanities Observatory
- Hohenstein-Ernstthal station, in Germany
- Semiheavy water
- Dansk-historieopgave, in Denmark
