= Matthew Fry =

Matthew Fry may refer to:

- Matthew Wyatt Joseph Fry (1863–1943), an Irish mathematician and academic
- Matt Fry (born 1990), an English semi-professional footballer

== See also ==
- Matt Frei (born 1963; homophone of Fry), British journalist and broadcaster
