= Clive Mitchell =

Clive Mitchell may refer to:

- Clive Mitchell (politician) (1918–2010), Australian politician
- Clive Mitchell (EastEnders), fictional character
- Clive Mitchell (Benidorm), fictional character
- Clive Mitchell (film director), see BAFTA Award for Best Short Film
