= Richard Townsend (mathematician) =

Irish mathematician

Richard Townsend (April 1821 – October 1884) was an Irish mathematician, writer, and academic.

== Life and career ==
Townsend was born in Baltimore, County Cork and was educated at Trinity College Dublin (BA 1842, MA 1852). He was appointed Professor of Natural Philosophy there in 1870 and altogether spent four decades on the staff at TCD. His book on geometry was highly regarded. He wrote many articles for the Cambridge and Dublin Mathematical Journal.

== Books ==
- Chapters on the Modern Geometry of the Point, Line, and Circle (Vol. I) (Hodges, Smith, and Co, 1863)
