= Thomas Must =

Australian politician (1815–1905)

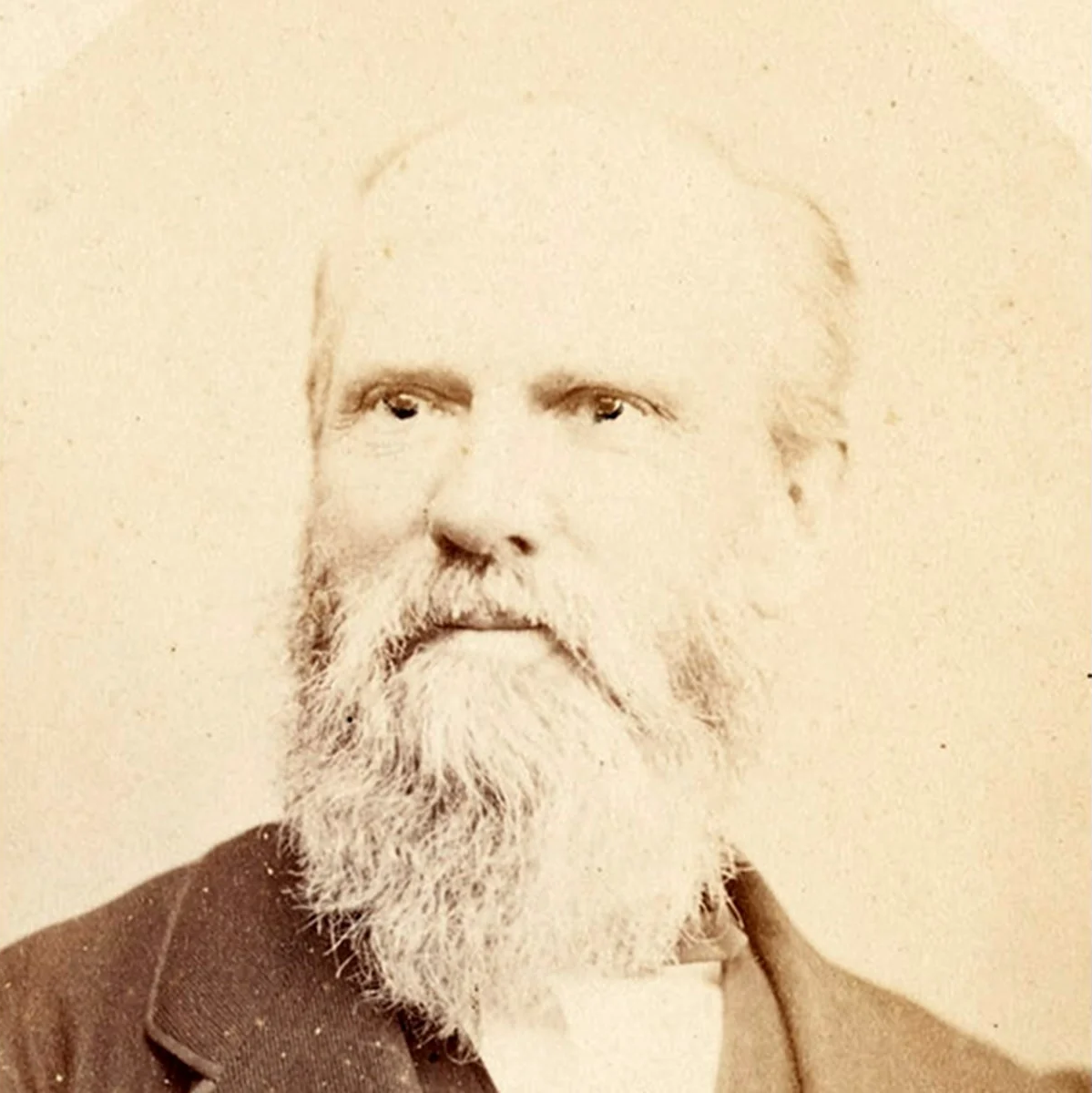

Member of the Victorian Legislative Assembly for Portland
- In office 20 May 1873 – 11 May 1877
- Preceded by: Howard Spensley
- Succeeded by: Thomas Cope

Personal details
- Born: 30 January 1815 London, England
- Died: 2 September 1905 (aged 90) Portland, Victoria, Australia

Thomas Must (30 January 1815 – 2 September 1905) was an English-born Australian politician. He served as a member of the Victorian Legislative Assembly and as a Justice of the Peace.

== Biography ==
Must was born on 30 January 1815 in London. He emigrated to Sydney, arriving in 1833 aboard the Guardian.

On 25 August 1842, Must married Anne Wilcox. They had eight daughters and four sons.

In Sydney, Must worked as a merchant. He moved to Portland in 1846 to establish an agency there. He served on Portland City Council at various points from 1856 to 1871, including as Mayor in 1864.

Must was elected to represent Portland in the Victorian Legislative Assembly on 20 May 1873 at the 1873 Portland colonial by-election. The by-election was held following the resignation of Howard Spensley.

He did not contest the 1877 Victorian colonial election. This is because districts were redistributed. As a result, Portland then encompassed a large region previously represented by Thomas Cope, who won the seat of Portland at the 1877 election.

Must died on 2 September 1905 in his house in Portland.
