= University Professor of Natural Philosophy (Dublin) =

The University Chair of Natural Philosophy is a professorship in the School of Mathematics at Trinity College Dublin. It was established in 1847.

From 1724 to 1847 the Erasmus Smith's Professorship of Natural and Experimental Philosophy had a mathematical and theoretical orientation, with many holders being also mathematicians. Several, such as Bartholomew Lloyd (1822) and James MacCullagh (1843), previously held the Erasmus Smith's Professor of Mathematics position. In 1847 the University Chair of Natural Philosophy was founded and took on the applied mathematics and theoretical physics role, while Erasmus Smith's Professor of Natural and Experimental Philosophy (1724) effectively became the chair of experimental physics.

== List of the professors ==
- 1847–1870: John Jellett (1817–1888)
- 1870–1884: Richard Townsend (1821–1884)
- 1884–1890: Benjamin Williamson (1827–1916)
- 1890–1902: Francis Tarleton (1841–1920)
- 1902–1910: Frederick Purser (1839–1910)
- 1910–1925: Matthew Fry (1863–1943)
- 1925–1930: J. L. Synge (1897–1995)
- 1930–1957: Albert McConnell (1903–1993)
- 1957–1962: vacant
- 1962–1966: John Chisholm (born 1926)
- 1966–1997: David Spearman (born 1937)
- 1997–2002: vacant
- 2002–present: Samson Shatashvili

== See also ==
- List of professorships at the University of Dublin
- Natural philosophy
