= Chirritta =

Pastoral lease in Western Australia

Coordinates: 21.01220°S 116.80754°E

Location in Western Australia

Chirritta Station, most often referred to as Chirritta or Cherratta, is a pastoral lease operating as a sheep station in Western Australia.

The property is situated approximately 46 kilometres (29 mi) south of Roebourne and 86 kilometres (53 mi) north east of Pannawonica in the Pilbara region of Western Australia. A portion of the Maitland River runs through the property.

The property was established by Donald Norman McLeod in 1872. He returned to Victoria in 1882 and purchased Yannarie Estate near Portland, and later returned to Western Australia, acquiring Minilya Station. In 1884 Chirritta was reportedly sold for £18,000. By 1888 the property was put up for auction on behalf of D.N. McLeod and Company; the property was stocked with 17,000 sheep along with about 200 head of cattle.

The property was owned by Richardson, Edgar and Gillam in 1893. Gillam introduced merino rams into the flock in 1899. A cyclone passed through the area later the same year depositing 3 inches (76 mm) of rain at the station and tearing the roof from the old homestead.

Gillam became the sole owner of Chirritta at some time prior to 1905. He sold it in 1907 to the Withnell brothers, who owned the neighbouring Karratha Station. At the time the property supported about 16,000 sheep and shearing that year produced 288 bales of wool.

Cases of leprosy were reported amongst the Aboriginal people who were living at Chirritta in 1912.

The Withnells sold Chirritta in 1920 to Clarence Meares, who paid an estimated £30,000 for the property. The property was stocked with about 22,000 sheep when Meares took possession.

== See also ==
- List of ranches and stations
- List of pastoral leases in Western Australia
