= William McFadden Orr =

British and Irish mathematician (1866–1934)

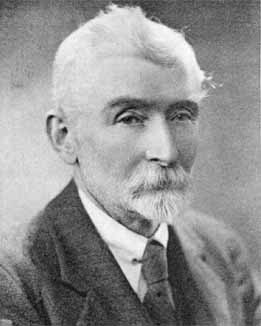

William McFadden Orr, FRS (2 May 1866 – 14 August 1934) was a British and Irish mathematician.

He was born in Comber, County Down and educated at Methodist College Belfast and Queen's College, Belfast under John Purser, before entering St John's College, Cambridge and graduating as Senior Wrangler in 1888. He was elected a fellow of his college, and became a Fellow of the Royal Society in 1909.

He was appointed professor of mathematics at the Royal College of Science for Ireland in 1892 and professor of pure mathematics and applied mathematics when the college merged with University College Dublin in 1926. He retired in 1933 and died in 1934.

Orr–Sommerfeld equation in fluid dynamics is named after his work in 1907.
