= Benjamin Williamson (mathematician) =

Irish mathematician

Benjamin Williamson (1827–1916) was an Irish mathematician who was a Fellow of Trinity College Dublin (TCD) for over 60 years and was Professor of Natural Philosophy there from 1884 to 1890.

== Life and career ==
Williamson was born in Mallow, County Cork, son of the Rev Benjamin Williamson. He attended Kilkenny College. At TCD he was awarded BA (1849) and MA (1855), having become a Fellow in 1852. He was Donegall Lecturer in Mathematics (1876–1884), and then Professor of Natural Philosophy (1884–1890). TCD awarded him a DSc (1891) and Oxford a DCL (1892). He later became vice provost of TCD (1908), and died in Dublin.

His two calculus books were very popular and ran into many editions over the 40 years following their publication.

== Books ==
- 1872 An Elementary Treatise on the Differential Calculus, Containing the Theory of Plane Curves, With Numerous Examples
- 1874 An Elementary Treatise on the Integral Calculus, containing applications to plane curves and surfaces
- 1884 An Elementary Treatise on Dynamics, containing applications to thermodynamics, with numerous examples (co-written with F. A. Tarleton)
- 1894 An Introduction to the Mathematical Theory of Stress and Strain of Elastic Solids
