= Digby Crozier =

Australian politician (1927–2024)

Digby Glen Crozier (16 May 1927 – 26 February 2024) was an Australian politician.

== Biography ==
Digby Crozier was born in England to medical practitioner John Edwin Digby Crozier and Nancy Legoe, who were from Adelaide. Nancy's father was Glen Legoe (1864–1951) of George Wilcox & Co, and Captain John Legoe (c. 1824–1895) was a grandfather. Crozier attended Geelong Grammar School and then Caius College, Cambridge, where he received a Master of Arts.

From 1945 to 1946, Crozier served in the Royal Australian Navy, and afterwards became a grazier near Casterton. On 20 April 1957, he married Mary Jill Salter and they had four children. He was a councillor at Glenelg from 1965 to 1973, serving as president from 1967 to 1968.

In 1973, Crozier was elected to the Victorian Legislative Council as a Liberal member for Western. He was appointed Minister for State Development, Decentralisation and Tourism in 1976, moving to Local Government in 1979 and to Minerals and Energy in 1981. He was also deputy Liberal leader in the upper house from 1978 to 1979. Following the defeat of the Liberal government in 1982, he was the opposition spokesman on minerals and energy. In 1985, he transferred to the Legislative Assembly, winning the seat of Portland. He was Shadow Minister for Police and Emergency Services from 1985 to 1988, after which he retired from politics.

His daughter, Georgie Crozier, has been a Liberal member of the Victorian Legislative Council since 2010, and became Parliamentary Secretary for Health in 2013.

Digby Crozier died on 26 February 2024, at the age of 96.

Victorian Legislative Council
Preceded by Clive Mitchell	Member for Western; 1973–1985; Served alongside: Kenneth Gross; Bruce Chamberlain	Succeeded by Roger Hallam
Victorian Legislative Assembly
Preceded by Don McKellar	Member for Portland; 1985–1988	Succeeded by Denis Napthine
