= Proceedings of the Royal Irish Academy =

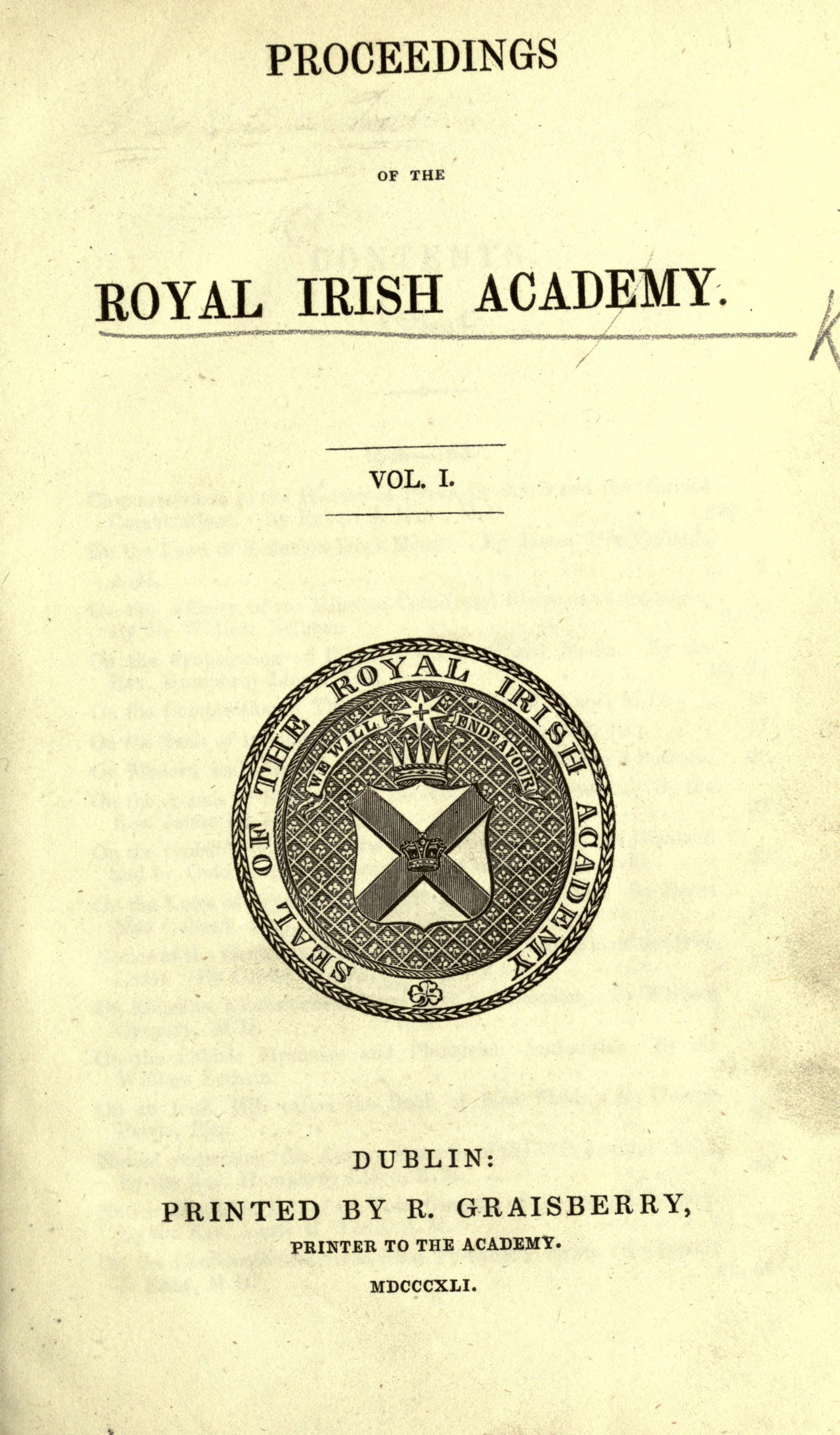
- Discipline: Multidisciplinary
- Language: English

Publication details
- History: 1836–present
- Publisher: Royal Irish Academy (Ireland)

Standard abbreviations
- ISO 4: Proc. R. Ir. Acad.

Biology and Environment
- Language: English
- Edited by: Professor Bruce Osborne

Publication details
- Former names: 1902–1992 – Proceedings of the Royal Irish Society, Section B
- History: 1902–
- Publisher: Royal Irish Academy (Ireland)
- Frequency: Triannual

Standard abbreviations
- ISO 4: Biol. Environ.

Indexing
- ISSN: 0791-7945 (print); 2009-003X (web)
- JSTOR: biolenviprocria

Links
- Journal homepage

Mathematical Proceedings of the Royal Irish Academy
- Discipline: Mathematics
- Language: English
- Edited by: Dr Martin Mathieu, Queen's University Belfast

Publication details
- Former names: Proceedings of the Royal Irish Academy, Section A
- History: 1902–present
- Publisher: Royal Irish Academy (Ireland)
- Frequency: Biannual

Standard abbreviations
- ISO 4: Math. Proc. R. Ir. Acad.

Indexing
- ISSN: 1393-7197 (print); 2009-0021 (web)
- JSTOR: mathprocria

Links
- Journal homepage

Proceedings of the Royal Irish Academy, Section C
- Language: English
- Edited by: Professor James Kelly; Dr Tomás Ó Carragáin

Publication details
- History: 1902–present
- Publisher: Royal Irish Academy (Ireland)
- Frequency: annually

Standard abbreviations
- ISO 4: Proc. R. Ir. Acad. C

Indexing
- ISSN: 0035-8991 (print); 2009-0048 (web)
- JSTOR: procriasectc

Links
- Journal homepage

The Proceedings of the Royal Irish Academy (PRIA) is the journal of the Royal Irish Academy, founded in 1785 to promote the study of science, polite literature, and antiquities. It was known as several titles over the years:

- 1836–1866: Proceedings of the Royal Irish Academy
- 1870–1884: Proceedings of the Royal Irish Academy. Science
- 1879: Proceedings of the Royal Irish Academy. Polite Literature and Antiquities
- 1889–1901: Proceedings of the Royal Irish Academy

In 1902, the journal split into three sections Section A: Mathematical and Physical Sciences, Section B: Biological, Geological, and Chemical Science and Section C: Archaeology, Culture, History, Literature. Section A is now published as Mathematical Proceedings of the Royal Irish Academy since 1998, and Section B is now published as Biology and Environment: Proceedings of the Royal Irish Academy. Section C is now Proceedings of the Royal Irish Academy: Archaeology, Culture, History, Literature.
