= Frederick Purser =

Irish mathematician

- Born: 1839
- Died: 1910 (aged 70–71)

Academic work
- Discipline: Mathematics

Frederick Purser (1839–30 January 1910) was an Irish mathematician, author, and member of the Royal Irish Academy. He was a younger brother to mathematician John Purser.

== Life and career ==
Born in Dublin, Frederick attended a boarding school run by his uncle Richard Biggs in Wiltshire, England, then attended Trinity College Dublin (TCD), where he was Scholar (1859), and got BA (1860) and MA (1864). He was elected a Fellow there in 1879. He was appointed Professor of Natural Philosophy in 1902 and served in the role until his death. He contributed articles to the 1911 Encyclopedia Britannica.
