= 1983 Wannon by-election =

Australian federal by-election

- 7 May 1983
	First party	Second party	Third party
Candidate	David Hawker	Nancy Genardini	Roger Hallam
Party	Liberal	Labor	National
Popular vote	26,631	23,069	14,290
Percentage	41.6%	36.1%	22.3%
Swing	▼16.0	▼1.1	▲22.3
TPP	60.8%	39.2%
TPP swing	▲1.1	▼1.1
MP before election
Malcolm Fraser
Liberal
Elected MP
David Hawker
Liberal

A by-election was held for the Australian House of Representatives seat of Wannon on 7 May 1983. This was triggered by the resignation of Liberal Party MP and former prime minister Malcolm Fraser.

== Results ==
Wannon by-election, 1983
Party	Candidate	Votes	%	±%
Liberal	David Hawker	26,631	41.6	−16.0
Labor	Nancy Genardini	23,069	36.1	−1.1
National	Roger Hallam	14,290	22.3	+22.3
Total formal votes		63,990	99.2	+0.5
Informal votes		527	0.8	−0.5
Turnout		64,517	92.9	−4.1
Two-party-preferred result
Liberal	David Hawker	38,930	60.8	+1.1
Labor	Nancy Genardini	25,060	39.2	−1.1
Liberal hold		Swing	+1.1	

== See also ==
- List of Australian federal by-elections
