= Henry Wrixon =

Australian politician

The Honourable Sir Henry Wrixon KCMG, QC

17th Attorney-General of Victoria
- In office 18 February 1886 – 4 November 1890
- Premier: Duncan Gillies
- Preceded by: George Kerferd
- Succeeded by: William Shiels

Personal details
- Born: Henry John Wrixon; 18 October 1839 Dublin, Ireland, UK
- Died: 9 April 1915 (aged 75) Kew, Victoria, Australia
- Spouse: Charlotte Miller
- Education: Trinity College Dublin
- Profession: Barrister

Sir Henry John Wrixon KCMG QC (18 October 1839 – 9 April 1913) was an Australian barrister and politician.

== Early life ==
Wrixon was born in Dublin, Ireland, to Arthur Nicholas Wrixon and his wife, Charlotte Matilda. He was educated in Portland, Victoria, entered the University of Melbourne in its inaugural year of 1855, and became one of the earliest students to matriculate there. In 1857 he returned to Ireland and entered Trinity College Dublin, graduating with a BA in 1861; the same year was called to the Irish Bar.

He married Charlotte Miller, a daughter of the Hon. Henry Miller MLC, a member of the original unicameral Victorian Legislative Council and banker, who left an extensive estate on his death in 1888. By February 1889, Wrixon and his wife owned Raheen, an Italianate mansion in Kew.

== Career ==
Victorian Legislative Assembly
Preceded by Gordon Evans	Member for Belfast; 1868–1877	Succeeded by Sir John O'Shanassy
Preceded by Thomas Cope	Member for Portland; 1880–1894	Succeeded by Donald Norman McLeod
Victorian Legislative Council
Preceded by Joseph Grey	Member for South-Western Province; 1896–1910; With: Joseph Connor 1896–1899; Thomas Harwood 1899–1910; Sidney Austin 1896–1904	Succeeded by Austin Austin
Political offices
Preceded by Cole Aspinall	Solicitor-General of Victoria; April 1870 - June 1871	Succeeded by Howard Spensley
Preceded by George Kerferd	Attorney-General of Victoria; 1886–1890	Succeeded by William Shiels
Preceded by Sir William Zeal	President of the Victorian Legislative Council; 1901–1910	Succeeded by John Mark Davies
Academic offices
Preceded by Sir John Madden	Vice-Chancellor of the University of Melbourne; 1897–1910	Succeeded by Sir John MacFarland
