= Francis Alexander Tarleton =

Irish mathematician

, Francis Alexander Tarleton (1841–1920) was an Irish mathematician and author who was Professor of Natural Philosophy at Trinity College Dublin (TCD) from 1890 to 1902. A published academic author, he held multiple senior roles at Trinity, qualified as a barrister, and was president of the Royal Irish Academy.

== Life and career ==
Tarleton was born in county Monaghan, Ireland and was educated at TCD (Scholar 1860, BA 1861, MA 1865) where he spent his entire career. While at TCD he served as bursar, senior dean, and vice provost, and was awarded an honorary ScD in 1891.

Tarleton wrote several books on dynamics and the mathematical theory of attraction. He was active in the posing and solving of mathematical problems in the Educational Times.

He was called to the bar in 1868, and served as president of the Royal Irish Academy from 1906 to 1911.

== Books ==
- 1884: An Elementary Treatise on Dynamics, containing applications to thermodynamics, with numerous examples written with Benjamin Williamson, (Longmans, Green, and Co.)
- 1899: An Introduction to the Mathematical Theory of Attraction, Vol. I (Longmans, Green, and Co.)
- 1913: An Introduction to the Mathematical Theory of Attraction, Vol. II (Longmans, Green, and Co.)
