= John Henry MacFarland =

Irish-Australian chancellor of Melbourne University

Sir John Henry MacFarland
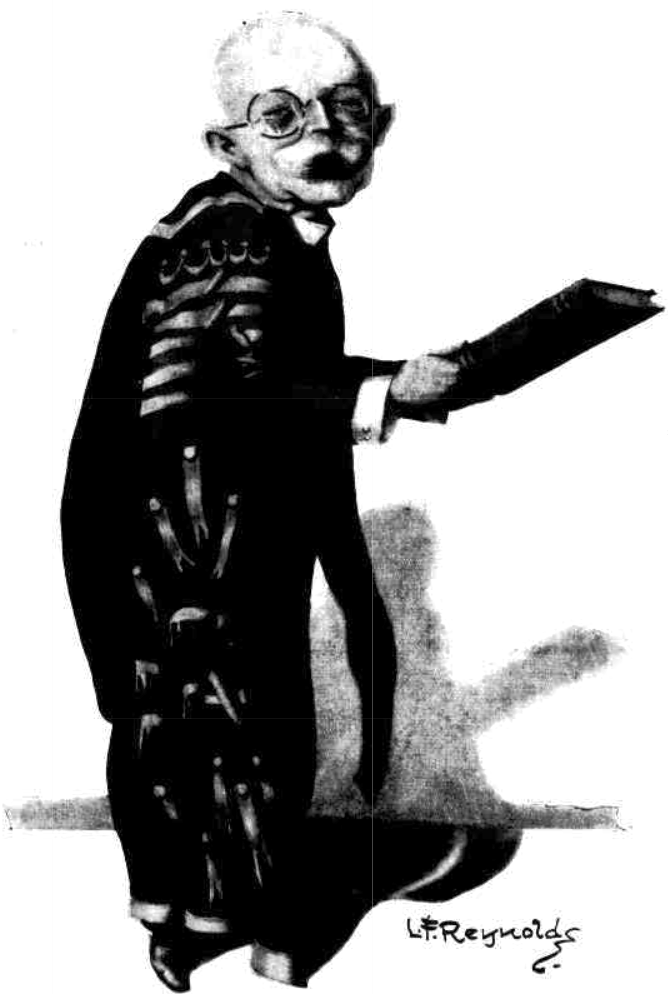
- 1927 caricature by Reynolds
- Born: 19 April 1851; Omagh, County Tyrone, Ireland
- Died: 22 July 1935 (aged 84); Melbourne, Victoria, Australia
- Education: Queen's College, Belfast (BA, MA); St John's College, Cambridge (MA)
- Scientific career
- Fields: Mathematics
- Workplaces: Ormond College; University of Melbourne

Sir John Henry MacFarland (19 April 1851 – 22 July 1935) was an Irish–Australian university chancellor. MacFarland was born in Omagh, County Tyrone, Ireland, and educated at the Royal Academical Institution, Belfast. He was senior scholar in Mathematics and Natural Philosophy at Queen's College, Belfast, where he was taught by John Purser. There he earned a BA in 1871 and MA in 1872. Moving to St. John's College, Cambridge, he was elected a foundation scholar, and earned a second BA, as 26th wrangler, in 1876. He also obtained an MA there in 1879.

MacFarland taught at Repton School in Derbyshire from 1876 to 1880. (A decade later, his younger brother Robert (1860–1922), also a Queen's Belfast and Cambridge maths graduate, would teach at Repton.) In 1881, he became the first master of Ormond College in the University of Melbourne. In 1919, he became chancellor of the university and was knighted the same year. In 1892, the Royal University of Ireland had bestowed upon him an honorary LLD degree.

MacFarland became a director of the National Mutual Life Association c. 1905 and was chairman from 1928. He died in Melbourne, Victoria, Australia on 22 July 1935. MacFarland Court at the University is named in his honour.

Academic offices
Preceded by Sir Henry Wrixon	Vice-Chancellor of the University of Melbourne; 1910 – 1918	Succeeded by Sir John Grice
Preceded by Sir John Madden	Chancellor of the University of Melbourne; 1918 – 1935	Succeeded by Sir James Barrett
