= Kenneth Gross (politician) =

Australian politician

Kenneth Samuel Gross (4 November 1924 – 2 October 1989) was an Australian politician.

Gross was born in Horsham to farmer Samuel Gross and Paulina Helena Stoessel. He attended state schools locally and became a farmer near Horsham in 1942. On 19 April 1952 he married Heather Brenton, with whom he had three children. A long-time member of the Liberal and Country Party, he was elected to the Victorian Legislative Council in 1958 for Western Province. He served in the council until his retirement in 1976. Gross died in Horsham in 1989.

Victorian Legislative Council
Preceded by David Arnott	Member for Western; 1958–1976; Served alongside: Ronald Mack; Clive Mitchell; Digby Crozier	Succeeded by Bruce Chamberlain
