= John Grice =

Vice-Chancellor of the University of Melbourne (1850–1935)

Sir John Grice (6 October 1850 – 27 February 1935) was an Australian businessman, company director and University of Melbourne vice-chancellor.

== Biography ==
Grice was born in Selly Oak, fourth son of Richard Grice, a Selly Oak merchant. He studied at Aston University 1861–66 and the just-opened Wesley College, Melbourne (where he was the first boy to matriculate and qualify for the University of Melbourne). Grice graduated LL.B. in 1871, and BA in 1872.

Academic offices
| Preceded by Sir John MacFarland | Vice-Chancellor of the University of Melbourne; 1918–1923 | Succeeded by General Sir John Monash |
