= Matthew Wyatt Joseph Fry =

Irish mathematician (1863–1943)

- Born: 1863; County Clare, Ireland
- Died: 2 December 1943 (aged 79–80); Dublin, Ireland
- Occupation: Professor of Natural Philosophy at Trinity College Dublin

Academic background
- Education: Trinity College Dublin

Academic work
- Discipline: Mathematics
- Institutions: Trinity College Dublin

Matthew Wyatt Joseph Fry (1863 – 2 December 1943) was an Irish mathematician and academic who served as Professor of Natural Philosophy at Trinity College Dublin (TCD) from 1910 to 1925.

== Life and career ==
Fry was born in County Clare, where his father was Rev Henry Fry of Kilkeedy parish (diocese of Killaloe), the family later moving to Bourney parish, Corbally, Roscrea, Co Tipperary. Matthew attended Galway Grammar school, and then TCD, studying mathematics. He was awarded BA (1885), and MA and Fellowship (1889), being appointed Assistant to the Professor of Natural Philosophy that same year. In 1910 he became the Erasmus Smith's Professor of Natural and Experimental Philosophy. He was also Junior Dean (1893–1897), representative of the Junior Fellows on the Board (1911–1917) and became Senior Proctor in 1918. He retired in 1925 and died in Dublin in 1943.
