= Digital Humanities Observatory =

- Address: 30 Upper Pembroke Street, Dublin 2.
- Location: Dublin, Ireland
- Website: dho.ie

The Digital Humanities Observatory (DHO) was a research project of the Royal Irish Academy and part of the Humanities Serving Irish Society (HSIS) initiative. It provided expertise and knowledge to digital research projects in the arts and humanities in Ireland. Through activities such as a DHO Summer School, practice-based workshops, seminars, symposia and consultations the DHO helped researchers in Ireland be aware of and stay current with developments in the creation, use, and preservation of digital resources. The DHO developed DRAPIer, a database of digital research projects in Ireland and DHO:Discovery, a portal to collections of Irish cultural artefacts.

== Description ==
The DHO operated summer and spring schools, and week-long workshops for scholars undertaking digital projects. It operated from 2008 through August 30, 2013. The Royal Irish Academy was awarded a three-year grant of about €3.5 million in late 2007 for Humanities Serving Irish Society. The first DHO first director was Susan Schreibman from the University of Maryland. In 2011 Schreibman joined the faculty of Trinity College Dublin.

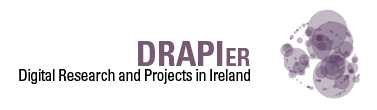
DRAPIer logo

=== DRAPIer ===
DRAPIer (backronym to Digital Research and Projects in Ireland) was an interactive database of digital humanities projects created by third level institutions on the island of Ireland. DRAPIer was named after Drapier's Letters - a series of seven pamphlets written between 1724 and 1725 by Dean Jonathan Swift of St Patrick's Cathedral, Dublin. The text used in creating the logo was taken from Drapier's Letters. The visualisation was created using a simple text analysis routine written within Processing, an open source programming environment. Each purple circle represents one unique word within the text. The circle's radius is directly proportional to the number of occurrences of the word within the text. Each circle has the same base colour but it is semi-transparent, so that when one is plotted on top of another it appears to be darker, representing overlapping networks from human to digital.

=== DHO:Discovery ===
In 2011 the DHO opened a Web site called DHO:Discovery, a gateway to Irish digital collections and resources, information and knowledge. It aimed to increase the visibility of resources at HSIS partner institutions and national cultural bodies, allowing users to easily browse and create connections between a variety of digital collections. Using display tools such as Exhibit and Google Charts, statistical data and visualisations not present on the collections' own sites are made available to the academic community.

== See also ==
- Royal Irish Academy
- Digital Humanities
- Humanistic informatics
