= Western Province (Victoria) =

Former electoral province of the Victorian Legislative Council, Australia

Coordinates: 38°0′S 142°30′E

Western Province Victoria—Legislative Council
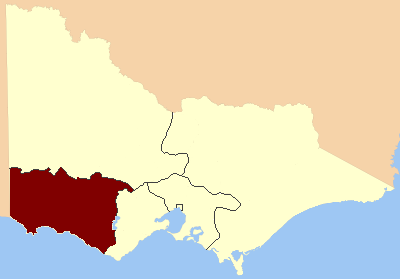
- Western Province, 1856
- State: Victoria
- Created: 1856
- Abolished: 2006
- Demographic: Rural

Western Province was an electorate of the Victorian Legislative Council (Australia), the upper house of the Parliament of Victoria. Victoria was a colony in Australia when Western Province was created. From Federation in 1901, Victoria was a state in the Commonwealth of Australia.

Western Province was one of the six original upper house provinces of the bicameral Victorian Parliament created in November 1856.

Western Province was defined in the Victorian Constitution Act, 1855, as : "Including the Counties of Ripon, Hampden, Heytesbury, Villiers, Normanby, Dundas, and Follett."

In 1882, several new Provinces were created, including Nelson Province and Wellington Province, the numbers of members elected for Western Province was reduced to three from this time. Another redistribution in 1904 reduced the number of members to two.

In 2006, the Western Province (along with all the other provinces in the Legislative Council) was abolished and replaced by regions. All of the area covered by Western Province is contained in the larger Western Victoria Region.

== Members for Western Province ==
Five members initially until 1882. Three from 1882 until 1904, then two members from 1904 until abolition in 2006.

Member 1	Party	Year	Member 2	Party	Member 3	Party	Member 4	Party	Member 5	Party
Stephen Henty		1856	Charles Vaughan		James Palmer		Andrew Cruikshank		Daniel Tierney	
Stephen Henty		1858	Charles Vaughan		James Palmer		Henry Miller		Daniel Tierney	
Stephen Henty		1858	Charles Vaughan		James Palmer		Henry Miller		Daniel Tierney	
Stephen Henty		1859	Charles Vaughan		James Palmer		Henry Miller		Niel Black	
Stephen Henty		1860	Charles Vaughan		James Palmer		Henry Miller		Niel Black	
Stephen Henty		1862	Charles Vaughan		James Palmer		Henry Miller		Niel Black	
Stephen Henty		1864	Charles Sladen		James Palmer		Henry Miller		Niel Black	
Stephen Henty		1864	Charles Sladen		James Palmer		Henry Miller		Niel Black	
Stephen Henty		1866	Charles Sladen		James Palmer		James Strachan		Niel Black	
Stephen Henty		1866	Charles Sladen		James Palmer		James Strachan		Niel Black	
Stephen Henty		1868	Robert Simson		James Palmer		James Strachan		Niel Black	
Stephen Henty		1870	Robert Simson		Thomas McKellar		James Strachan		Niel Black	
William Skene		1870	Robert Simson		Thomas McKellar		James Strachan		Niel Black	
William Skene		1872	Robert Simson		Thomas McKellar		James Strachan		Niel Black	
William Skene		1874	Robert Simson		Thomas McKellar		Thomas Bromell		Niel Black	
William Skene		1875	Robert Simson		Samuel Wilson		Thomas Bromell		Niel Black	
Charles Sladen		1876	Robert Simson		Samuel Wilson		Thomas Bromell		Niel Black	
Charles Sladen		1878	William Ross		Samuel Wilson		Thomas Bromell		Niel Black	
Charles Sladen		1880	William Ross		Samuel Wilson		Thomas Bromell		Robert Simson	
Charles Sladen		1880	William Ross		Samuel Wilson		Thomas Bromell		Robert Simson	
Charles Sladen		1881	William Ross		Thomas Cumming		Thomas Bromell		Robert Simson	
Nathan Thornley		1882	William Ross		Thomas Cumming					
Nathan Thornley		1884	William Ross		Thomas Cumming					
Nathan Thornley		1886	William Ross		Thomas Cumming					
Nathan Thornley		1888	Samuel Cooke		Thomas Cumming					
Nathan Thornley		1888	Samuel Cooke		Agar Wynne					
Nathan Thornley		1890	Samuel Cooke		Agar Wynne					
Nathan Thornley		1892	Samuel Cooke		Agar Wynne					
Nathan Thornley		1894	Samuel Cooke		Agar Wynne					
Nathan Thornley		1896	Samuel Cooke		Agar Wynne					
Nathan Thornley		1898	Samuel Cooke		Agar Wynne					
Nathan Thornley		1900	Samuel Cooke		Agar Wynne					
Nathan Thornley		1901	Walter Manifold		Agar Wynne					
Nathan Thornley		1902	Walter Manifold		Agar Wynne					
Robert Ritchie		1903	Walter Manifold		Agar Wynne					
Robert Ritchie		1903	Walter Manifold		Alexander MacLeod					
Robert Ritchie		1904	Walter Manifold							
Edward White		1907	Walter Manifold							
Edward White		1910	Walter Manifold							
Edward White		1913	Walter Manifold							
Edward White		1916	Walter Manifold							
Edward White	Nationalist	1917	Walter Manifold	Nationalist						
Edward White	Nationalist	1919	Walter Manifold	Nationalist						
Edward White	Nationalist	1922	Walter Manifold	Nationalist						
Edward White	Nationalist	1924	Marcus Saltau	Nationalist						
Edward White	Nationalist	1925	Marcus Saltau	Nationalist						
Edward White	Nationalist	1928	Marcus Saltau	Nationalist						
William Williamson	Independent	1931	Marcus Saltau	Nationalist						
William Williamson	Independent	1931	Marcus Saltau	United Australia						
William Williamson	Independent	1934	Marcus Saltau	United Australia						
Leonard Rodda^{[r]}	Country	1937	Marcus Saltau	United Australia						
Leonard Rodda^{[r]}	Country	1940	Robert Rankin	Country						
Leonard Rodda^{[r]}	Country	1943	Robert Rankin	Country						
Leonard Rodda	Country	1943	Robert Rankin	Country						
Leonard Rodda	Country	1945	Robert Rankin	Country						
Leonard Rodda	Country	1946	Robert Rankin	Country						
Hugh MacLeod	Independent	1946	Robert Rankin	Country						
Hugh MacLeod	Liberal and Country	1949	Robert Rankin	Liberal and Country						
Hugh MacLeod	Liberal and Country	1949	Robert Rankin	Liberal and Country						
Hugh MacLeod	Electoral Reform	1952	Robert Rankin	Liberal and Country						
Hugh MacLeod	Electoral Reform	1952	David Arnott	Labor						
Ronald Mack	Liberal and Country	1955	David Arnott	Labor						
Ronald Mack	Liberal and Country	1958	Kenneth Gross	Liberal and Country						
Ronald Mack	Liberal and Country	1961	Kenneth Gross	Liberal and Country						
Ronald Mack	Liberal and Country	1964	Kenneth Gross	Liberal and Country						
Ronald Mack	Liberal	1965	Kenneth Gross	Liberal						
Ronald Mack	Liberal	1967	Kenneth Gross	Liberal						
Clive Mitchell	Country	1968	Kenneth Gross	Liberal						
Clive Mitchell	Country	1970	Kenneth Gross	Liberal						
Digby Crozier	Liberal	1973	Kenneth Gross	Liberal						
Digby Crozier	Liberal	1976	Bruce Chamberlain	Liberal						
Digby Crozier	Liberal	1979	Bruce Chamberlain	Liberal						
Digby Crozier	Liberal	1982	Bruce Chamberlain	Liberal						
Roger Hallam	National	1985	Bruce Chamberlain	Liberal						
Roger Hallam	National	1988	Bruce Chamberlain	Liberal						
Roger Hallam	National	1992	Bruce Chamberlain	Liberal						
Roger Hallam	National	1996	Bruce Chamberlain	Liberal						
Roger Hallam	National	1999	Bruce Chamberlain	Liberal						
David Koch	Liberal	2002	John Vogels	Liberal						

^{[r]} Rodda resigned in July 1943, re-elected in October 1943

== Election results ==
2002 Victorian state election: Western Province
Party	Candidate	Votes	%	±%
Liberal	John Vogels	56,497	40.0	+32.5
Labor	Lesley Jackson	54,815	38.8	+0.8
National	Greg Walcott	20,142	14.3	−34.9
Greens	Viola Spokes	9,823	7.0	+7.0
Total formal votes		141,277	96.8	−0.8
Informal votes		4,611	3.2	+0.8
Turnout		145,888	94.9	
Two-party-preferred result
Liberal	John Vogels	76,772	54.3	−4.7
Labor	Lesley Jackson	64,505	45.7	+4.7
Liberal hold		Swing	−4.7	
