= James Hamilton (physicist) =

Irish mathematician and theoretical physicist

James "Jim" Hamilton (29 January 1918 – 6 July 2000) was an Irish mathematician and theoretical physicist who, whilst at Dublin Institute for Advanced Sciences (1941-1943), helped to develop the theory of cosmic-ray mesons with Walter Heitler and Hwan-Wu Peng.

He was born in Sligo. His family moved to Belfast in 1920, where after attending the Royal Academical Institution he entered Queen's University in 1935. Following his graduation, Hamilton continued to work at Queen's, and was the first fellow to be enrolled in the School of Theoretical Physics at the Dublin Institute for Advanced Studies.

After service with the British Admiralty during the Second World War, Hamilton resumed his physics research at the University of Manchester (1945-1949), under Patrick Blackett, where he worked on radiation damping and associated topics.

At the University of Cambridge, where he lectured in mathematics (1950–1960), he was at the forefront of work on S-matrix theory and became known for his sophisticated use of dispersion relations. His work there included collaborations with Abdus Salam and Hans Bethe. During his last two years he was at the core, along with Richard Eden and George Batchelor, of founding the new Department of Applied Mathematics and Theoretical Physics.

At University College, London (1960-1964) he formed a thriving high energy physics research group, before moving to Copenhagen and NORDITA, where he led the teaching of particle physics in Scandinavia from 1964 to 1983.
