= Don McKellar (politician) =

Australian politician (1924–1986)

Donald Kelso McKellar (29 June 1924 – 5 January 1986) was an Australian politician.

He was born at Hamilton to grazier Lionel Jack Stuart McKellar and Colina Martha. He attended school locally and served in the Royal Australian Air Force from 1942 to 1946, returning to farm at Yulecart near Hamilton. On 4 May 1949 he married Margaret Grant, with whom he had five daughters. A Dundas Shire councillor from 1962 to 1967, he was elected to the Victorian Legislative Assembly in 1967 as the Liberal member for Portland. Defeated in 1970, he was elected again in 1973, serving until 1985.

Victorian Legislative Assembly
Preceded by George Gibbs	Member for Portland; 1967–1970	Succeeded by Bill Lewis
Preceded by Bill Lewis	Member for Portland; 1973–1985	Succeeded by Digby Crozier
