= Royal Irish Academy =

All-Ireland academy of sciences and humanities

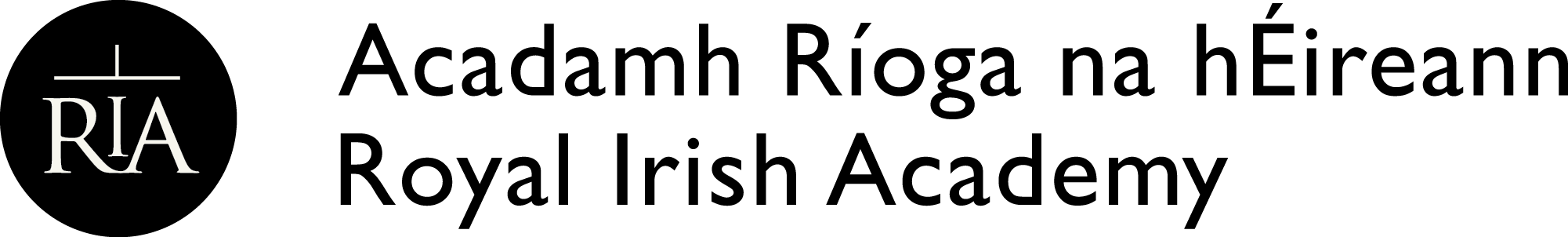

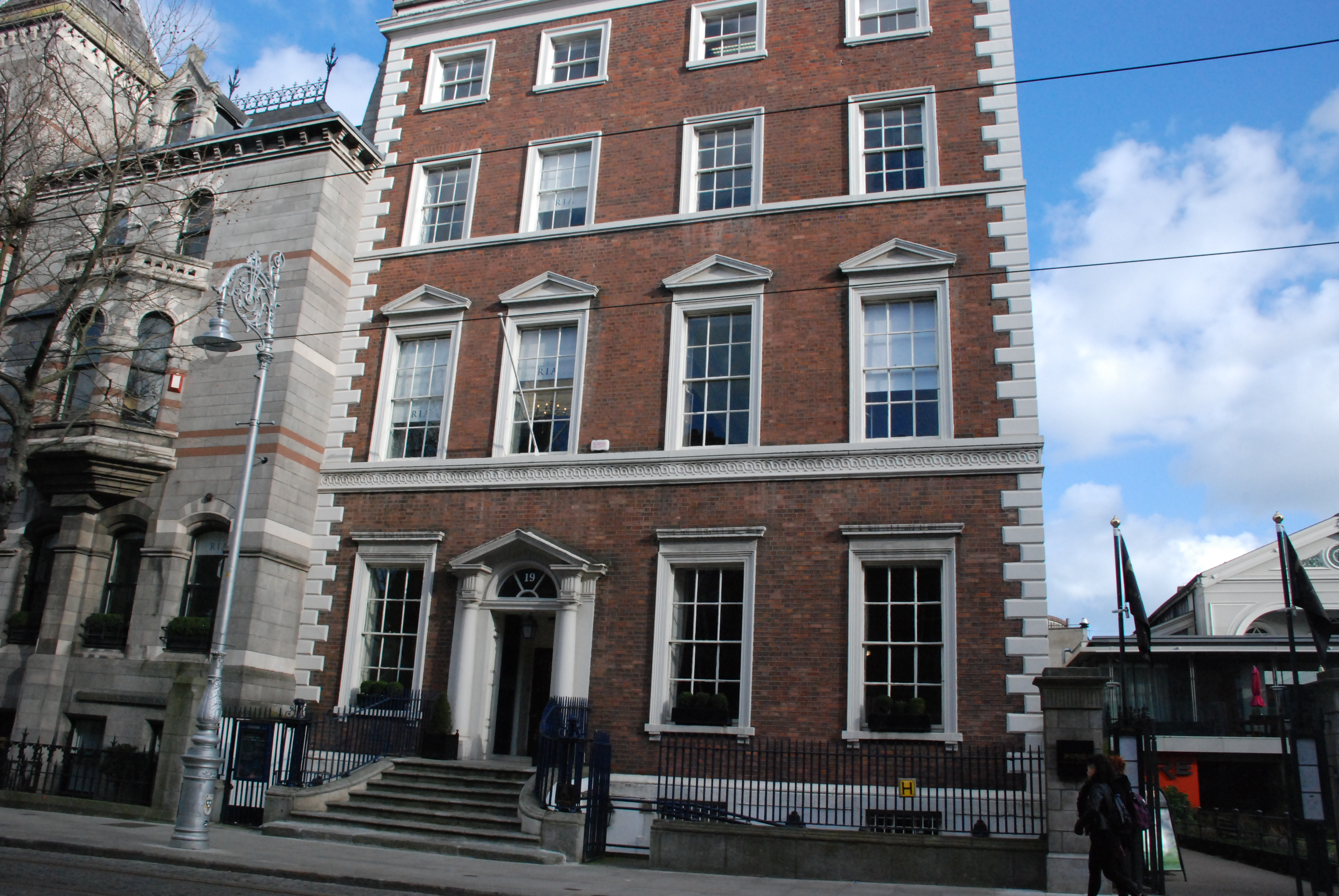
- Formation: 1785; 241 years ago
- Founder: James Caulfeild, 1st Earl of Charlemont
- Headquarters: 19 Dawson Street, Dublin 2, D02 HH58, Dublin, Ireland
- President: Daniel Carey
- Website: www.ria.ie

The Royal Irish Academy (RIA; Irish: Acadamh Ríoga na hÉireann), based in Dublin, is an academic body that promotes study in the natural sciences, arts, literature, and social sciences. It is Ireland's premier learned society and one of its leading cultural and academic institutions. The academy was established in 1785 and granted a royal charter by King George III in 1786. As of 2026, the RIA has over 700 members, with regular members being Irish residents elected in recognition of their academic achievements, and honorary members similarly qualified but usually based abroad; a small number of members are also elected in recognition of non-academic contributions to the Irish society. All members are entitled to use the honorific title MRIA with their names.

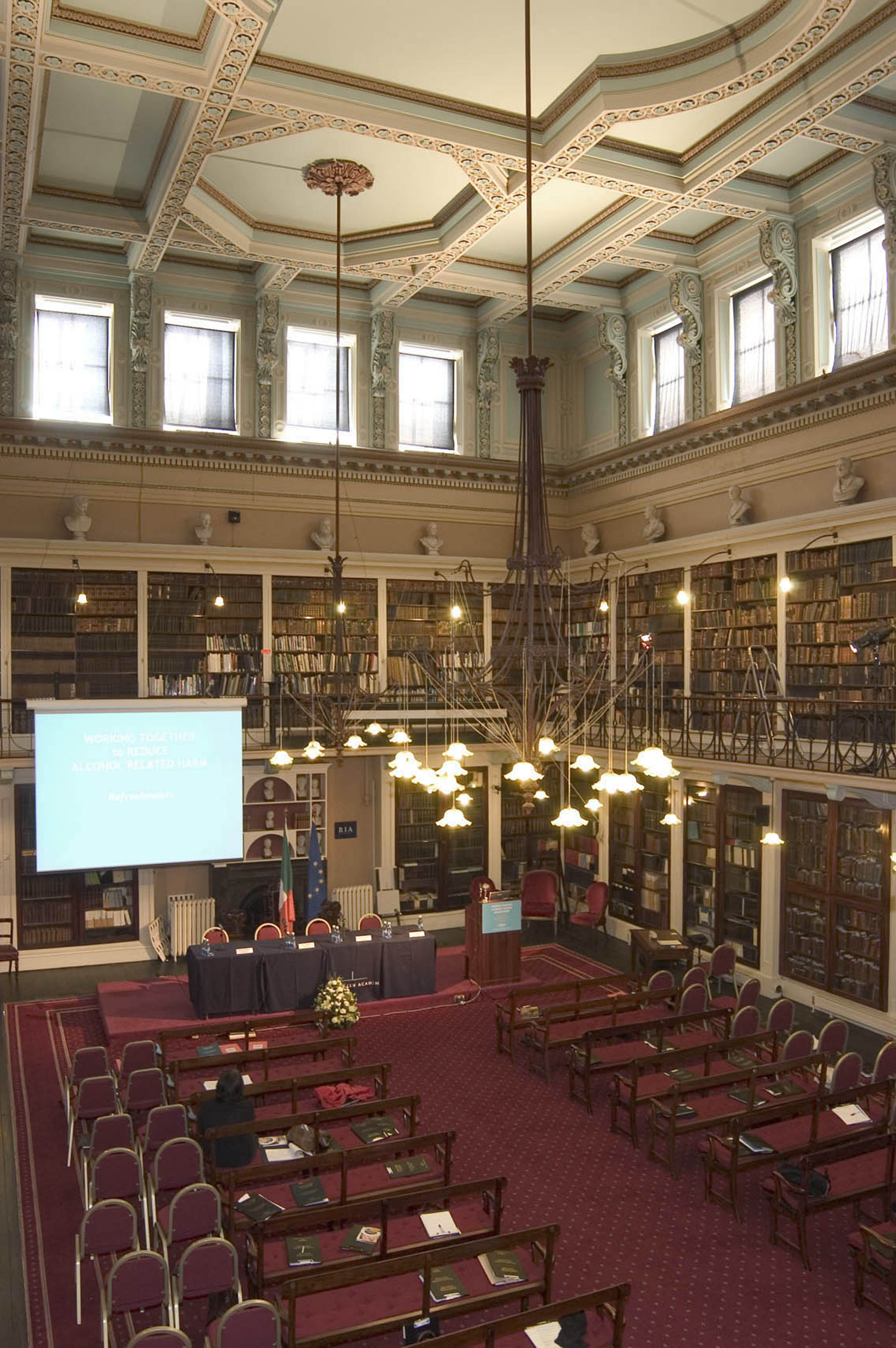
Meeting Room in Academy House

Until the late 19th century the Royal Irish Academy was the owner of the main national collection of Irish antiquities. It presented its collection of archaeological artefacts and similar items, which included such famous pieces as the Tara Brooch, the Cross of Cong and the Ardagh Chalice to what is now the National Museum of Ireland, but retains its very significant collection of manuscripts including the famous Cathach of Colmcille, the Lebor na hUidre (c. 1100), the later medieval Leabhar Breac, the Book of Ballymote, and the Annals of the Four Masters.

== Work ==
The RIA is an independent forum of peer-elected experts, operating on an all-Ireland basis, which draws on members' expertise to contribute to public debate and policy formation on issues in science, technology, social sciences and culture. It works across the academic world, and with government and business, and it leads national research projects, particularly in areas relating to Ireland and its heritage. The RIA also represents Irish learning internationally, operates a major research library, and is an academic publisher.

== Membership ==
The academy has three classes of membership, two for academics, regular and honorary, along with Council-recommended memberships. Up to 28 new members may be elected annually. Members assist the academy in its work by providing expert advice for its Council and committees, by representing the academy nationally and internationally, and by promoting the academy's strategic mission. The academy uses members' expertise to contribute to public debate and policy formation on issues in science and technology, the social sciences and culture.

=== Regular membership ===
Election to regular membership is a public recognition of academic excellence and is sometimes held to be the highest academic honour in Ireland. Those elected are entitled to use the designation "MRIA" after their name. The criterion for election to membership is a significant contribution to scholarly research as shown in the candidate's published academic work.

To be elected to regular membership, a candidate has to be proposed and recommended by five members, and selection is made by a rotating committee of existing members, their names not made known outside the academy. Presently, up to 20 regular members are elected each year, equally divided between the sciences and humanities. Regular membership is open only to those resident in Ireland.

=== Honorary membership ===
Honorary membership can be awarded to persons who have made an outstanding contribution to their academic discipline, but who are normally resident outside the island of Ireland. At least two existing members must propose and recommend a candidate for honorary membership. Honorary members are entitled to use the designation "Hon. MRIA" after their name.

=== Council-recommended membership ===
Some of those elected to membership are not elected as academics but receive the accolade in recognition of other contributions to society: these include former public servants, philanthropists, leaders in political and business life, and others. Each year the Council may recommend a small number of such memberships.

== Publishing ==
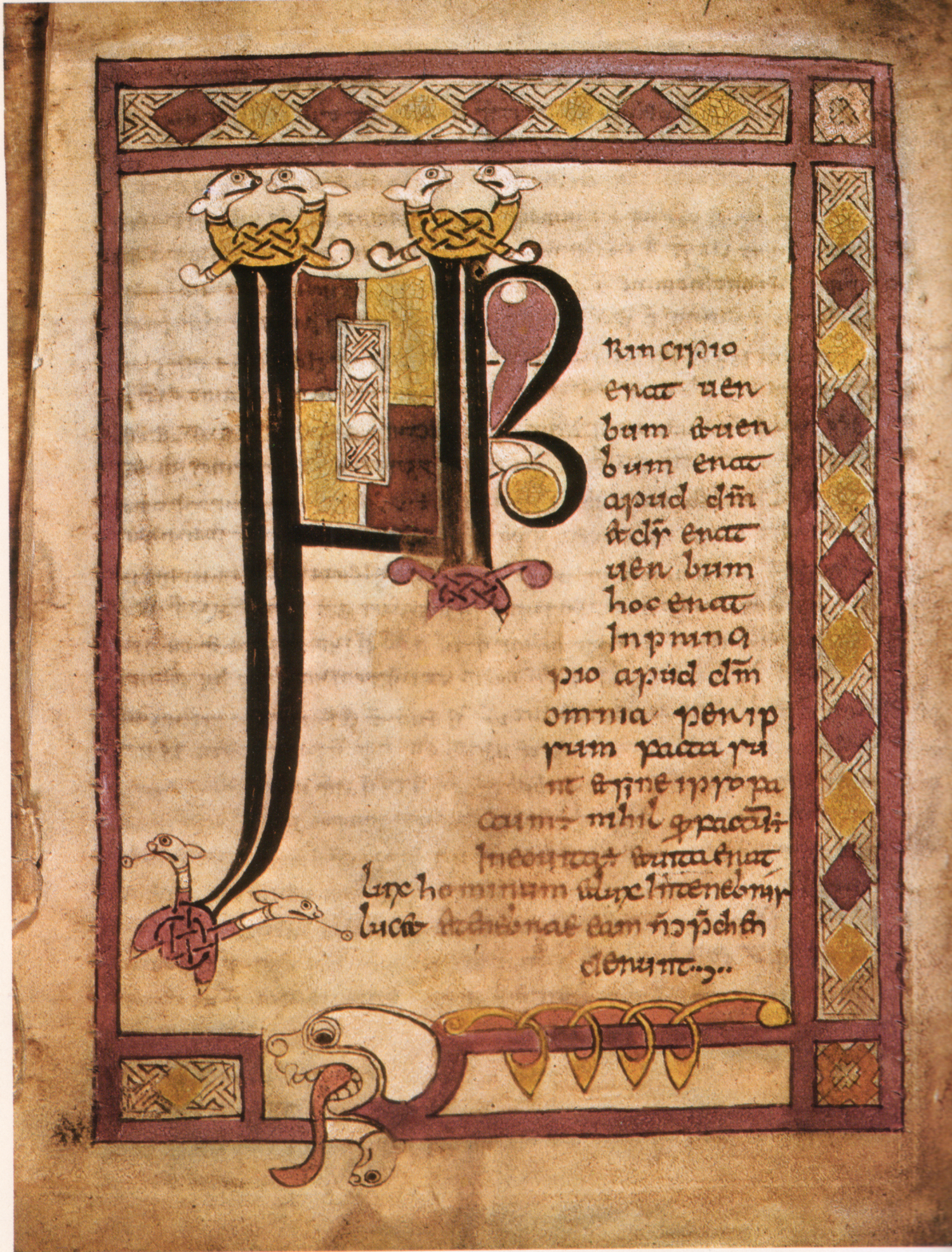
Initial page from the 9th-century Stowe Missal

The academy is one of the longest-established publishers in Ireland, having commenced in 1787. The academy currently publishes six journals:

- Ériu
- Irish Studies in International Affairs
- Irish Journal of Earth Sciences
- Mathematical Proceedings of the Royal Irish Academy
- Proceedings of the Royal Irish Academy: Archaeology, Culture, History, Literature
- Biology and Environment

The academy's research projects also regularly publish the Irish Historic Towns Atlas series, the Documents on Irish Foreign Policy, Foclóir na nua-Ghaeilge, the Dictionary of Medieval Latin from Celtic Sources, and the New Survey of Clare Island. In 2014 the academy published (in association with Yale University Press) the five-volume Art and Architecture of Ireland.

The academy is committed to publishing work which not only influences scholarship, but also the wider community, for example Flashes of Brilliance by Dick Ahlstrom, and Judging Dev by Diarmaid Ferriter. Both of these publications have been accompanied by either a television or a radio series.

== Research projects ==
The academy manages a number of high-profile research projects in the sciences and humanities. Past projects have included The Digital Humanities Observatory (DHO), New Survey of Clare Island (NSCI) and, The Origins of the Irish Constitution (OIC).

Other projects include:

- Dictionary of Medieval Latin from Celtic Sources (DMLCS)
- Documents on Irish Foreign Policy (DIFP)
- Foclóir na nua-Ghaeilge (Dictionary of Modern Irish) Online Historical Irish Corpus 1600–1926
- Irish Historic Towns Atlas (IHTA)
- Digital Repository of Ireland (DRI)
- Analysing and Researching Ireland North and South (ARINS)
- Grangegorman Histories
- Dictionary of Irish Biography (DIB)

== Academy committees ==
During the 1950s the academy began forming national committees, each relating to a specific discipline. Today these act as strategic national fora, providing input into policy, research priorities and issues of public concern, such as climate change. They also organise public outreach activities, such as lectures and public interviews, and award grants for research and travel.

The academy committees are made up of both members and non-members, including representatives from universities, research institutions, government agencies and, where appropriate, industry. The ten disciplinary committees are equally split into two sectors, five in sciences and five in humanities and social sciences, these committees include:

Science Committees

- Life and medical sciences
- Physical, chemical and mathematical sciences
- Climate change and environmental sciences
- Engineering and computer sciences
- Geosciences and geographical sciences

Humanities Committees

- Ethical, political, legal and philosophical studies
- Historical studies
- Social sciences
- Study of languages, literature, culture and communication
- Coiste Léann na Gaeilge, Litríocht na Gaeilge agus na gCultúr Ceilteach.

There are also standing committees for archaeology, international affairs and north–south matters.

== Headquarters ==
The first meeting of the academy were held at the Earl of Charlemont's personal residence Charlemont House.

=== Navigation House ===
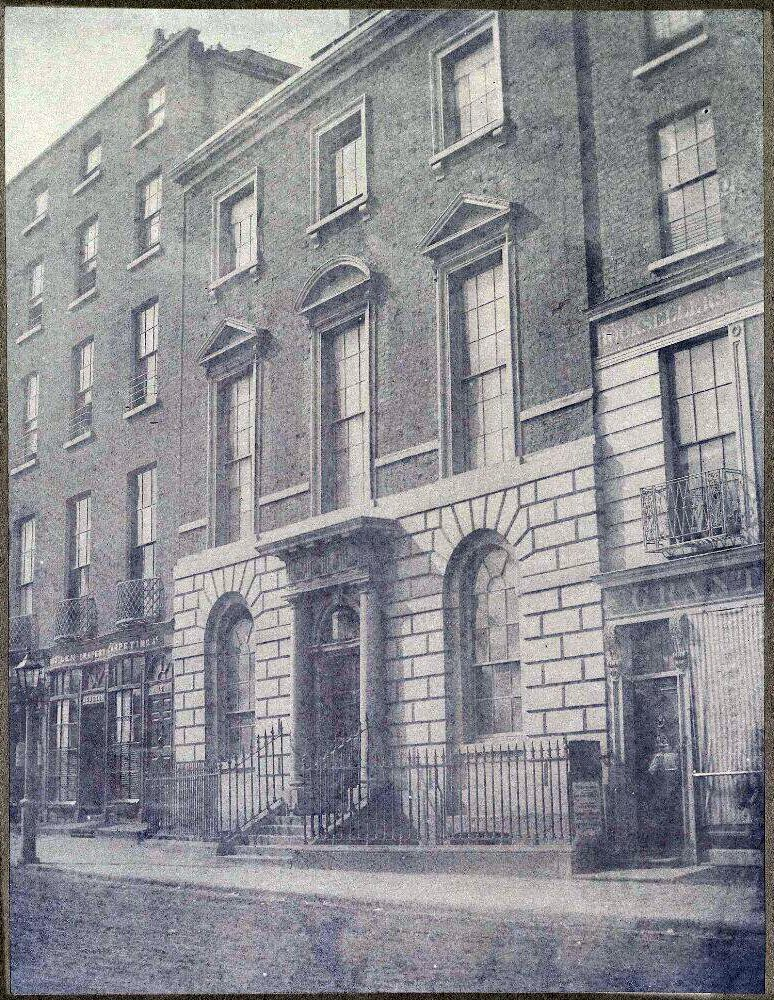
Navigation House, Grafton Street

On application to the Commissioners of Inland Navigation, the academy was then granted the use of a building at 114 Grafton Street named Navigation House around 1787, previously used by the Grand Canal Company. The building had originally been constructed in 1766 as the dedicated offices of the Commissioners of Inland Navigation alongside the then headquarters of the Dublin Society which they eventually sold on in 1796.

The academy had already been using the building for meetings from 1785.

=== Academy House ===
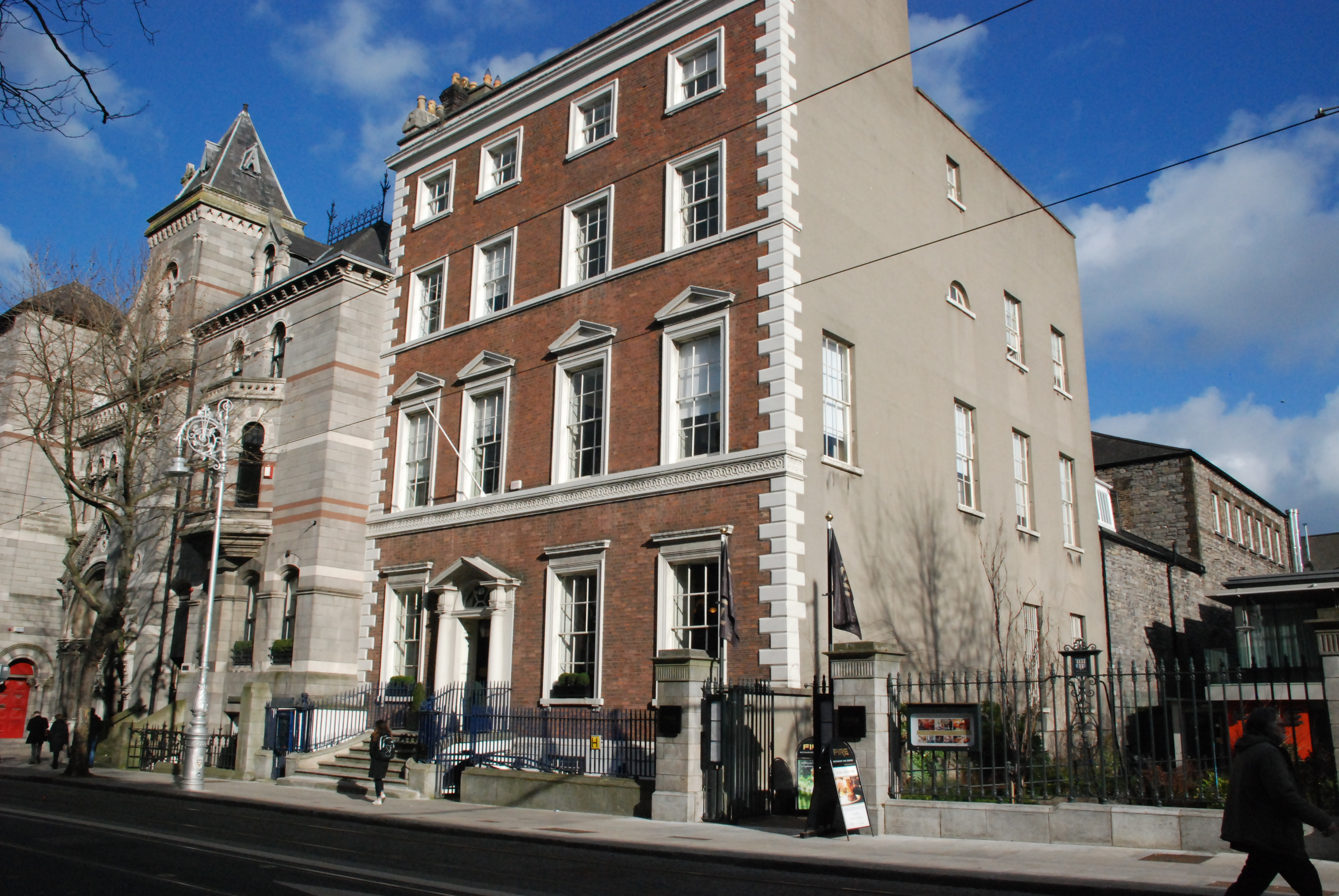
Academy House

In 1852 the Royal Irish Academy moved to its current premises at 19 Dawson Street, Dublin 2, known as Academy House.

Built in c. 1750, the building has fine decorative plasterwork and a meeting room designed in 1854 by Frederick Clarendon and now used for conferences, exhibitions and public talks. The academy allows the use of these meeting rooms by external bodies when its own activities permit.

Academy House was home to many of Ireland's finest national treasures, including the Ardagh Chalice and the Tara Brooch, until 1890 when the academy transferred its collections to the newly established National Museum of Ireland.

In February 1908, The Georgian Society had its inaugural meeting at Academy House which was also to go on to become its de facto headquarters.

=== Library ===
The Academy Library holds the largest collection of Old Irish manuscripts in the world, and is an important research centre for studies covering Irish history, language, archaeology and the history of Irish science. The Library is home to the sixth-century Latin psalter, the Cathach, reputedly copied by St Columcille. The Library also holds the personal library and a harp belonging to Thomas Moore and the philological collection of Osborn J. Bergin.

See also Category:Royal Irish Academy Library

== Governance ==
The president and council are responsible for the academy's general government and regulation. They are elected annually at the stated meeting on 16 March. The president normally serves a three-year term of office. The membership of the council is drawn from the Sciences and Humanities sections. The council formulates policies and recommends candidates for membership.

The executive committee supports the council in supervising the day-to-day business of the academy. The members of the executive committee are the president, senior vice-president, secretary, treasurer, secretaries of science and PL&A (polite literature & antiquities, i.e. humanities), executive secretary, secretary for international relations, and a staff representative.

The Royal Irish Academy became a prescribed body under the terms of the Freedom of Information Act 1997 and the Freedom of Information Act (Amendment) 2003, on 31 May 2006.

=== Presidents ===
- 1785–1799: James Caulfeild, 1st Earl of Charlemont (1st president)
- 1799–1812: Richard Kirwan
- 1812–1822: Charles Bury, 1st Earl of Charleville
- 1822–1835: John Brinkley
- 1835–1837: Bartholomew Lloyd
- 1837–1846: Sir William Rowan Hamilton
- 1846–1851: Humphrey Lloyd
- 1851–1856: Thomas Romney Robinson
- 1856–1861: James Henthorn Todd
- 1861–1866: Charles Graves
- 1866–1869: James Talbot, 4th Baron Talbot de Malahide
- 1869–1874: John Hewitt Jellett
- 1874–1876: William Stokes
- 1877–1882: Robert Kane
- 1882–1886: Samuel Ferguson
- 1886–1891: Samuel Haughton
- 1891–1892: William Reeves (died 1892)
- 1892–1896: John Kells Ingram
- 1896–1901: Lawrence Parsons, 4th Earl of Rosse
- 1901–1906: Robert Atkinson
- 1906–1911: Francis Alexander Tarleton
- 1911–1916: John Pentland Mahaffy
- 1916–1921: John Henry Bernard
- 1921–1926: Sydney Young
- 1926–1931: Robert Alexander Stewart Macalister
- 1931–1934: Robert Lloyd Praeger
- 1934–1937: Edward John Gwynn
- 1937–1940: Arthur William Conway
- 1940–1943: Eoin MacNeill
- 1943–1946: Richard Irvine Best
- 1946–1949: Thomas Percy Claude Kirkpatrick
- 1949–1952: John James Nolan
- 1952–1955: Patrick Joseph Boylan (1879–1974)
- 1955–1958: James O'Connor (1886–1974)
- 1958–1961: Aubrey Osborn Gwynn
- 1961–1964: John Lighton Synge
- 1964–1966: Joseph Doyle (1891–1974)
- 1966–1967: Myles Dillon
- 1967–1970: Joseph J. Raftery (1913–1992)
- 1970–1973: Vincent Barry
- 1973–1976: David Greene
- 1976–1979: Frank Mitchell
- 1979–1982: Proinsias Mac Cana
- 1982–1985: William Arthur Watts
- 1985–1987: T. K. Whitaker
- 1987–1990: James Dooge
- 1990–1993: Aidan Clark
- 1993–1996: John O. Scanlan
- 1996–1999: Michael Herity
- 1999–2002: Thomas David Spearman
- 2002–2005: Michael E. F. Ryan
- 2005–2008: James Slevin
- 2008–2011: Nicholas Canny
- 2011–2014: Luke Drury
- 2014–2017: Mary E. Daly
- 2017–2020: Michael Peter Kennedy
- 2020–2023: Mary Canning
- 2023–2026: Pat Guiry
- 2026–present: Daniel Carey

== Awards of the Royal Irish Academy ==
The premier award of the Royal Irish Academy is the Cunningham Medal, which it awards every three years in recognition of "outstanding contributions to scholarship and the objectives of the Academy." Other awards include the Gold Medals which are awarded to two people each year who "made a demonstrable and internationally recognised outstanding scholarly contribution in their fields," and US-Ireland Research Innovation Awards which are awarded annually in three categories HEIs, Multinationals and SMEs.

The Royal Irish Academy also operates a number of prizes including the annual Hamilton Prize for Mathematics which it awards to the best mathematic students as nominated by academic institutions, the Kathleen Lonsdale Prize for Chemistry which is awarded to the most outstanding Irish Ph.D. thesis in the general area of the chemical sciences, and the biennial RIA Michel Deon Prize for Non-Fiction which honours the life of Michel Déon (1919–2016) by continuing his work in supporting and championing writing talent and sustains his legacy in celebrating the richness and diversity of cultural experience in Europe.

== Notable members ==
- Sir Francis Beaufort, hydrographer and originator of the Beaufort Wind Scale
- Jan Łukasiewicz, Polish logician and philosopher best known for Polish notation and Łukasiewicz logic
- Sir William Betham (1779–1853), Ulster King of Arms 1820–1853
- Frederick Boland, diplomat
- Andrew Nicholas Bonaparte-Wyse, civil servant
- Angela Bourke, award-winning author and academic
- Hugh Carleton, 1st Viscount Carleton, eminent judge and politician
- James Rawson Carroll, architect
- Rónadh Cox, geologist and geomorphologist
- Éamon de Valera, Taoiseach 1932–1948; 1951–1954; 1957–1959 and President of Ireland 1959–1973
- James Dooge, engineer, Government minister, architect of the European Union; President of the RIA 1986–1990
- Samuel Ferguson (1810–1886)
- Garret FitzGerald, Taoiseach 1981–1982 and 1982–1987
- Ray Flannery, (1941–2013), theoretical physicist known for his work in atomic and molecular physics
- Aloys Fleischmann (1910–1992), composer
- James Gandon, architect
- Edmund Getty, antiquarian and naturalist
- Henry Grattan, politician
- Seamus Heaney (1939–2013), poet, Nobel laureate
- William Rowan Hamilton, mathematician
- Walter Heitler, physicist
- Thomas Dix Hincks (1767–1857), orientalist and naturalist
- John Houston (1802–1845), surgeon and anatomist
- Richard Kirwan, chemist, meteorologist, and mineralogist
- Seán Lemass, Taoiseach 1959–1966
- F. S. L. Lyons, historian
- Gearóid Mac Eoin, linguist and historian, member since 1975
- Eoin MacNeill, politician and historian
- William Hunter McCrea, astronomer
- Frank Mitchell, naturalist
- Michael Morris, 3rd Baron Killanin and President of the International Olympic Committee
- Thomas E. Nevin (1906–1986), elected in March 1942, distinguished career in molecular spectroscopy
- Cormac O'Ceallaigh, cosmic ray physicist
- Charles O'Conor, writer, antiquarian and protagonist for Catholic civil rights
- Cearbhall Ó Dálaigh, Attorney General 1946–1948, 1951–1953 and President of Ireland 1974–1976
- Fergus O'Rourke, zoologist
- John O'Donovan (1806–1861), Irish language scholar and place-name expert
- Eva Philbin (1914–2005), chemist and first female senior vice-president
- David Puttnam, Lord Puttnam
- William Reeves (1815–1892), antiquarian and bishop, president of the academy in 1891
- Erwin Schrödinger (1931), Nobel physics laureate
- Claude Shannon (1916–2001), computer scientist, known as the "father of the Information Age"
- Mary Somerville (1780–1872), science writer, astronomer, mathematician
- Robert William Smith (1807–1873), surgeon and pathologist
- James Henthorn Todd (1805–1869), biblical scholar, educator, and Irish historian
- Johannes Diderik van der Waals (1837–1923), winner of the 1910 Nobel Prize in physics
- Ernest T. S. Walton (1935), Nobel physics laureate
- Trevor West, mathematician and senator
- Robert Anthony Welch (1945–2013), author, educator, and literary historian
- Isaac Weld (1774–1856), topographical author
- William Wilde (1815–1876), polymath and father of the playwright, Oscar Wilde
- Edward Percival Wright (1834–1910), ophthalmic surgeon, botanist and zoologist

== See also ==
- Dictionary of the Irish Language
- Great Book of Lecan
- Proceedings of the Royal Irish Academy
- List of Irish learned societies
