= Howard Spensley =

Australian politician

Howard Spensley (1834 – 8 August 1902) was an Australian lawyer and politician and a British Liberal politician.

Spensley was the son of William Spensley of Edmonton, Middlesex. He was educated at a mercantile academy and emigrated to Australia in 1859. He worked as a journalist in Melbourne for several years. In 1864, he was called to the bar of the Supreme Court of Victoria and in 1871 was elected a member of the Victorian Legislative Assembly representing Portland. He was Solicitor-General of Victoria from 1871 to 1873, and Commissioner for Victoria to the London Exhibition of 1873. He married Martha Staughton from Exford, Victoria in 1868.

He returned to England, where he was called to the bar at the Middle Temple in 1876 and was representative of the colony of Victoria at the Geographical Congress held at Venice in 1881 and Commissioner for Victoria at the Amsterdam Exhibition of 1883. He was made a Privy Councillor of the Colony of Victoria and was one of the Advising Council of the Agent General for Victoria in London.

In the 1885 general election, Spensley was elected Member of Parliament for Finsbury Central but lost the seat in the 1886 general election.

He died at his residence Earl's Court Square, South Kensington in 1902, aged 69.

Victorian Legislative Assembly
Preceded by James Butters	Member for Portland; 1871–1873	Succeeded by Thomas Must
Political offices
Preceded by Henry Wrixon	Solicitor-General of Victoria; April 1871 - June 1872	Succeeded by George Kerferd
Parliament of the United Kingdom
New constituency	Member of Parliament for Finsbury Central; 1885 – 1886	Succeeded by Frederick Thomas Penton
