= David Arnott (politician) =

Australian politician

- Born: David Levis Edmund Andrea Arnott; January 15, 1899; Portland, Victoria, Australia
- Died: September 18, 1960 (aged 61); Tyrendarra, Australia
- Occupation: Politician

David Levis Edmund Andrea Arnott (15 January 1899 – 18 September 1960) was an Australian politician.

He was born in Portland to farmer John Arnott and Theresa Valentine Pedrazzi. He attended state schools and became a farmer at Tyrendarra. On 21 May 1924 he married Amy Stanford, with whom he had four children. He was president and secretary of the local Pastoral and Agricultural Society and a member of the Victorian Dairyfarmers Association. In 1952 he was elected to the Victorian Legislative Council as a Labor Party member for Western Province. He served until his defeat in 1958, and he died at Tyrendarra two years later.

Victorian Legislative Council
Preceded by Robert Rankin	Member for Western; 1952–1958; Served alongside: Hugh MacLeod; Ronald Mack	Succeeded by Kenneth Gross
