= George Gibbs (Australian politician) =

Australian politician (1908–1968)

George Sampson Gibbs (25 April 1908 – 25 May 1968) was an Australian politician.

Gibbs was born in Richmond to clerk George Thomas Pender Gibbs and Alberta Sampson. He attended Scotch College and became a schoolteacher, teaching at Malvern, Cann River, Boolarra South, Sunny Creek and Swan Marsh and serving as headmaster at Dennington and Koroit. In 1935 he married Rose Wilmott Jones, with whom he had three children.

In 1955 Gibbs was elected to the Victorian Legislative Assembly as the Liberal and Country Party member for Portland. He was a backbencher and an opponent of capital punishment. He lost preselection in 1967 and stood unsuccessfully as an Independent Liberal. In 1968 he joined the Country Party, but he died at Warrnambool later that year.

Victorian Legislative Assembly
Preceded by Robert Holt	Member for Portland; 1955–1967	Succeeded by Don McKellar
