= Daniel Hughes (politician) =

Australian banker, barrister, and politician

Daniel Abraham Hughes (c.1819 – 27 May 1879) was a banker, barrister and politician in colonial Victoria, a member of the Victorian Legislative Assembly.

Hughes was the son of W. Hughes who owned Hughes' Wharf, Melbourne. Daniel Hughes was a bank clerk in Ireland, then a clerk in the London office of P&O.

In November 1856, Hughes was elected to the Victorian Legislative Assembly for Portland, a position he held until August 1859.

Hughes died in Mollison street, Sandhurst (later renamed Bendigo).

Victorian Legislative Assembly
New district	Member for Portland; November 1856 – August 1859; With: Hugh Childers 1856–57; John Findlay 1857–59	Succeeded by Norman McLeod
