= Ronald Mack =

Australian accountant and politician

Sir Ronald William Mack (20 May 1904 – 12 February 1968) was an Australian politician.

Mack was born at Warrnambool to wool buyer Frederick David Mack and Elizabeth Edith née Hatton (both Victorian-born). He attended Warrnambool High School and qualified as an accountant in 1927. From 1930 he ran his own accountancy firm. On 16 February 1935 he married Helen Isabel Janet Lindsay, née Nicol (died 1957), a 38-year-old divorcee; they had one son. He later remarried on 20 September 1958 Winifred Helen Crutchfield, née Campion, a 49-year-old widow and a teacher of commerce. From 1939 to 1940 he was a member of Warrnambool City Council. He served in World War II and was twice mentioned in dispatches; he lost his right eye at El Alamein. From 1944, he was again an accountant, and he became involved in the Liberal and Country Party.

Mack served one term in the Victorian Legislative Assembly as the member for Warrnambool. On 18 June 1955 he was elected to the Victorian Legislative Council as a member for Western Province. He served as Minister of Health from 26 July 1961 to 14 September 1965, He was elected President of the Legislative Council in September 1965, a position he held until his death from cancer in his flat at Hawthorn on 12 February 1968. He was knighted in 1967, Warrnambool's first.

Victorian Legislative Assembly
Preceded by Henry Bailey	Member for Warrnambool; 1950–1952	Succeeded by Malcolm Gladman
Victorian Legislative Council
Preceded by Sir Gordon McArthur	President of the Victorian Legislative Council; 1965–1968	Succeeded by Raymond Garrett
Preceded by Hugh MacLeod	Member for Western; 1955–1968; Served alongside: David Arnott; Kenneth Gross	Succeeded by Clive Mitchell
