= Norman McLeod (Australian politician) =

Australian politician

John Norman McLeod, often known as Norman McLeod (8 October 1816 – 18 April 1886) was a pastoralist and politician in colonial Victoria, a member of the Victorian Legislative Assembly.

McLeod was born in Durham, England, son of Donald McLeod and Catherine McLean. McLeod emigrated to Van Diemen's Land 1820 and moved to Indented Head in the Port Phillip District (later to become the colony of Victoria) in July 1837.

In April 1859, McLeod was elected to the Victorian Legislative Assembly for Portland, a position he held until resigning in September 1860.

McLeod's son Donald Norman McLeod also represented Portland in the Assembly.

Victorian Legislative Assembly
| Preceded by Daniel Hughes; John Findlay | Member for Portland; April 1859 – September 1860; With: Hugh Childers 1856–57; John Findlay 1857–59 | Succeeded by William Haines |
