= John Purser (mathematician) =

Irish mathematician (1835–1903)

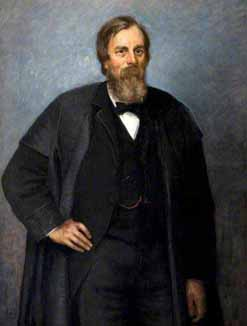
- Portrait by his cousin Sarah Purser
- Born: 24 August 1835; Dublin, Ireland
- Died: 18 October 1903 (aged 68); Dublin, Ireland
- Education: Trinity College, Dublin
- Scientific career
- Fields: Mathematics
- Workplaces: Queen's College, Belfast
- Notable students: Joseph Larmor, John Henry MacFarland, William McFadden Orr

John Purser (1835–1903) was an Irish mathematician, who was professor at Queen's College, Belfast.

== Life and work ==
Son of John Tertius Purser (1809–1893), the general manager of the well known brewery Guinness, Purser was educated in a wealthy family, which included artists, as his cousin Sarah Purser, or engineers, as his brother-in-law John Purser Griffith. He was the brother of mathematician Frederick Purser. He studied in Trinity College, Dublin, graduating BA in mathematics in 1856.

The following years Purser was tutor to the children of Lord Rosse, Lawrence and Charles. In 1863, he was appointed professor of mathematics at Queen's College, Belfast, he was in place until his retirement in 1901.

Purser is much better known as a teacher than as a researcher, and he had a good number of notable students, including Sir Joseph Larmor, theoretical physicist who served as Lucasian Professor of Mathematics at the University of Cambridge; Charles Parsons, the inventor of the turbine; Sir John Henry MacFarland, who became Chancellor of Melbourne University; and William McFadden Orr.

== Bibliography ==
- Hughes, David (2006). "A Bottle of Guinness Please": The Colourful History of Guinness. Phimboy. ISBN 978-0-9553713-0-1.
- Flood, Raymond (2006). "Mathematics in Victorian Ireland". BSHM Bulletin. 21 (3): 200–211. doi:10.1080/17498430600964433. ISSN 1749-8430. S2CID 122564180.
