= Clive Mitchell (politician) =

Australian politician

Clive Alexander Mitchell (6 October 1918 – 25 August 2010) was an Australian politician.

He was born in Rainbow to farmer William Alexander Mitchell and Ivy Johnson. He attended state schools locally and became a farmer at Heywood; he also served in the military from 1940 to 1941 during World War II. In February 1947 he married Betty Adeline Schroeder, with whom he had five children. He was closely involved with woolgrowing organisations, and served on Portland Shire Council from 1952 to 1968, and also from 1974. He was council president from 1956 to 1957 and from 1981 to 1982. A long-standing member of the Country Party, he was elected to the Victorian Legislative Council in 1968 for Western Province, serving until his defeat in 1973. He subsequently ran for the lower house seat of Portland in 1976 and for Western Province again in 1979. Mitchell died in 2010.

Victorian Legislative Council
Preceded by Ronald Mack	Member for Western; 1968–1973; Served alongside: Kenneth Gross	Succeeded by Digby Crozier
