= Leonard Rodda =

Australian politician

Leonard Roy Rodda (17 April 1892 – 27 January 1970) was an Australian politician.

Born in Tarranyurk to farmer Frederick Rodda and Elizabeth Mary Curnow, he attended Tarranyurk State School before working on the family farm. He served for three years in the Australian Imperial Force during World War I, serving with the Australian Siege Battery in France before returning to farm at Horsham and Tarranyurk. He married Violet May Wurfel on 12 October 1920; they had three children. A foundation member of the Country Party in 1920, he owned a sheep stud from 1931 to 1937, when he was elected to the Victorian Legislative Council for Western Province. He served as a minister without portfolio from January 1942 to July 1943. He resigned in 1943 to contest the federal seat of Wannon unsuccessfully, and was re-elected to the Council at the by-election for his old seat. He resigned to contest Wannon again in 1946, also unsuccessfully, and retired to Warracknabeal in 1951. Rodda remained active in the local community and served on Warracknabeal Shire Council from 1953 to 1967, including two periods as president (1957–58, 1961–63). He died in 1970 at Erindale in South Australia.
