= Donald Norman McLeod =

Australian politician (1848–1914)

Donald Norman McLeod (10 June 1848 – 25 October 1914) was an Australian pastoralist and politician, a member of the Victorian Legislative Assembly.

McLeod was born on Borhoneyghurk station along the Moorabool River near Portland in what was then the Colony of New South Wales and was the second son of John Norman McLeod who represented the seat of Portland in the Victorian Legislative Assembly from 1859 to 1860. McLeod grew up in Portland and finished his schooling at Scotch College in Melbourne. At age 16 he moved to his uncle's property, near Apsley to learn about sheep farming. By 1872 McLeod, in partnership with John Hancock, shipped stock to Nickol Bay, near Roebourne and McLeod set up Chirritta Station. In 1879 McLeod married Charlotte Harriet Bussell

McLeod sold Chirritta in 1883 and returned to Portland to set up a dairy farm named Yannarie. He sold Yannarie in 1892 but remained in the area as the member for Portland in the Victorian Legislative Assembly from July 1894 to October 1900. McLeod left the area in 1899 and took up Minilya Station in the Mid West of Western Australia. He had a wife, with whom he had six daughters and five sons. He died in Perth on 25 October 1914.

Victorian Legislative Assembly
Preceded by Henry Wrixon	Member for Portland; July 1894 – October 1900	Succeeded by Ewen Cameron
