= Electoral district of Portland =

Former state electoral district of Victoria, Australia

Coordinates: 38°20′S 141°36′E

Portland Victoria—Legislative Assembly
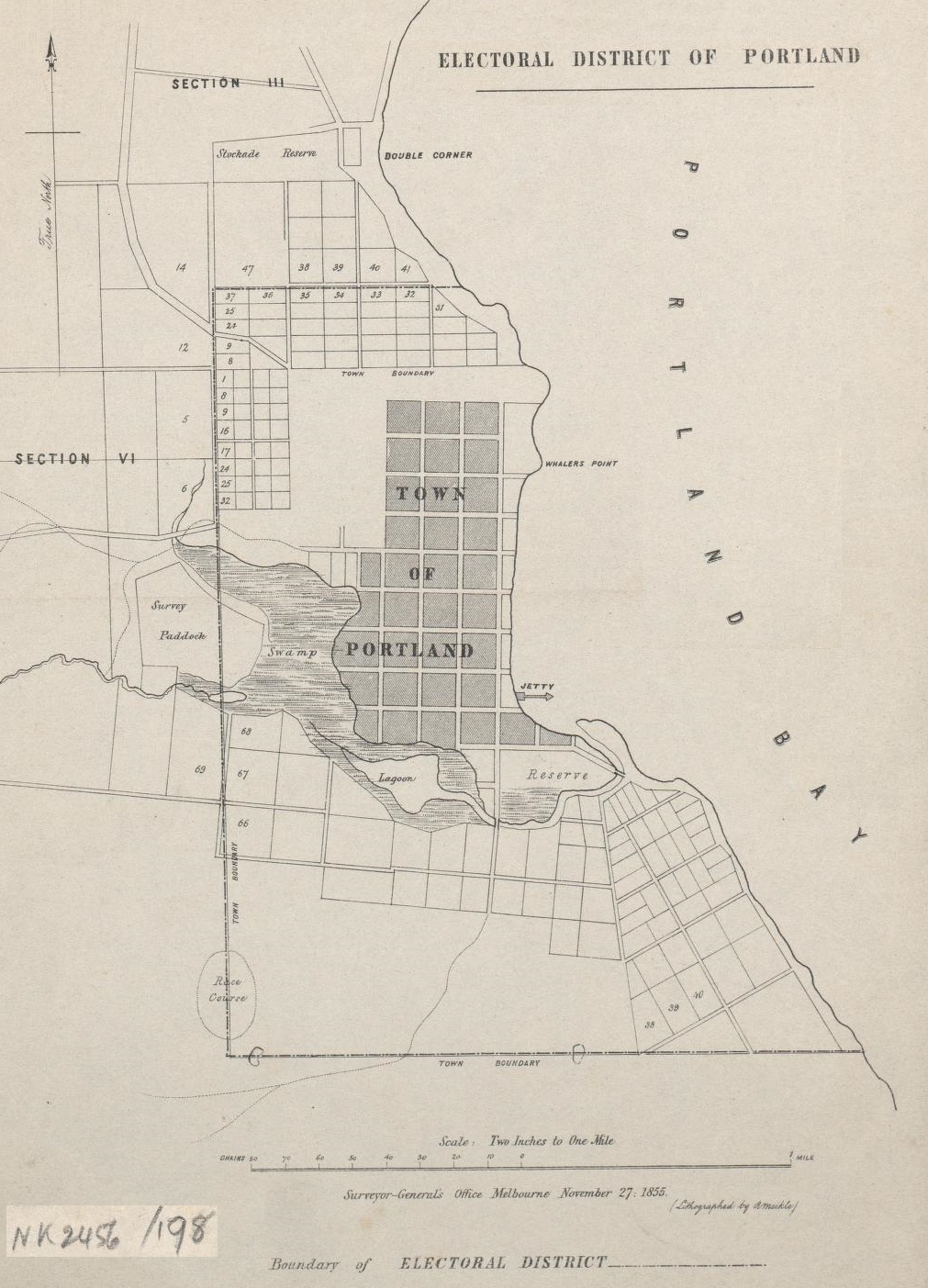
- Electoral District of Portland, 1855
- State: Victoria
- Dates current: 1856–1904, 1945–2002
- Area: 11.5 km^{2} (4.4 sq mi)
- Demographic: Urbanised Rural

The electoral district of Portland was an electoral district of the Legislative Assembly in the Australian state of Victoria.

It was based on the town of Portland, Victoria.

== Members for Portland ==
First incarnation (1856–1904), Two members (1856–1859)
Member	Party	Term	Member	Party	Term
Hugh Childers	None	1856–1857	Daniel Hughes	None	1856–1859
John Findlay	None	1857–1859	Daniel Hughes	None	1856–1859
Norman McLeod	None	1859–1860			
William Haines	None	1860–1864			
John MacPherson	None	1864–1865			
Butler Aspinall	None	1866–1867			
James Butters	None	1868–1871			
Howard Spensley	None	1871–1873			
Thomas Must	None	1873–1877			
Thomas Cope	None	1877–1880			
Henry Wrixon	None	1880–1894			
Donald Norman McLeod	None	1894–1900			
Ewen Cameron	Conservative	1900–1904			

Second incarnation (1945–2002)
Member	Party	Term
Robert Holt	Labor	1945–1947
Harry Hedditch	Country	1947–1949
Harry Hedditch	Liberal and Country	1949–1950
Robert Holt	ALP	1950–1955
George Gibbs	Liberal	1955–1967
George Gibbs	Independent	1967
Don McKellar	Liberal	1967–1970
Bill Lewis	Labor	1970–1973
Don McKellar	Liberal	1973–1985
Digby Crozier	Liberal	1985–1988
Denis Napthine	Liberal	1988–2002

Napthine went on to represent the Electoral district of South-West Coast which was created in 2002.
