= Roger Hallam (Australian politician) =

Australian politician (born 1943)

Roger Murray Hallam (born 13 August 1943) is a former Australian politician.

== Biography ==
Born in Hamilton, Victoria, Roger Murray Hallam attended local schools and worked in a local store, which he managed from 1975 to 1982 before becoming managing director until 1984. He undertook a Bachelor of Business by correspondence from the Warrnambool Institute of Advanced Education in 1977, becoming an accountant. He also served on Hamilton City Council from 1982 to 1983.

In 1983, Hallam contested the Wannon by-election for the National Party. He did not win the seat.

In 1985 Hallam was elected to the Victorian Legislative Council for Western Province as a National Party member and was appointed the Nationals' spokesman on community services. In 1988 he became the Deputy Leader of the party in the upper house and party whip, and assumed the shadow portfolios of Finance (1990–91), Regional Development and Local Government and WorkCare (1991–92). After the Coalition won government in 1992, he became Minister for Regional Development and Local Government, and was promoted to Finance and Gaming in 1996.

The Coalition lost office in 1999 and Hallam became shadow Minister for Finance and Gaming, as well as the Nationals' upper house leader.

Hallam retired from politics in 2002.

On 13 December 2012 Hallam was appointed by Agriculture and food security minister Peter Walsh as the chair of the Victorian Hunting Advisory Committee
