= Bill Lewis (Australian politician) =

Australian politician

William John Lewis (16 October 1916 – 8 December 1991) was an Australian politician.

Lewis was born at Penshurst and worked as a truck driver and postal worker before serving in the military during World War II. After his return he was a cartage contractor from 1947, and was president of the local Penshurst branch of the Labor Party. He was elected to the Victorian Legislative Assembly in 1970 as the member for Portland, but was defeated in 1973. Lewis died in 1991.

Victorian Legislative Assembly
Preceded by Don McKellar	Member for Portland; 1970–1973	Succeeded by Don McKellar
