= Thomas Cope (politician) =

Australian politician

Thomas Cope (c.1814 – 3 April 1882) was a politician in colonial Victoria (Australia).

Cope was born in Postgate, Staffordshire, England, and arrived in Melbourne around 1857.

Cope was a member of the Victorian Legislative Assembly for Normanby from May 1868 to April 1877 and member for Portland from May 1877 to February 1880.

Cope died in Abbotsford, Victoria.
