= Bruce Chamberlain =

Australian politician (1939–2005)

Bruce Anthony Chamberlain AM (9 August 1939 – 1 October 2005) was an Australian politician.

He was born at Brighton in Melbourne to Peter Henry Chamberlain, a railways paymaster, and Eileen, née Haddad. After attending De La Salle College in Malvern, he studied at the University of Melbourne, receiving a Bachelor of Arts and a Bachelor of Law. On 6 February 1965 he married Paula Swan, with whom he had four children. In 1965 he became a partner with the solicitors' firm Melville, Orton & Lewis, while also acquiring farming property near Hamilton. He served on Hamilton City Council from 1969 to 1973.

In 1973 he was elected to the Victorian Legislative Assembly as the Liberal member for Dundas. His seat was abolished in 1976 and he won election to the Victorian Legislative Council for Western Province. Appointed Shadow Minister for Conservation and Planning in 1982, he became Shadow Attorney-General in 1985 and Leader of the Opposition in the Upper House in 1986. In 1988 he moved to the portfolio of Local Government and Major Projects, afterwards taking Industry, Technology and Resources (1989–90), Planning and State Growth (1990–91), and Local Government (1990–92). From 1992 to 2002, he served as the 17th President of the Legislative Council of Victorian Parliament. He was appointed a Member of the Order of Australia on Australia Day 2005, but on 1 October that year he died in Armadale, Victoria.
