= Jonathan Coleman (physicist) =

Irish physicist (born 1973)

Jonathan N. Coleman FRS MRIA FInstP MAE
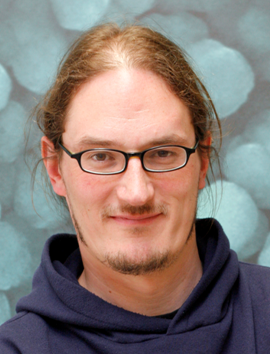
- Jonathan Coleman in 2018
- Born: 22 January 1973 (age 53)
- Education: Trinity College Dublin (BA, PhD)
- Known for: Liquid phase exfoliation, 2D materials, Printed electronics
- Awards: Royal Irish Academy Gold Medal (2023); Tabor Medal (2022); ACS Nano Award (2018); Kroll Medal (2012)
- Scientific career
- Fields: Chemical physics Nanomaterials
- Workplaces: Trinity College Dublin
- Thesis: Transport properties of nanostructured materials (1999)
- Doctoral advisor: Werner J. Blau
- Doctoral students: Valeria Nicolosi

Jonathan Nesbit Coleman is the Erasmus Smith's Professor of Natural and Experimental Philosophy in the School of Physics and a Principal Investigator in CRANN and the AMBER Research Centre at Trinity College Dublin. Coleman's research focuses on solution-processing of nanomaterials and their use in applications. He has worked on liquid phase exfoliation, a widely used method of preparing two-dimensional nanosheets.

== Early life and education ==
Coleman attended the King's Hospital School, before studying for a BA in experimental physics in Trinity College Dublin. He completed a PhD in physics in TCD in 1999 under Professor Werner Blau.

== Research and career ==
Coleman became a lecturer in physics at TCD in 2001 rising to Professor of Chemical Physics (2011 - 2022) and later Erasmus Smith's Professor (2022 - present). He is currently (2022) the Head of the School of Physics in TCD and a member of the University Council.

The theme of his research is the production and processing of nanomaterials in liquids. The main focus is liquid phase exfoliation of layered crystals such as graphite and inorganic layered compounds. This produces liquid suspensions of two-dimensional nanosheets such as graphene, BN, MoS_{2} or MoO_{3}. He has also performed research on other nanomaterials such as carbon nanotubes and metallic nanowires.

In addition to his publications on liquid phase exfoliation of graphene and other layered materials, he has published a number of papers on applications of solution processed 1D and 2D materials. Examples include: the demonstration of highly sensitive polymer-graphene composite strain sensors; printed nanosheet-based transistors and high-capacity lithium-ion batteries.

Coleman's papers have been cited 120,000 times yielding a h-index of 125.

== Awards and recognition ==
In 2005, Coleman was elected a fellow of Trinity College Dublin. Coleman was named the 2011 Science Foundation Ireland Researcher of the Year and was awarded the Kroll Medal from the Institute of Materials in 2012. In 2018 he was named the ACS Nano Lecture Awardee by the American Chemical Society, and in 2022 was awarded the Tabor Medal by the Institute of Physics. In 2023, he received the Royal Irish Academy Gold Medal in the Physical and Mathematical Sciences. He is also a Member of the Royal Irish Academy (MRIA), a Member of the European Academy of Sciences (EURASC), and was elected a Fellow of the Royal Society in 2025.
