= Mary Dickenson-Auner =

Irish musician

Background information
- Born: Mary Frances Dorothea Dickenson; 24 October 1880; Dublin
- Died: 25 May 1965 (aged 84) Vienna
- Instrument: violin
- Formerly of: Academy of Music, Czech Philharmonic

Mary Dickenson-Auner (24 October 1880 – 25 May 1965) was an Irish violinist, composer, and music teacher. She wrote symphonies, oratorios, operas, and chamber works, with some of her early works appearing under the pseudonym Frank Donnell. During her career as a professional violinist, she performed the world premiere of Béla Bartók's Violin Sonata No. 1 and also worked with Arnold Schoenberg.

== Early life and education ==
Mary Frances Dorothea Dickenson was born in Dublin, Ireland, to a well-connected Irish family. Her mother was Mary Frances MacDonnell, the daughter of Hercules Henry Graves MacDonnell, a rector of Trinity College and cofounder of the Royal Irish Academy of Music. Her great-grandfather was Richard MacDonnell, a provost of Trinity College, and her great-uncles included Major-General Arthur Robert MacDonnell and Richard Graves MacDonnell, a governor of South Australia. Her father was Augustus Maximilian Newton Dickenson, a doctor of medicine.

Her father died in 1883, and her mother moved the family to Wiesbaden, Germany, where she received her first violin lessons at the age of six. Against the wishes of her family, she moved to London around 1897–98, where she briefly studied with composer Samuel Coleridge-Taylor at the Croydon Conservatory of Music and performed his Gypsy Suite, Op. 20 (1898). She may also have studied composition with him, and he dedicated at least one of his subsequent works to her.

On returning to Dublin, she worked briefly as an assistant at the Royal Irish Academy of Music. She then returned to London, still against her family's wishes, to study at the Royal Academy of Music for three years, with the violinist and composer Émile Sauret as her primary teacher. She took her final exams in 1902 in violin and organ performance and in composition. To strengthen her left-hand technique, she then moved to Prague to study for two years with the Czech violinist Otakar Ševčík.

== Career as performer and composer ==
In 1905, Dickenson-Auner made her debut with the Czech Philharmonic. This launched her on a career lasting most of a decade as a touring concert player who performed all around Europe. She also had her first compositions published under the pseudonym Frank Donnell.

In 1909 she settled in Vienna, Austria, living at first with her mother and then with her husband, the teacher (and later Romanian archive delegate) Michael Auner, whom she married in 1912. They moved to Transylvania and had two children, Moira and Michael. In 1917, towards the end of World War I, when Auner was drafted into the army, the couple fled with their children to Bussum in the Netherlands. There her playing was well received by Dutch music critics. Throughout this period, she gave music lessons to help support the family; one of her pupils was the American author Helen Nearing.

In 1920, Dickenson-Auner and her family were able to move back to Vienna, and in 1922, she played the world premiere of Béla Bartók's Violin Sonata No. 1, Op. 21 with pianist Eduard Steuermann at the Konzerthaus there. Her performance was well-received, and that same summer, she presented the work with Bartók himself at the newly founded International Chamber Music Performances in Salzburg. She also joined Arnold Schoenberg's private music performance group and gave concerts under his direction.

In 1925, Dickenson-Auner developed an educational concept for a new kind of 'listening lesson' (Hörstunden) to help train the ears of children through a practical and theoretical introduction to the world of selected composers. It was tested in cooperation with the Vienna School Board, and by 1938 had extended to 17 schools. However, when the Nazis seized power in 1938, Dickenson-Auner was banned from these activities due to her British citizenship. Now almost 60 and amicably divorced from Auner (since 1934), she decided to devote herself exclusively to composing music.

Over the next quarter-century, Dickenson-Auner wrote six symphonies, four operas, and two oratorios, as well as numerous songs and chamber music works. From 1946 to 1962, her chamber works were presented in twelve concerts. Three of her symphonies had their world premiere broadcast by the Austrian Broadcasting Corporation.

Dickenson-Auner wrote polyphonic compositions that combined her love of Johann Sebastian Bach with the 12-tone music of Schoenberg. In choosing musical motifs, however, she often reached back to the Irish folk tunes of her early years, terming the resulting compositions "Celtic Impressionism". She wrote some of her lyrics herself, but she also used selections from the Irish poet William Butler Yeats and from writers influenced by the ideas of the Theosophical Society, of which she had been a member since 1938.

She died in Vienna.

== Selected works ==
- Irish Symphony, Op. 16 (1941)
