= Erasmus Smith's Professor of Natural and Experimental Philosophy =

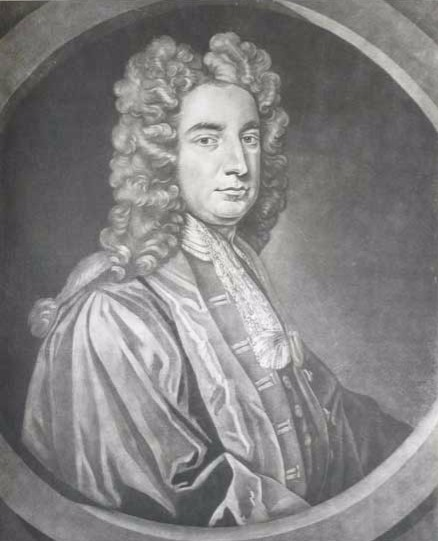
Richard Helsham

Erasmus Smith's Professor of Natural and Experimental Philosophy at Trinity College Dublin is a chair in physics founded in 1724 and funded by the Erasmus Smith Trust, which was established by Erasmus Smith, a wealthy London merchant, who lived from 1611 to 1691. It is one of the oldest dedicated chairs of physics in Britain and Ireland. Originally, the holder was to be elected from the members of the college by an examination to determine the person best qualified for the professorship. Since 1851, the professorship has been supported by Trinity College. Of the 22 holders of this chair, seven were Fellows of the Royal Society while one, Ernest Walton, won the Nobel Prize for Physics.

The inaugural Erasmus Smith's Professor of Natural and Experimental Philosophy was Richard Helsham (1724), who was also the Donegall Lecturer in Mathematics (1723–30) as well as the Regius Professor of Physic (1733–38) at Trinity College. He is best known for his book, A Course of Lectures in Natural Philosophy, which was published posthumously in 1739. This publication is considered to be one of the earliest undergraduate textbooks on Newtonian Physics and was required reading for undergraduates as late as 1849.

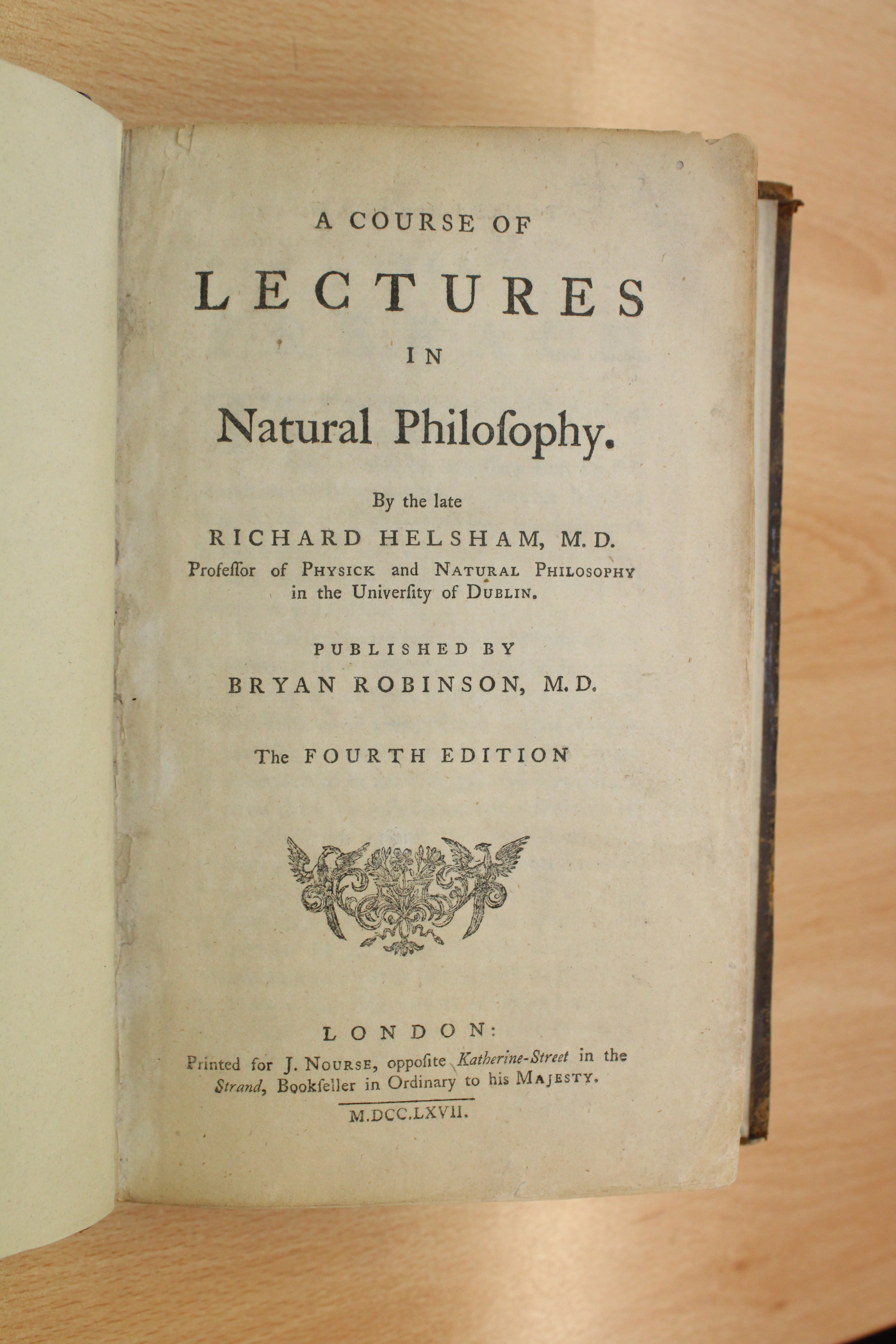
The title page of "A Course of Lectures in Natural Philosophy" (4th edition).

From 1724 to 1847 the chair had a mostly, but not exclusively, mathematical and theoretical orientation, with many holders being also mathematicians, and several such as Bartholomew Lloyd (1822) and James MacCullagh (1843) having previously held the Erasmus Smith's Professor of Mathematics chair. However, this period also saw the appointment of Humphrey Lloyd (1831), who succeeded his father Bartholomew Lloyd, and is considered one of Trinity's greatest experimental physicists. The younger Lloyd is known for experimentally verifying conical refraction, a theoretical prediction made by William Rowan Hamilton about the way light is bent when travelling through a biaxial crystal. He also performed important research on terrestrial magnetism, visiting Gauss and Alexander von Humboldt in Germany, as well as building a “magnetical observatory” in Trinity College Dublin. In 1847 the University Chair of Natural Philosophy (1847) was founded and took on the applied mathematics and theoretical physics role, while Erasmus Smith's Professorship became predominantly a chair of experimental physics.

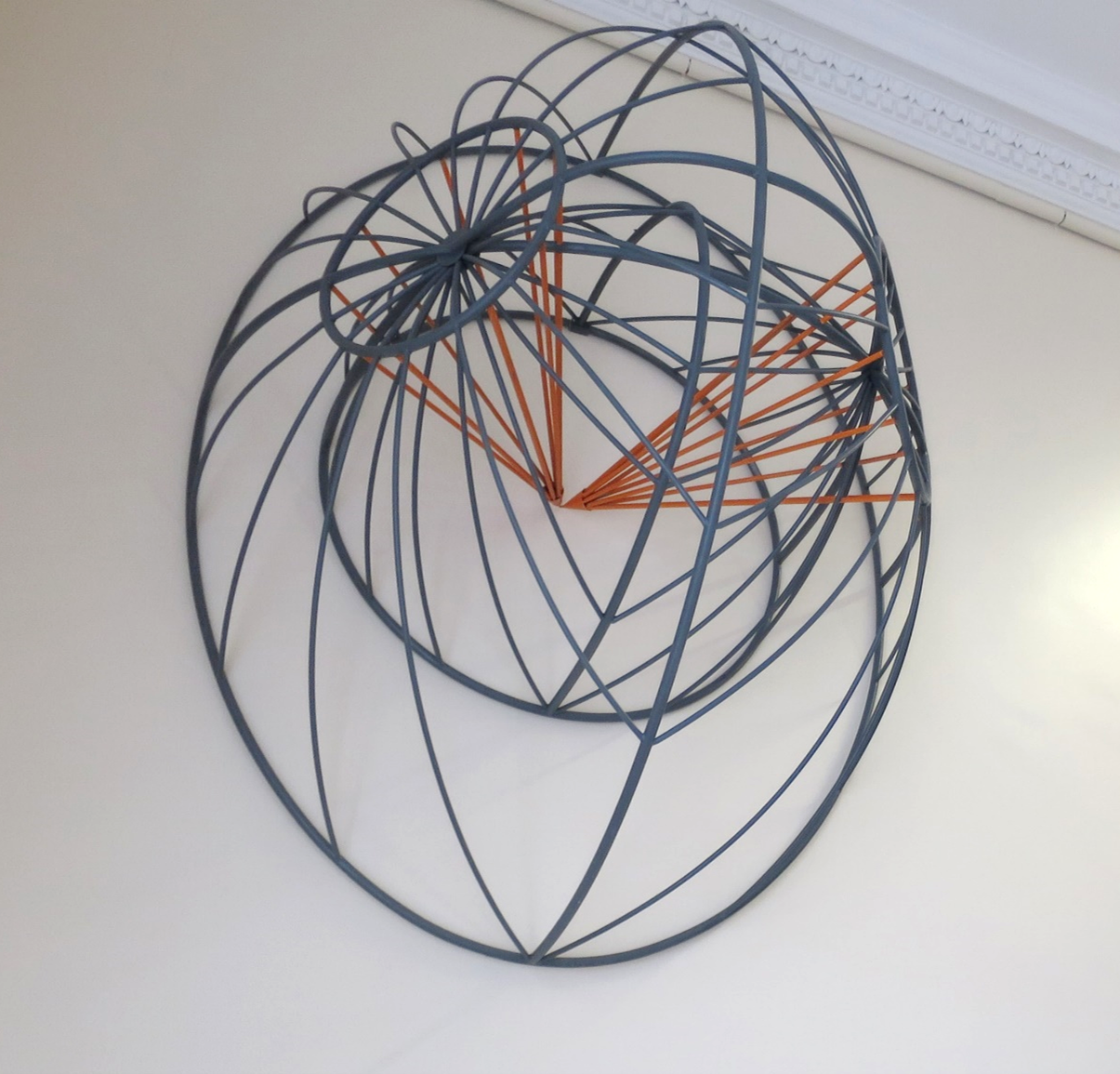
The Radiant Stranger sculpture which is mounted in the School of Physics and represents conical refraction.

Since then, the chair has been occupied by a number of noted experimental physicists. For example, George Francis FitzGerald (1881) is known for his work in electromagnetic theory and for the Lorentz–FitzGerald contraction, which became an integral part of Albert Einstein's special theory of relativity. Ernest Walton (1946) is the only Irish scientist to win the Nobel Prize for Physics. He is best known for his work with John Cockcroft to construct one of the earliest types of particle accelerator, complete with its Cockcroft-Walton voltage-multiplying circuit, devised by themselves and subsequently reproduced widely in high-voltage generators elsewhere. In experiments performed at Cambridge University in the early 1930s using the generator, Walton and Cockcroft became the first team to use a particle beam to transform one element to another.

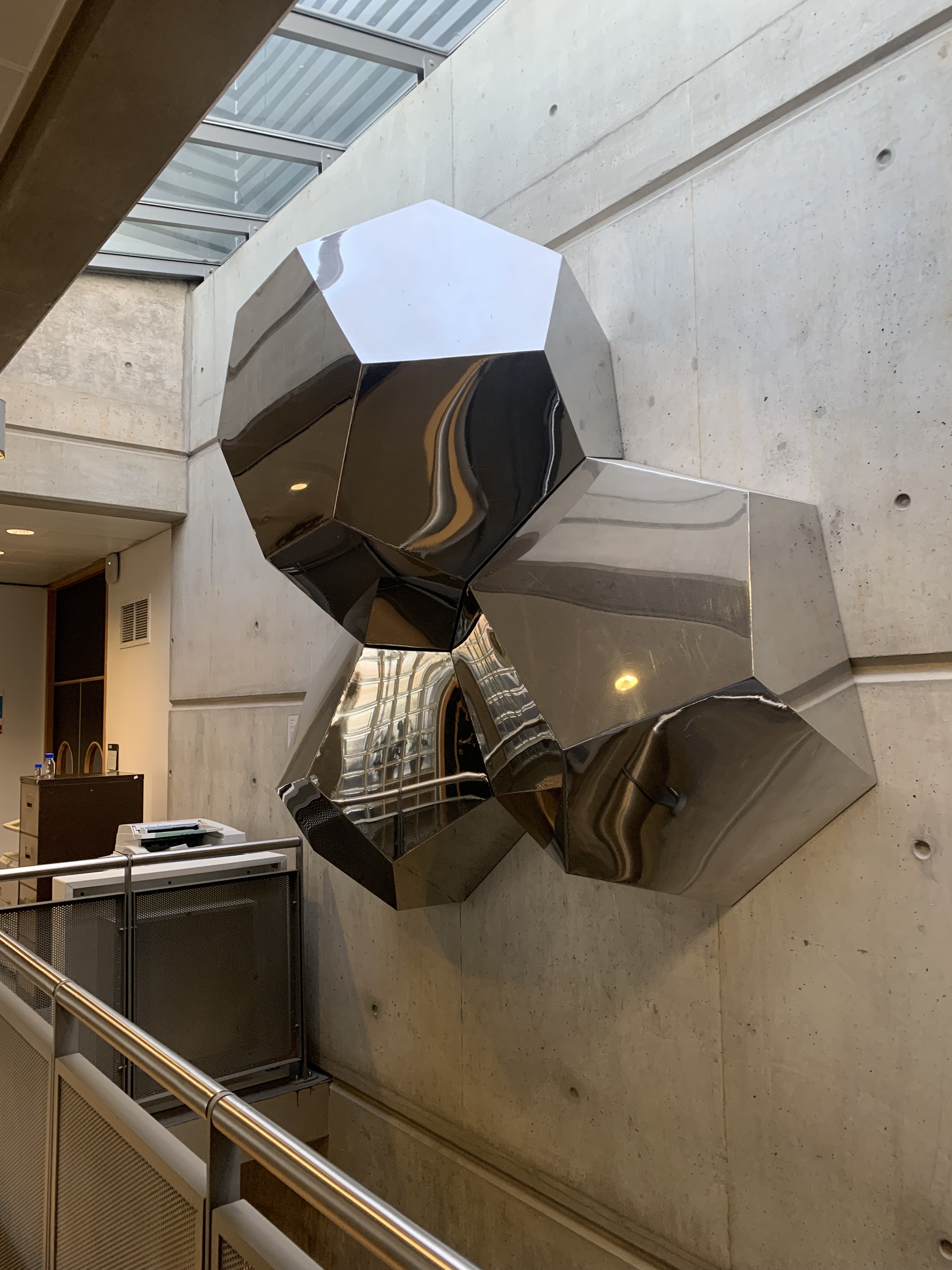
The Throwing Shapes Sculpture which is mounted in the School of Physics and represents the Weaire–Phelan structure.

More recently, Brian Henderson (1974) greatly expanded research in condensed matter and magnetic resonance. Denis Weaire (1984), a theoretical physicist, proposed a counter-example to Lord Kelvin's conjecture on which surface was the most economical way to divide space into cells of equal size with the least surface area. This counter-example is now referred to as the Weaire–Phelan structure. Mike Coey (2007) is a renowned experimentalist in the area of magnetism, who classified magnetic order in amorphous solids, discovered the interstitial rare earth magnet Sm_{2}Fe_{17}N_{3}, developed ferrimagnetic spin electronics and investigated the effects of magnetic fields on water. The current incumbent, Jonathan Coleman (2022), is well known in the field of nanomaterials for his development of liquid phase exfoliation, a versatile method for making 2D materials in large quantities.

A number of prominent Erasmus Smith's Professors have been the subject of Trinity Monday Memorial Discourses, public talks which are accompanied by short published biographies, usually written by prominent Trinity College academics. In addition, the history of the Erasmus Smith Professorship is described in Eric Finch's excellent book, “Three Centuries of Physics in Trinity College Dublin”.

== List of the professors ==
- 1724–1738: Richard Helsham (1683–1738)
- 1738–1743: Caleb Cartwright (1696?–1763)
- 1743–1745: (vacant)
- 1745–1759: William Clement (1707-1782)
- 1759–1769: Hugh Hamilton FRS (1729–1805)
- 1769–1786: Thomas Wilson (1726–1799)
- 1786–1799: Matthew Young (1750–1800)
- 1799–1807: Thomas Elrington (1760–1835)
- 1807–1822: William Davenport (1772-1823)
- 1822–1831: Bartholomew Lloyd (1772–1837)
- 1831–1843: Humphrey Lloyd FRS (1800–1881)
- 1843–1847: James MacCullagh FRS (1809–1847)
- 1848–1854: Robert Dixon (1812–1885)
- 1854–1870: Joseph Galbraith (1818-1890)
- 1870–1881: John Leslie (1830-1881)
- 1881-1901: George FitzGerald FRS (1851-1901)
- 1901–1929: William Thrift (1870–1942)
- 1929–1946: Robert Ditchburn FRS (1903–1987)
- 1946–1974: Ernest Walton (1903–1995)
- 1974–1984: Brian Henderson (1936–2017)
- 1984–2007: Denis Weaire FRS (born 1942)
- 2007–2012: Michael Coey FRS (born 1945)
- 2012–2022: (vacant)
- 2022–present: Jonathan Coleman FRS (born 1973)

== See also ==
- List of professorships at the University of Dublin
- Natural philosophy
