= Brian Henderson (academic) =

Brian Henderson (26 March 1936 – 20 August 2017) was an English solid-state spectroscopic physicist whose career included spells at Atomic Energy Research Establishment (AERE), Keele University, Trinity College Dublin (TCD), and the University of Strathclyde.

== Life and career ==
Brian Henderson was born near Doncaster, and was educated at Maltby Grammar School, then in the West Riding of Yorkshire. He attended the University of Birmingham, obtaining his BSc (in physical metallurgy) in 1958 and PhD in 1960 with a thesis on "The Lattice Spacings of Alloys with Reference to Electronic Constitution".

He became senior scientific officer at the Basic Ceramics Group at AERE (Harwell) in 1962, and joined the staff at Keele University in 1968, being promoted to Reader in Physics there in 1972. Upon the retirement of Nobel laureate Ernest Walton from TCD in 1974, Henderson moved to Ireland and became Erasmus Smith's Professor of Natural and Experimental Philosophy, a position he held for 10 years. TCD elected him a Fellow in 1976, and awarded him an honorary ScD in 1979. (In 1999, long after he had left TCD, he was awarded an honorary Fellowship there.)

Henderson moved back to the UK in 1984, becoming Freeland Professor of Natural Philosophy at Strathclyde University in Glasgow. He later served as Dean of Science and university vice-principal, but retired from there due to ill health in 1997. He had been elected a fellow of the Royal Society of Edinburgh in 1986.

Henderson wrote over 200 papers, authored or co-authored 4 books, and had thirty PhD students. The International Medical University in Malaysia awarded him an honorary DSc in 2006.

== Selected books ==
- Crystal-Field Engineering of Solid-State Laser Materials, by Brian Henderson & Ralph H. Bartram (Cambridge University Press, 2005)
- Optical Spectroscopy of Inorganic Solids, by Brian Henderson & George F. Imbusch (Clarendon, 1989)
