= Bartholomew Lloyd =

Irish mathematician and academic (1772-1837)

The Reverend Bartholomew Lloyd
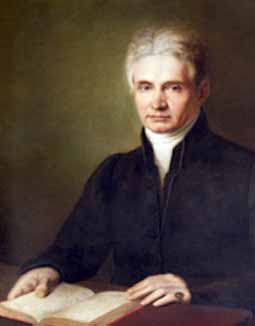

27th Provost of Trinity College Dublin
- In office 1 August 1831 – 30 July 1837
- Preceded by: Samuel Kyle
- Succeeded by: Franc Sadleir

Personal details
- Born: 5 February 1772 New Ross, County Wexford, Ireland
- Died: 24 November 1837 (aged 65) Dublin, Ireland
- Resting place: Trinity College Chapel
- Spouse: Eleanor McLaughlin (m. 1789)
- Children: 10, including Humphrey
- Education: Trinity College, Dublin (B.A., 1796; M.A., 1796; B.D., 1805; D.D., 1808)

Bartholomew Lloyd (5 February 1772 – 24 November 1837) was an Irish mathematician and academic who served as the 27th Provost of Trinity College Dublin from 1831 to 1837. His entire career was spent at Trinity College Dublin. As Erasmus Smith's Professor of Mathematics there, he promoted significant curricular reforms, including the introduction of the teaching of calculus.

== Early life and education ==
Lloyd was born in New Ross, County Wexford, on 5 February 1772. He was the son of Humphrey Lloyd, the son of the Rev. Bartholomew Lloyd of the Abbey House of New Ross. His father died while he was still a boy, and an uncle, the Rev. John Lloyd, rector of Ferns and Kilbride, to whose care he had been given, also died shortly so that he was left to struggle for himself. He entered Trinity College Dublin in 1787 as a pensioner. In 1790, he was elected a Scholar of the College; in 1792, he graduated B.A. in 1796 and obtained a junior fellowship. He graduated M.A. in the same year, B.D. in 1805, and D.D. in 1808.

== Academic career ==
In 1813, Lloyd was appointed Erasmus Smith's Professor of Mathematics on the resignation of Professor William Magee, and in 1822, Erasmus Smith's Professor of Natural and Experimental Philosophy in succession to Professor William Davenport. In both chairs he made a radical change in the methods of teaching. He was the first to introduce French mathematical innovations into Trinity College, including the teaching of calculus.

In 1821, and again in 1823, and 1825, he was elected regius professor of Greek in the university, and in 1823, and again in 1827, Archbishop King's lecturer in divinity. In 1831, he was elected Provost of the college, in succession to Samuel Kyle who became bishop of Cork and Ross.

Trinity's magnetic observatory was founded through Lloyd's influence. In 1835, he was appointed president of the Royal Irish Academy, and in the same year acted as president of the British Association meeting at Dublin. His inaugural address dealt mainly with "the correspondence of the objects of science with divine revelation".

Lloyd died suddenly of apoplexy on 24 November 1837 and was buried in the college chapel. The Lloyd Exhibitions were founded by subscription in 1839 in his memory. A marble bust of him by Thomas Kirk stood in the library of Trinity College.

== Works ==
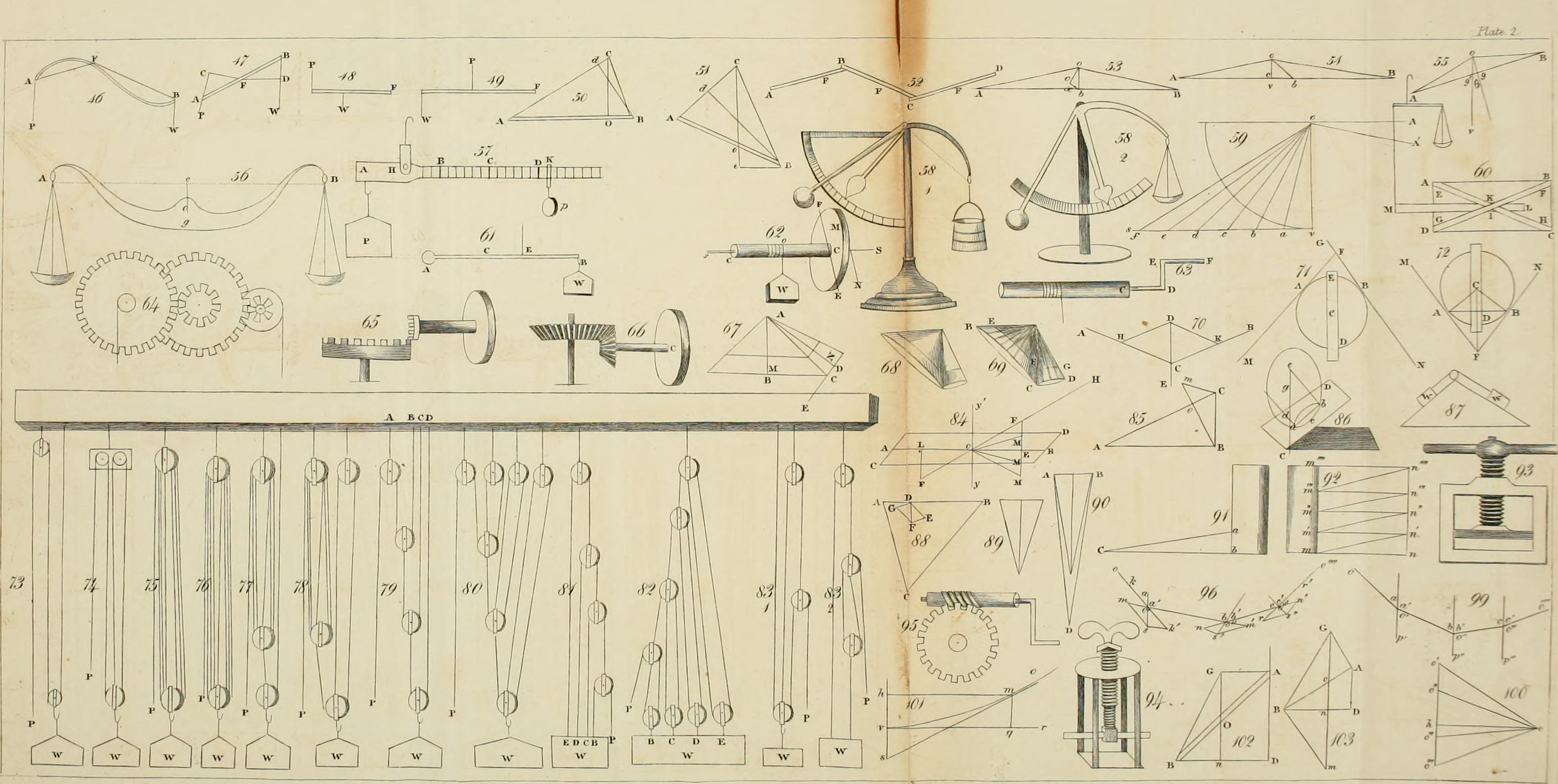
Drawing from the 1835 edition of An Elementary Treatise of Mechanical Philosophy

In addition to scientific papers, Lloyd was the author of

- 1819: A Treatise on Analytic Geometry, London.doi:10.48495/qj72pf99m
- 1822: Discourses, chiefly Doctrinal, delivered in the Chapel of Trinity College, Dublin, London.
- 1826: An Elementary Treatise of Mechanical Philosophy Dublin, link from Internet Archive

== Family ==
Lloyd was married young to Eleanor McLaughlin, by whom he had ten children: four sons and six daughters. The eldest was Humphrey Lloyd. The diplomat Charles Dalton Clifford Lloyd was a grandson and son of Colonel Robert Clifford Lloyd and Annie Savage.

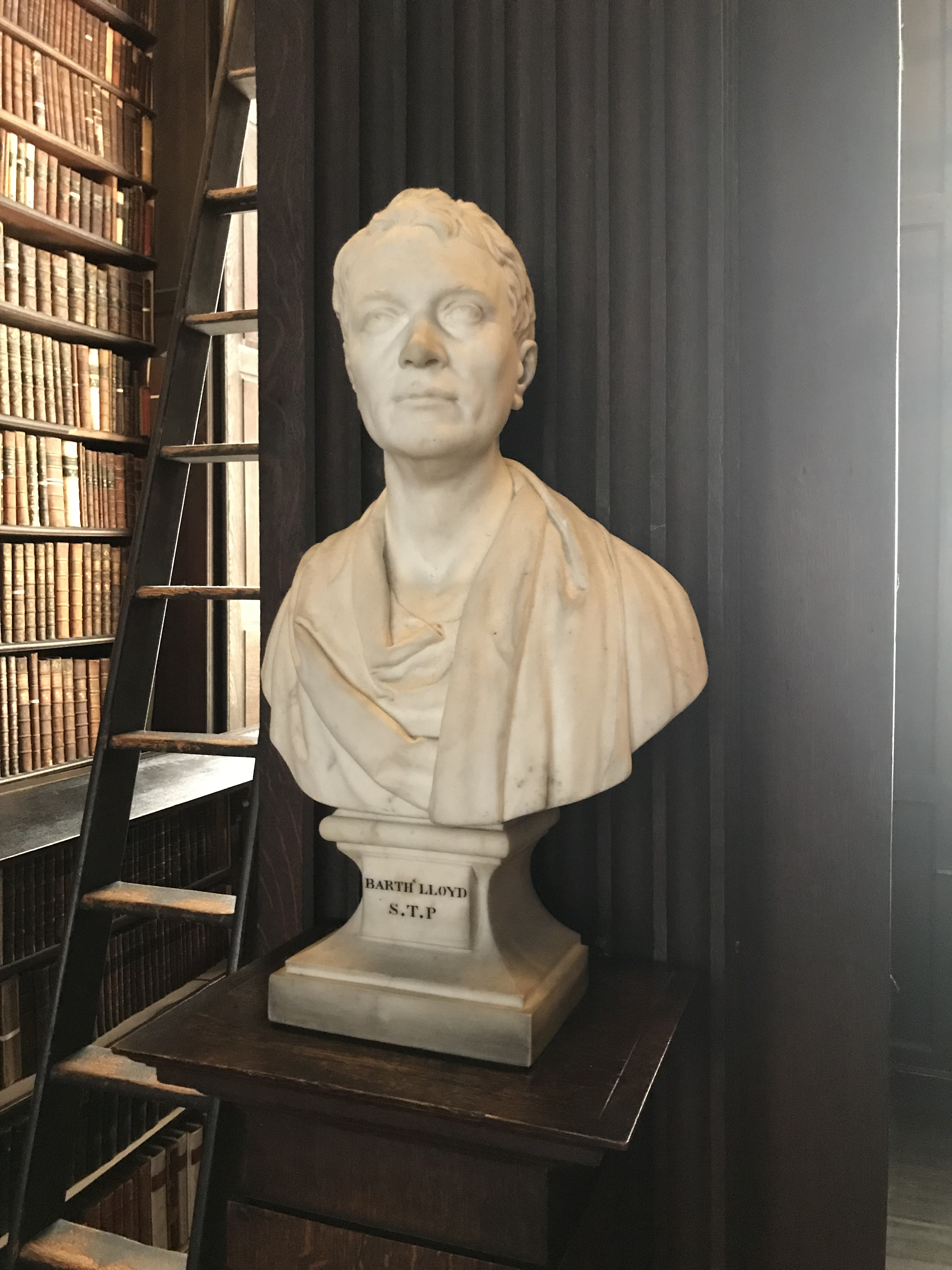
Bust of Bartholomew Lloyd, displayed in the Long Room in TCD

== Legacy ==
In 1821 W. R. Hamilton, at age 16, was given a copy of the Treatise on Analytic Geometry which changed his life. Hamilton was so taken with the analytic geometry that he turned away from Classics and toward mathematics.

A plaque to Lloyd was erected at the Tholsel, New Ross, in 2018, organised by the National Committee for Commemorative Plaques in Science and Technology. It was unveiled by Trinity Provost, Professor Patrick Prendergast.

Academic offices
Preceded by Samuel Kyle	Provost of Trinity College Dublin; 1831–1837	Succeeded by Franc Sadleir
