= John Robert Leslie =

John Robert Leslie may refer to:

- John Robert Leslie (academic) (1831–1881), Irish academic associated with Trinity College Dublin
- John Leslie (politician) (1873–1955), Labour Party politician in the United Kingdom
