= William Davenport =

William Davenport may refer to:

- William Davenport (filmmaker) (born 1960), filmmaker, musician, publisher, writer, teacher and autism activist
- William Davenport (magician) (1841–1877), American magician and brother of magician Ira Erastus Davenport
- William Davenport (scientist) (1772–1823), Irish academic and clergyman
- William N. Davenport (1856–1933), Massachusetts politician
- Willie Davenport (1943–2002), American sprint runner
- William Davenport (slave trader)
