= Thomas Wilson (academic) =

Irish academic and clergyman

Thomas Wilson (1726 – 22 September 1799) was an Irish academic and clergyman most of whose career was spent at Trinity College Dublin (TCD), where he served as the fifth Erasmus Smith's Professor of Natural and Experimental Philosophy (1769–1786).

== Life and career ==
Thomas Wilson was born in County Donegal, son of the Rev John Wilson. He was educated at TCD, where he was a Scholar (1746) and was in the same class as Oliver Goldsmith. He obtained BA (1748), MA (1753), BD (1758), DD (1764), and was elected a Fellow (1753), and later, Senior Fellow. He was Erasmus Smith's Professor of Natural and Experimental Philosophy (1769–1786), and was appointed Archbishop King's Lecturer in Divinity (1785). He resigned from TCD in 1786 to become Rector of Ardstraw, County Tyrone.
