= James MacCullagh =

Irish mathematician (1809–1847)

Professor James MacCullagh MRIA FRS
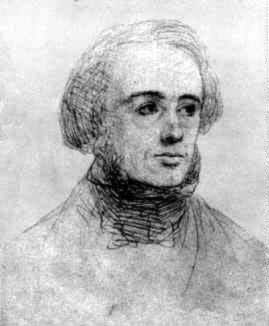
- Born: 1809; Landahaussy, Ireland
- Died: 24 October 1847 (aged 37–38); Dublin, Ireland
- Education: Trinity College, Dublin (BA, MA, LLB, LLD)
- Known for: Special theorem of Conical refraction (1830); Geometry of Optics
- Awards: Cunningham Medal (1838); Copley Medal (1842)
- Honours: Member of the Royal Irish Academy (MRIA); Fellow of the Royal Society (FRS)
- Scientific career
- Fields: Physics; Geometry; Optics; Mathematics
- Workplaces: Trinity College Dublin

James MacCullagh MRIA FRS (1809 – 24 October 1847) was an Irish mathematician and scientist. He served as the Erasmus Smith's Professor of Mathematics at Trinity College Dublin beginning in 1835, and in 1843, he was appointed as the Erasmus Smith's Professor of Natural and Experimental Philosophy. MacCullagh received the Cunningham Medal of the Royal Irish Academy in 1838 for his work on the laws of crystalline reflexion and light refraction, and the Copley Medal in 1842 for his efforts on the nature of light.

== Early life ==
MacCullagh was born in Landahaussy, near Plumbridge, County Tyrone, Ireland, but the family moved to Curly Hill, Strabane when James was about 10. He was the eldest of twelve children and demonstrated mathematical talent at an early age. He entered Trinity College Dublin as a student in 1824, winning a scholarship in 1827 and graduating in 1829.

== Career ==
He became a fellow of Trinity College Dublin in 1832 and was a contemporary there of William Rowan Hamilton. He became a member of the Royal Irish Academy in 1833. In 1835 he was appointed Erasmus Smith's Professor of Mathematics at Trinity College Dublin and in 1843 became Erasmus Smith's Professor of Natural and Experimental Philosophy. He was an inspiring teacher and taught notable scholars, including Samuel Haughton, Andrew Searle Hart, John Kells Ingram and George Salmon.

He had been involved in repeated priority disputes with Hamilton. In 1832, Hamilton published a prediction of conical refraction. In 1833, MacCullagh claimed that it is a special case of a theorem he published in 1830 that he did not explicate since it was not relevant to that particular paper. In 1842, Hamilton speculated on a model of ether, to which MacCullagh claimed that he had speculated on the same model.

Although he worked mostly on optics, he is also remembered for his work on geometry; his most significant work in optics was published in the mid-to-late 1830s; his most significant work on geometry On surfaces of the second order was published in 1843. He was awarded the Cunningham Medal of the Royal Irish Academy in 1838 for his paper on On the laws of crystalline reflexion and refraction. He won the Copley medal for his work on the nature of light in 1842.

MacCullagh was involved with the British Association for the Advancement of Science. He corresponded with many notable scientists, including John Herschel and Charles Babbage. In Passages from the Life of a Philosopher, Charles Babbage wrote that MacCullagh was "an excellent friend of mine" and discussed the benefits and drawbacks of the analytical engine with him.

== Work on Light and Optics ==
MacCullagh's most important paper on optics, An essay towards a dynamical theory of crystalline reflection and refraction, was presented to the Royal Irish Academy in December 1839. The paper begins by defining what was then a new concept, the curl of a vector field. (The term 'curl' was first used by James Clerk Maxwell in 1870.) MacCullagh first showed that the curl is a covariant vector in the sense that its components are transformed in the appropriate manner under coordinate rotation. Taking his cue from George Green, he set out to develop a potential function for a dynamical theory for the transmission of light.

MacCullagh found that a conventional potential function proportional to the squared norm of the displacement field was incompatible with known properties of light waves. In order to support only transverse waves, he found that the potential function must be proportional to the squared norm of the curl of the displacement field. It was accepted that his radical choice ruled out any hope for a mechanical model for the ethereal medium. Nevertheless, the field equations stemming from this purely gyrostatic medium were shown to be in accord with all known laws, including those of Snell and Augustin-Jean Fresnel.

At several points, MacCullagh addresses the physical nature of an ethereal medium having such properties. Not surprisingly, he argues against a mechanical interpretation of the luminiferous aether because he readily admits that no known physical medium could have such a potential function resisting only the rotation of its elements. "Concerning the peculiar constitution of the ether, we know nothing and shall suppose nothing, except what is involved in the foregoing assumptions [rectilinear vibrations in a medium of constant density]... Having arrived at the value of [the potential function], we may now take it for the starting point of our theory, and dismiss the assumptions by which we were conducted to it."

Despite the success of the theory, physicists and mathematicians were not receptive to the idea of reducing physics to a set of abstract field equations divorced from a mechanical model. The notion of the ether as a compressible fluid or similar physical entity was too deeply ingrained in nineteenth-century physical thinking, even for decades after the publication of Maxwell's electromagnetic theory in 1864. MacCullagh's ideas were largely abandoned and forgotten until 1880, when George Francis FitzGerald re-discovered and re-interpreted his findings in the light of Maxwell's work.

William Thomson, 1st Baron Kelvin succeeded in developing a physically realizable model of MacCullagh's rotationally elastic but translationally insensitive ether, consisting of gyrostats mounted on a framework of telescoping rods, described in his paper On a Gyrostatic Adynamic Constitution for Ether (1890).

A fairly modern discussion of MacCullagh's model of the ether can be found in Section 15 of Sommerfeld's book Mechanics of Deformable Bodies.

== Death and legacy ==
MacCullagh was an idealistic nationalist, in the sense of the time. He unsuccessfully contested the election for the Dublin University constituency in 1847. Suffering from overwork and a bout of depression, he died in 1847 by cutting his throat in his rooms at Trinity College Dublin.

After his death, Hamilton helped obtain pensions for his sisters.

In May 2009, an Ulster History Circle plaque was unveiled at his family tomb at St Patrick's Church in Upper Badoney. The plaque was part of events organised by the Glenelly Historical Society to mark his life.

... my intercourse with poor MacCullogh, who was constantly fancying that people were plundering his stores, which certainly were worth the robbing. This was no doubt a sort of premonitory symptom of that insanity that produced his awful end. He could inspire love and yet it was difficult to live with him; and I am thankful that I escaped, so well as I did, from a quarrel, partly because I do not live in College, nor in Dublin. I fear that all this must seem a little unkind; but you will understand me. I was on excellent terms with MacCullogh; ... spoke of those early papers of his, in 1832, to the British Association, when it first met at Oxford; took pains to exhibit the merits of one of his papers on light ... on the occasion of presenting him with a Gold Medal in 1838 ... followed his coffin on foot from the College through the streets of Dublin; cooperated in procuring a pension for his sisters; and subscribed to the MacCullogh Testimonial.

— William Rowan Hamilton, letter to de Morgan in 1852, Graves, R P, Life of Sir William Rowan Hamilton, 3 vols, Dublin, 1882–89. Volume III, page 331
