= Samuel Haughton =

Irish scientific writer

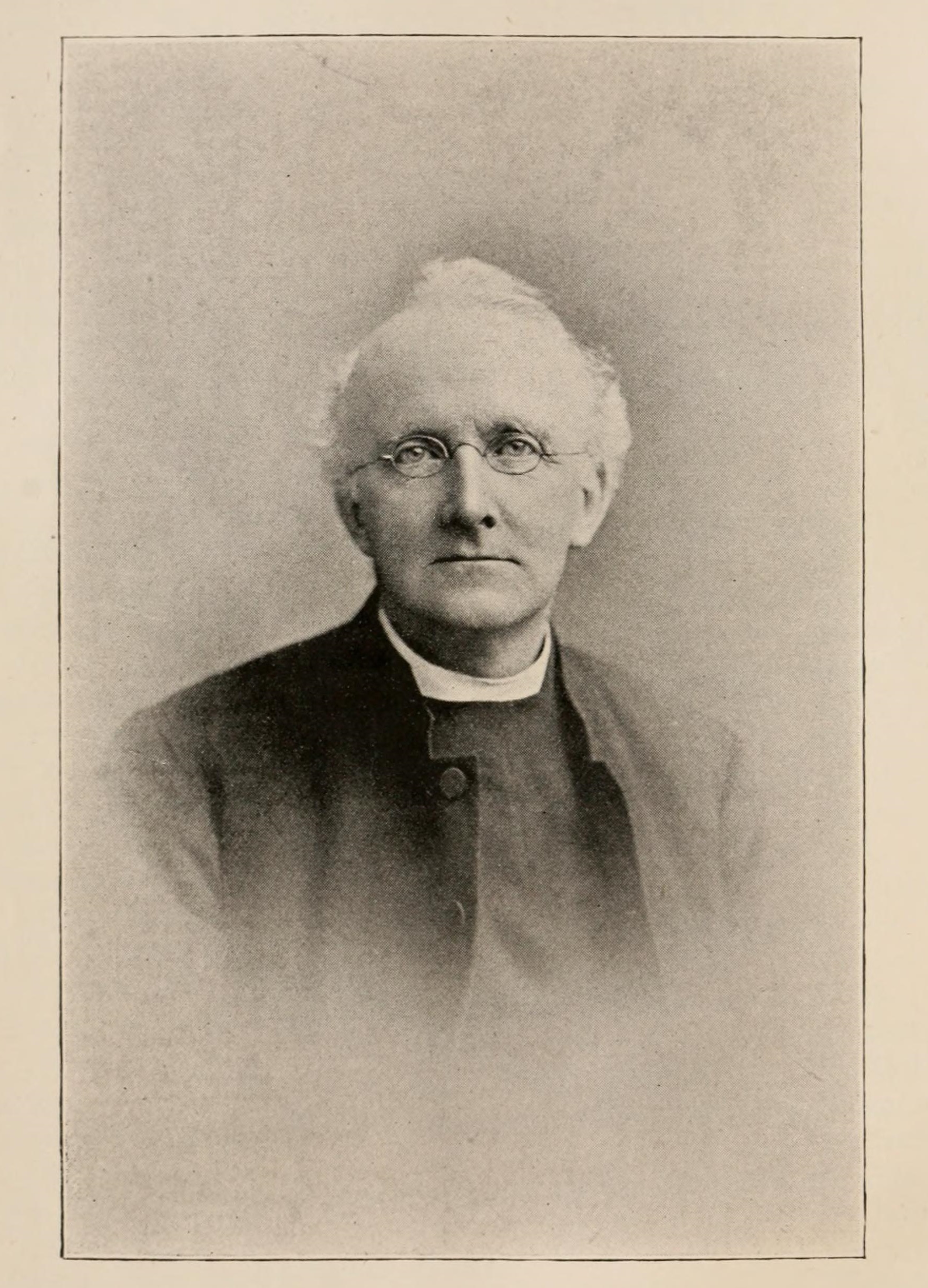
- Born: 21 December 1821; Carlow, County Carlow, Ireland
- Died: 31 October 1897 (aged 75); Dublin, Ireland
- Resting place: Killeshin Church of Ireland cemetery, Carlow
- Relatives: James Haughton (uncle)

Samuel Haughton (21 December 1821 – 31 October 1897) was an Irish clergyman, medical doctor, and scientific writer.

== Biography ==
The scientist Samuel Haughton was born in Carlow, the son of another Samuel Haughton (1786-1874) and grandson (by his second wife Jane Boake) of the three-times-married Samuel Pearson Haughton (1748-1828), a Quaker.

Samuel Pearson Haughton was also father, by his third wife Mary Pim, of James "Vegetable" Haughton (1795–1873), a Unitarian, an active philanthropist, a strong supporter of Father Theobald Mathew, a vegetarian, and an anti-slavery worker and writer.

The scientist Samuel Haughton had a distinguished career in Trinity College Dublin and in 1844 he was elected a fellow. Working on mathematical models under James MacCullagh, he was awarded in 1848 the Cunningham Medal by the Royal Irish Academy. In 1847 he had his ordination to the priesthood but he was not someone who preached. He was appointed as professor of geology in Trinity College in 1851. He held the position for thirty years. Haughton began to study medicine in 1859. He earned his MD degree in 1862 from Trinity College Dublin.

Haughton became the registrar of the Medical School. He focused on improving the status of the school and representing the university on the General Medical Council from 1878 to 1896. In 1858 he was elected fellow of the Royal Society,. He gained honorary degrees from Oxford, Cambridge and Edinburgh. In Trinity College Dublin he moved the first-ever motion at the Academic Council to admit women to the University on 10 March 1880. He proposed that 'In the opinion of the Council, the time has come when the Degrees in Arts of the University should be opened to women, by examination, on the same terms as men' (Thomson, 2004). Haughton, through his work as Professor of Geology, and his involvement with the Royal Zoological Society had witnessed the enthusiasm and contribution of women in the natural sciences. Although thwarted by opponents on the Council he continued to campaign for the admission of women to TCD until his death in 1897. It was 1902 before his motion was finally passed, 5 years after his death.

In 1866, Haughton developed the original equations for hanging as a humane method of execution, whereby the neck was broken at the time of the drop, so that the condemned person did not slowly strangle to death. "On hanging considered from a Mechanical and Physiological point of view" was published in the London, Edinburgh, and Dublin Philosophical Magazine and Journal of Science, Vol. 32 No. 213 (July 1866), calling for a drop energy of 2,240 ft-lbs. From 1886 to 1888, he served as a member of the Capital Sentences Committee, the report of which suggested a Table of Drops based on 1,260 ft-lbs of energy.

Haughton wrote papers on many subjects for journals in London and Dublin. His topics included the laws of equilibrium, the motion of solid and fluid bodies, sun-heat, radiation, climates and tides. His papers covered the granites of Leinster and Donegal and the cleavage and joint-planes of the Old Red Sandstone of Waterford.

Haughton was president of the Royal Irish Academy from 1886 to 1891, and secretary of the Royal Zoological Society of Ireland for twenty years. In 1880 he gave the Croonian Lecture on animal mechanics to the Royal Society.

Samuel Haughton was also involved in the Dublin and Kingstown Railway company, in which he looked after the building of the first locomotives. It was the first railway company in the world to build its own locomotives.

== Criticism of Darwin ==
"Haughton has the dubious honour of being the first person to comment on Darwin's theory when the joint papers of Darwin and Alfred Russel Wallace were read to the Linnean Society of London in 1858. They were presented by Darwin's close allies, the geologist Charles Lyell and the botanist Joseph Dalton Hooker. Haughton presumably saw the printed version of the papers and attacked the theory briefly in remarks made to the Geological Society of Dublin on 9 February 1859. These were reported in the society's journal, and a clipping of this found its way into Darwin's possession. Haughton wrote:

This speculation of Mess. Darwin and Wallace would not be worthy of note were it not for the weight of authority of the names under whose auspices it has been brought forward. If it means what it says, it is a truism; if it means anything more, it is contrary to fact.

Darwin later commented in his autobiography that this was the only response to the papers, summarising Haughton’s verdict as ‘all that [was] new in there was false, and what was true was old'."

In an anonymous article written in 1860 in the Natural History Review, Haughton set out his opinion that Darwin's theory was founded almost entirely upon speculation but also that this speculative theory belonged originally to Lamarck and that the differences between the two men's work were negligible.

to establish a character for subtlety and skill, in drawing large conclusions on this subject from slender premises, the first requisite is, ignorance of what other speculators have attempted before us in the same field: and the second is, a firm confidence in our own special theory. Neither of these requisites can be considered wanting in those who are engaged in the task of reproducing Lamarck’s theory of organic life, either as altogether new, or with but a tattered threadbare cloak, thrown over its original nakedness.

== Theistic evolution ==
Haughton's work on animal mechanics led him to believe that the structure of species was designed by an intelligent creator. In his book Animal Mechanics (1873, page 238) he commented that the "Framer of the Universe" had designed all muscles so they could perform the maximum work possible under given external conditions.

In the preface to his book, he was open to the possibility of "teleological evolution". Evolution was governed by a "Divine mind" and nothing was left to chance.

== Legacy ==
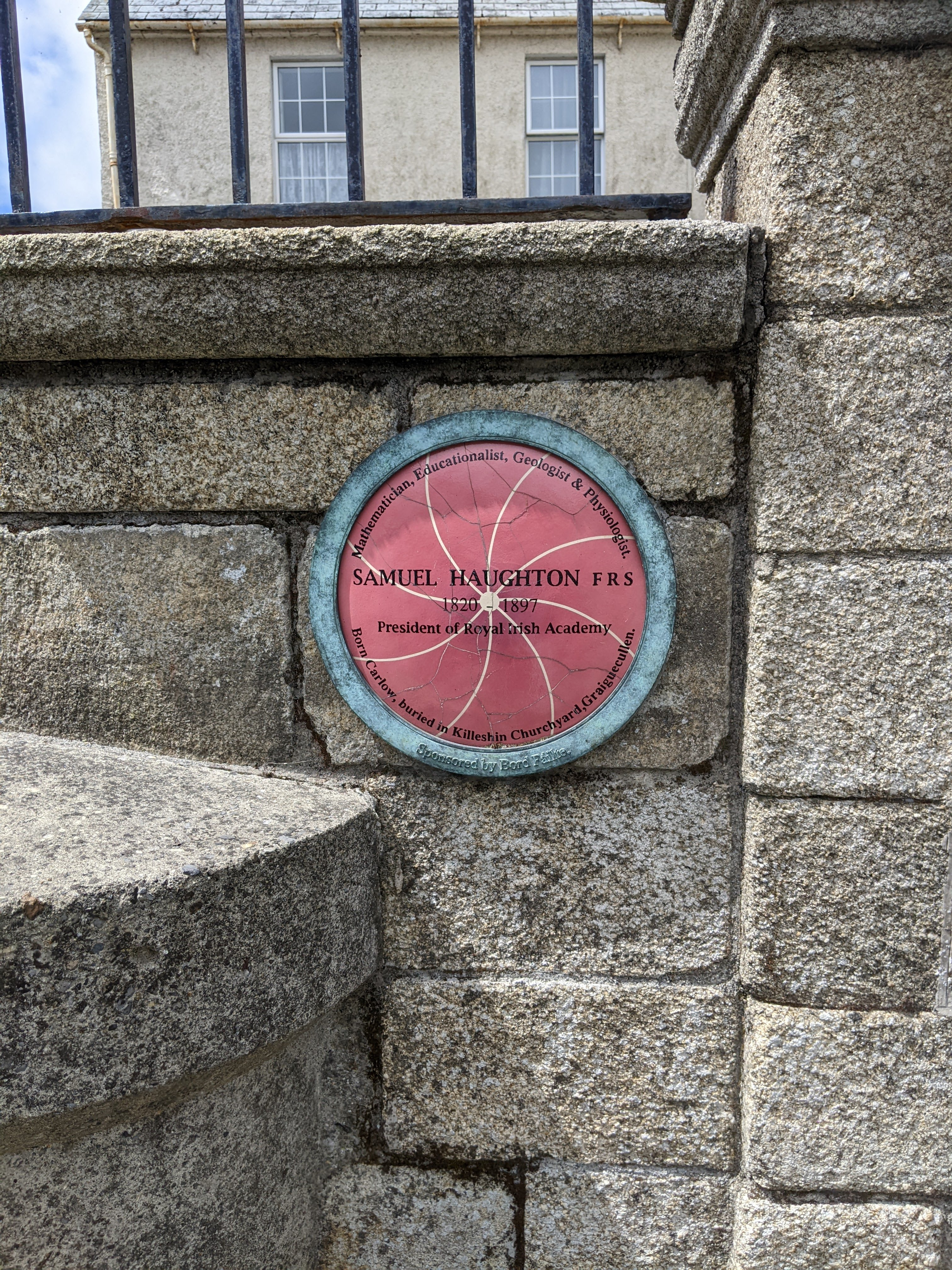
Plaque to Haughton in Carlow

In 2005, a plaque was erected by the National Committee for Science and Engineering Commemorative Plaques to Haughton outside his family home near Burrin Bridge in Carlow.

== Publications ==
- Manual of Geology (1865)
- Principles of Animal Mechanics (1873)
- Six Lectures on Physical Geography (1880)

In conjunction with his friend, Joseph Allen Galbraith, he issued a series of Manuals of Mathematical and Physical Science.
