= Matthew Young (bishop) =

Irish mathematician and natural philosopher

Matthew Young (1750–1800), Bishop of Clonfert and Kilmacduagh, was an eminent Irish mathematician and natural philosopher, and was Erasmus Smith's Professor of Natural and Experimental Philosophy (1786–1799). He was Bishop of Clonfert at the very end of his life.

== Biography ==
He was born in Castlerea, County Roscommon in 1750, entered Trinity College Dublin (TCD) in 1766, and was elected Fellow and took orders in 1775. He became Erasmus Smith's Professor of Natural and Experimental Philosophy at TCD in 1786. In 1798 the bishopric of Clonfert and Kilmacduagh was most unexpectedly conferred upon him by Lord Cornwallis. He was also a musician, an enthusiastic botanist, and somewhat of an artist.

The Gentleman's Magazine says: "The versatility of his talents, the acuteness of his intellect, and his intense application to study were happily blended with a native unassuming modesty, a simplicity of manners, unaffected, and infinitely engaging; a cheerfulness and vivacity; … a firm and inflexible spirit of honour and integrity."

One of the pleasures he hoped to derive from a country residence, on his appointment to the bishopric, was the opportunity to pursue his botanical studies; but shortly after his elevation, symptoms of cancer developed themselves. During his terminal illness, he continued his studies with great activity, revising his works for the press, and even studying Syriac for the purpose of editing a new version of the Psalms. He died at Whitworth, in Lancashire, 28 November 1800, aged 50. Bishop Young contributed largely to the Transactions of the Royal Irish Academy, of which he was one of the earliest members, and left some mathematical treatises in manuscript.

== Marriage ==
Young married Anne, daughter of Captain Bennet Cuthbertson, and left several children.

== Selected books ==
- An Enquiry into the Principal Phenomena of Sounds and Musical Strings (Robinson, 1784)
- An Analysis of the Principles of Natural Philosophy (Dublin University Press, 1800)
