= James Haughton (reformer) =

Irish social reformer (1795–1873)

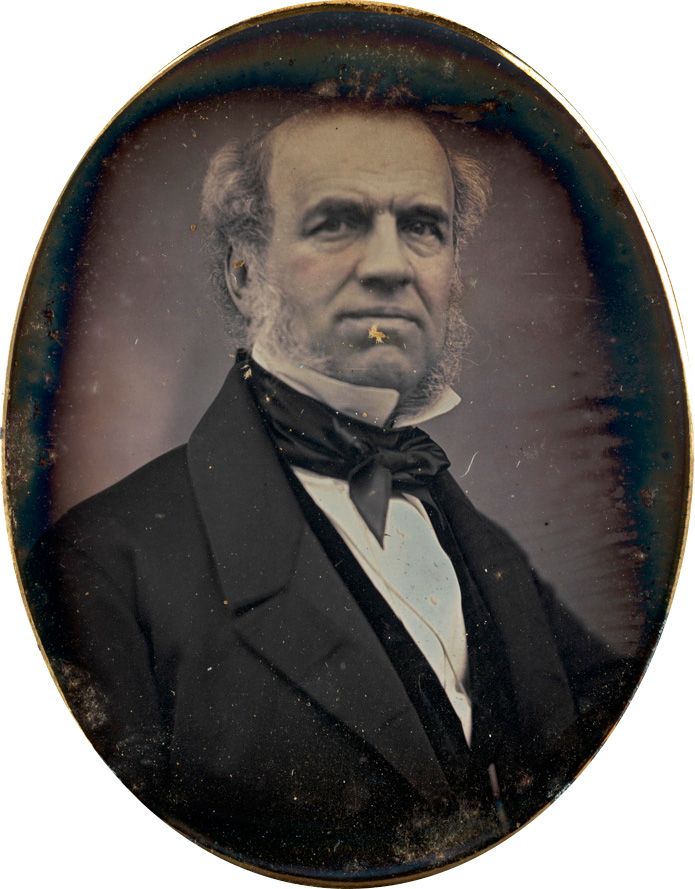
- Daguerreotype of James Haughton c. 1846
- Born: 5 May 1795; Carlow, County Carlow, Ireland
- Died: 20 February 1873 (aged 77); Dublin, Ireland
- Resting place: Mount Jerome Cemetery
- Other name: Vegetable Haughton
- Occupations: Social reformer, activist
- Known for: Vegetarianism activism
- Title: President of the Vegetarian Society
- Term: 1870–1873
- Predecessor: William Harvey
- Successor: Francis William Newman
- Relatives: Samuel Haughton (nephew)

James Haughton (5 May 1795 – 20 February 1873), nicknamed Vegetable Haughton, was an Irish social reformer, supporter of Irish self-government, abolitionist, and campaigning teetotaller and vegetarian. He served as President of the Vegetarian Society from 1870 to 1873.

== Biography ==
=== Early life and education ===
James Haughton, son of Samuel Pearson Haughton (1748–1828), by Mary, daughter of James Pim of Rushin, Queen's County (now County Laois), Ireland, was born in Carlow and educated at Ballitore, County Kildare, from 1807 to 1810, under James White, a Quaker. Although educated as a Friend, he joined the Unitarians in 1834, and remained throughout his life a strong believer in their tenets.

=== Career ===
After filling several situations to learn his business, in 1817 Haughton settled in Dublin, where he became a corn and flour agent, in partnership with his brother William. He retired in 1850.

=== Activism ===
Haughton supported the anti-slavery movement at an early period and took an active part in it until 1838, going in that year to London as a delegate to a convention. Shortly after the temperance campaigner, Father Mathew, took the pledge, 10 April 1838, Haughton became one of his most devoted disciples. For many years he gave most of his time and energies to promoting total abstinence and to advocating legislative restrictions on the sale of intoxicating drinks.

In December 1844 he was the chief promoter of a fund which was raised to pay some of the debts of Father Mathew and release him from prison. About 1835 he commenced a series of letters in the public press which made his name widely known. He wrote on temperance, slavery, British India, peace, capital punishment, sanitary reform, and education. His first letters were signed ‘The Son of a Water Drinker,’ but he soon commenced using his own name and continued to write till 1872. He took a leading part in a series of weekly meetings which were held in Dublin in 1840, when so numerous were the social questions discussed that a newspaper editor called the speakers the "Anti-everythingarians". In association with Daniel O'Connell, of whose character he had a very high opinion, he advocated various plans for the amelioration of the condition of Ireland and the Repeal of the Union, but was always opposed to physical force.

When in July 1846 O'Connell's son John forced a division the increasingly impatient "Young Irelanders" within his father's Repeal Association by tabling resolutions that repudiated political violence under circumstances, Haughton sought to mediate. In a decision perhaps made easier by Daniel O'Connell's death in May 1847, he ultimately sided with the dissidents: Thomas Meagher argued that the Young Irelanders were not advocating physical force, but might regard a resort to arms as "a no less honourable course" if Repeal could not be carried by moral persuasion. Haughton, however, resigned in turn from the new Irish Confederation in protest against a letter of thanks to US Vice-President George Mifflin Dallas which had failed to note and condemn Dallas's ownership of slaves.

Haughton was one of the first members of the Statistical Society of Dublin, 1847, a founder of the Dublin Mechanics' Institute, 1849, in the same year was on the committee of the Dublin Peace Society, aided in abolishing Donnybrook Fair 1855, and took a chief part in 1861 in opening the Botanic Gardens at Glasnevin on Sundays.

=== Death and legacy ===
Haughton died at 35 Eccles Street, Dublin, on 20 February 1873, and was buried in Mount Jerome Cemetery on 24 February in the presence of an immense crowd of people.

Haughton's son, Samuel published a memoir of his father's life including extracts from his public correspondence in 1877. The scientist Samuel Haughton was a half nephew of James Haughton, who was the second son of another Samuel Haughton (1786–1874), who in turn was the son of Samuel Pearson Haughton and his second wife, Jane Boake.

== Vegetarianism ==
Haughton became a vegetarian in 1846, both on moral and sanitary grounds. From 1870 to 1873 he served as President of the Vegetarian Society.

== Publications ==
- Slavery Immoral, 1847
- A Memoir of Thomas Clarkson, 1847
- "On death punishments: a paper read before the Dublin Statistical Society". Journal of the Statistical and Social Inquiry Society of Ireland. Dublin: Statistical and Social Inquiry Society of Ireland. 1850. hdl:2262/7759. ISSN 0081-4776. Wikidata Q28925851.
- A Plea for Teetotalism and the Maine Liquor Law, 1855
- "The Social and Moral Elevation of our Working Classes". Journal of the Statistical and Social Inquiry Society of Ireland. 2 (9). Statistical and Social Inquiry Society of Ireland: 63–72. 1857. hdl:2262/9178. ISSN 0081-4776. Wikidata Q28932701.
