= Timothy Cunningham =

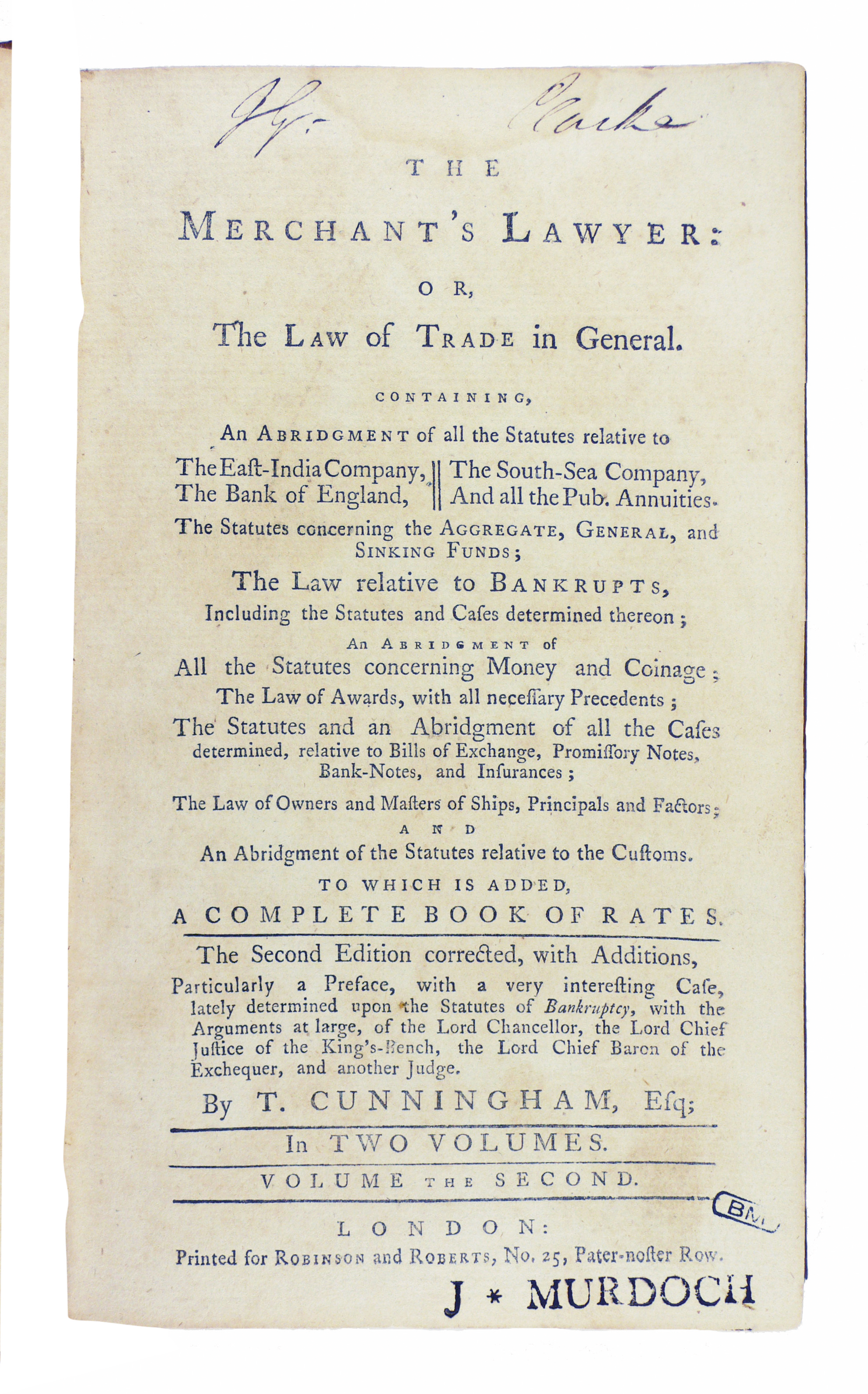
The merchant's lawyer, 1768.

Timothy Cunningham (died 1789) was a London barrister, legal writer and antiquarian, thought to have been Irish.

== Life ==
A member of the Middle Temple, Cunningham lived in chambers at Gray's Inn for over thirty years. In 1759 he asked for employment as copyist at the British Museum from John Burton, proving in fact expensive.

Cunningham was elected a Fellow of the Society of Antiquaries of London on 29 January 1761, and a testimonial for his admission to the Royal Society that year failed, despite supporters including Richard Pococke and Charles Morton. He died at Gray's Inn during April 1789.

== Legacy ==
The Cunningham prize (awarded as the Cunningham Medal) of the Royal Irish Academy was founded with his legacy of £1,000: for the encouragement of learning in Ireland by the bestowal of prizes on literary or scientific works of distinguished merit.

== Works ==
Cunningham was the author and compiler of legal and antiquarian books, including:

- A New Treatise on the Laws concerning Tithes, 3rd ed. 1748, 4th ed. 1777.
- The Practice of a Justice of Peace, 1762.
- A New and Complete Law Dictionary, 2 vols. 1764–5, 3rd ed. 1782–3.
- The History of the Customs, Aids, Subsidies, National Debts, and Taxes of England, 1764, 3rd ed. 1778.
- History and Antiquities of the Inns of Court and Chancery, 1780 and 1790.
- An Historical Account of the Rights of Election, 1783.

== Notes ==
Attribution

This article incorporates text from a publication now in the public domain: Stephen, Leslie, ed. (1888). "Cunningham, Timothy". Dictionary of National Biography. Vol. 13. London: Smith, Elder & Co.
