= Humphrey Lloyd (physicist) =

Irish physicist and academic administrator

Humphrey Lloyd FRS FRSE PRIA
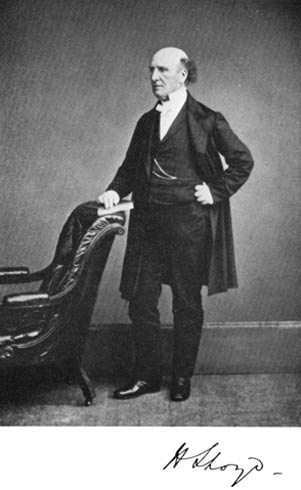

30th Provost of Trinity College Dublin
- In office 24 February 1867 – 17 January 1881
- Preceded by: Richard MacDonnell
- Succeeded by: John Hewitt Jellett

President of the Royal Irish Academy
- In office 11 June 1846 – 21 May 1851
- Preceded by: William Rowan Hamilton
- Succeeded by: Thomas Romney Robinson

Personal details
- Born: 16 April 1800 Dublin, Ireland
- Died: 17 January 1881 (aged 80) Dublin, Ireland
- Spouse: Dorothea Bulwer (m. 1840)
- Education: Trinity College Dublin (B.A., M.A., D.D.)
- Known for: Lloyd's mirror
- Awards: FRS (1836); Cunningham Medal (1862); Pour le Mérite (1874)
- Scientific career
- Fields: Physics
- Workplaces: Trinity College Dublin

Humphrey Lloyd FRS FRSE PRIA (16 April 1800 – 17 January 1881) was an Irish physicist and academic who served as the 30th Provost of Trinity College Dublin from 1867 to 1881. He was Erasmus Smith's Professor of Natural and Experimental Philosophy at Trinity College Dublin from 1831 to 1843. Lloyd is known for experimentally verifying conical refraction, a theoretical prediction made by William Rowan Hamilton about the way light is bent when travelling through a biaxial crystal. He was a Fellow of the Royal Society, and President of both the British Association and the Royal Irish Academy.

Humphrey carried out the Lloyd's mirror optic experiments, and was a member of numerous societies in Europe and North America. He also published works relating to religion and the religious identities of Ireland.

== Early life ==
The eldest son of the Very Rev. Bartholomew Lloyd, and his wife, Eleanor McLaughlin, he was born in Dublin on 16 April 1800. His father had also served as Erasmus Smith's Professor of Natural and Experimental Philosophy and Provost of Trinity College.

After early education at Mr. White's school in Dublin, he entered Trinity College Dublin in 1815, first out of 63 competitors in the entrance examination. He was elected a Scholar in 1818, and graduated B.A. in 1819, taking first place and the gold medal for science, and proceeding M.A. in 1827, and D.D. in 1840. He became a junior fellow in 1824, and a senior fellow in 1843.

== Scientific career ==
Lloyd in 1831 succeeded his father as Erasmus Smith's Professor of Natural and Experimental Philosophy. At the meeting of the British Association in 1833, he spoke on his establishment by experiment of the existence of conical refraction in biaxial crystals, in conformity with the theory of William Rowan Hamilton. He also succeeded in establishing experimentally the law by which the polarisation of the rays composing the luminous cone is governed. Shortly after, by means of an experiment on the interference of light proceeding directly from a luminous source, with light coming from the same source but reflected at a very high angle of incidence from a plane surface, he contributed to the theory of reflected light. A letter from Sir David Brewster led him to turn his attention to the phenomena of light incident on thin plates. In 1841, he submitted a communication on the subject to the British Association, and in 1859, he described his investigation of the phenomena to the Royal Irish Academy (see Transactions, vol. xxiv.)

When the magnetic observatory of Trinity College Dublin, was established under the auspices of his father, it was placed in Lloyd's charge, and the instruments for it were devised by him and constructed under his superintendence. He was a member of the committee of the British Association lobbying government to improve knowledge of terrestrial magnetism by establishing observing stations. He prepared the instructions for the observatories, and the officers appointed to take charge of them were trained by him in Dublin.

== Later life ==
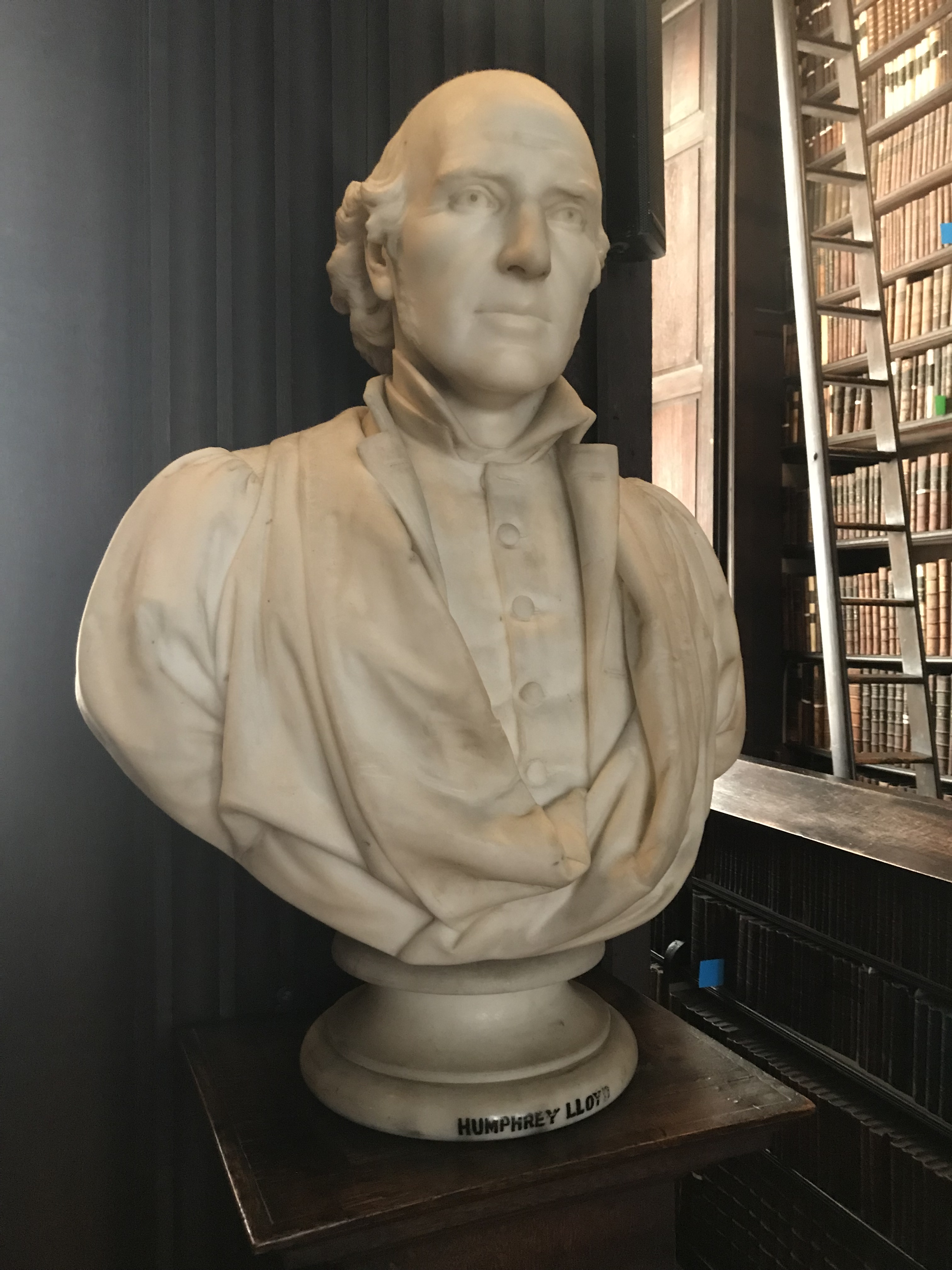
Bust of Humphrey Lloyd on display in the Long Room in TCD

From 1846 to 1851, Lloyd was president of the Royal Irish Academy, who in 1862 awarded him their Cunningham gold medal. He resigned his chair of natural philosophy in 1843, on his accession to a senior fellowship in Trinity College. In 1862, he became vice-provost, and in 1867, was appointed provost, in succession to Provost Richard MacDonnell. He was president of the British Association in 1857, when it met in Dublin, and delivered an inaugural address, which was published, in which he gave a sketch of the recent progress made in astronomy, terrestrial magnetism, and other branches of science.

Lloyd was a leading member of the general synod of the Irish church which came into existence on Irish disestablishment, and took part in its committee for the revision of the prayer-book. He died in the provost's house, Dublin, 17 January 1881.

== Awards and honours ==
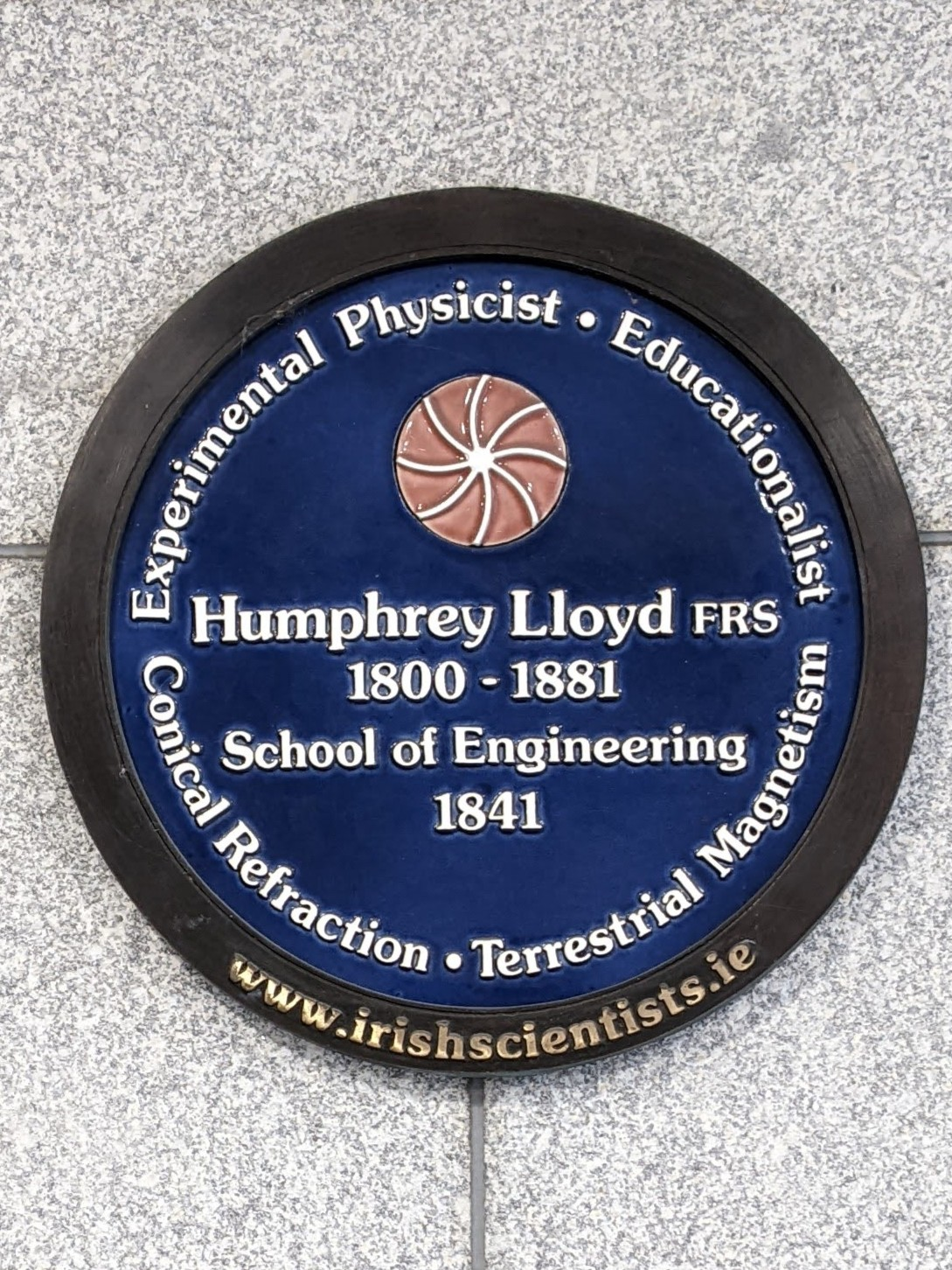
Plaque to Humphrey Lloyd on the Lloyd Building, TCD

Lloyd was a fellow of the Royal Societies of London and Edinburgh, and an honorary member of many other learned societies of Europe and America. He was elected as a member to the American Philosophical Society in 1839. In 1855 the university of Oxford conferred on him the degree of D.C.L., and in 1874 the emperor of Germany the order Pour le Mérite. A bust of him, by Albert Bruce Joy, was placed in the library of Trinity College in 1892.

The School of Physics in Trinity is called the Lloyd Building, and a plaque from the National Committee for Commemorative Plaques in Science and Technology was erected to him on the building in 2016.

== Works ==
In 1834, Lloyd furnished the British Association, at its request, with a report on The Progress and Present State of Physical Optics (see Report for 1834). Papers which he wrote on terrestrial magnetism and other subjects are in the Reports of the British Association and in the Transactions and Proceedings of the Royal Irish Academy. Besides tracts, his other published works were:

- A Treatise on Light and Vision, London, 1831.
- Two Introductory Lectures on Physical and Mechanical Science, London, 1834.
- Lectures on the Wave-theory of Light, two parts, Dublin, 1836 and 1841; republished, London, 1857, as Elementary Treatise on the Wave-theory of Light.
- Account of the Magnetic Observatory at Dublin, and of the Instruments and Methods of Observation employed there, London, 1842.
- An Account of the Method of Determining the Total Intensity of the Earth's Magnetic Force in Absolute Measure, London, 1848.
- The Elements of Optics, Dublin, 1849.
- Address delivered at the opening meeting of the British Association for the Advancement of Science, held at Dublin 26 Aug 1857, Dublin, 1857.
- Is it a Sin? An Inquiry into the Lawfulness of Complying with the Rule of the National Board relative to Religious Instruction, published anonymously, Dublin, 1860.
- The Climate of Ireland and the Currents of the Atlantic, a lecture, Dublin, 1865.
- Observations made at the Magnetical and Meteorological Observatory at Trinity College, Dublin, Dublin, 1865.
- The University of Dublin in its Relations to the several Religious Communities, anonymous, Dublin, 1868.
- The Doctrine of Absolutism, Dublin, 1871.
- Treatise on Magnetism, General and Terrestrial, London, 1874.
- Miscellaneous Papers connected with Physical Science, London, 1877.

== Family ==
Lloyd married, in July 1840, Dorothea, only daughter of the Very Rev. James Bulwer, rector of Hunworth-cum-Stody, Norfolk. He had no children.

== See also ==
- Physical crystallography before X-rays

== Notes ==
Academic offices
Preceded by Richard MacDonnell	Provost of Trinity College Dublin; 1867–1881	Succeeded by John Hewitt Jellett
