= Dervilla M. X. Donnelly =

Irish chemist (1930–2024)

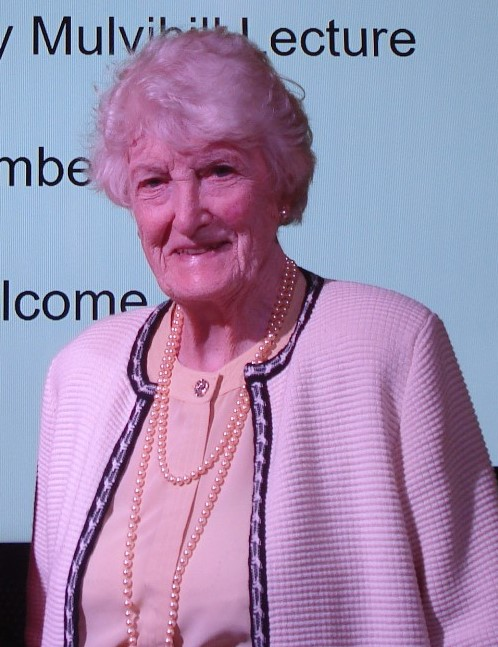
- Donnelly in 2017
- Born: Dervilla Maura Xavier Donnelly; 1930; Dublin, Ireland
- Died: 14 November 2024 (aged 94); Dublin, Ireland
- Occupation: Professor

Academic background
- Education: University College Dublin
- Doctoral advisor: T. S. Wheeler

Academic work
- Institutions: University College Dublin
- Main interests: Phytochemistry

Dervilla Maura Xavier Donnelly (1930 – 14 November 2024) was an Irish chemist who was Professor of Phytochemistry at University College Dublin. She was the first woman to receive the Cunningham Medal from the Royal Irish Academy and was recognised by WITS (Women in Technology and Science) with their inaugural Lifetime Achievement award.

== Early life and education ==
Dervilla Maura Xavier Donnelly was born in Dublin in 1930. She studied chemistry at University College Dublin as an undergraduate and went on to complete her PhD there under the supervision of T. S. Wheeler. She pursued postdoctoral studies at UCLA.

== Academic career ==
Donnelly was appointed lecturer in chemistry at UCD in 1956, where she specialised in Phytochemistry. She was appointed Professor of Phytochemistry in 1979. Her research in the area of wood chemistry was of particular interest to the forestry industry in Ireland and she was able to apply her findings to a number of complex problems in Irish forestry. She also developed international collaborations with researchers in France. During her academic career she supervised more than 80 PhD students.

== Appointments ==
Donnelly was elected to membership of The Royal Irish Academy 1968 and she served three times as vice-president of the academy. She was president of the Institute of Chemistry of Ireland from 1994 to 1996.

In December 1989, Dervilla Donnelly was elected the first woman President of the Royal Dublin Society, a position she held for three years. She was the first woman elected to the position after 258 years of male presidents. She had been involved in the RDS since the 1960s, was elected to the science committee in 1976 and to the council in 1985. She succeeded Francis O'Reilly as president, who also nominated her as his successor.

In 1995, she was appointed chair of the council of the Dublin Institute for Advanced Studies, by Niamh Bhreathneach who was Minister for Education at the time. She retained this appointment for 15 years until 2010.

== Later life and death ==
In 2012, Donnelly was one of five "inspiring women" interviewed for a video made by WITS. Inspiring Women Interviews was launched on International Women's Day at the European Parliament office in Dublin. It aims to encourage 16+ year old girls to consider careers in STEM.

Donnelly was listed as one of 100 top women in science, technology, engineering and maths by Silicon Republic as part of their Women Invent Tomorrow campaign in March 2014.

Donnelly died at St. James's Hospital on 14 November 2024, at the age of 94.

== Awards ==
Donnelly was awarded UCD's Charter Day medal in December 2000, for her contribution to the country and the university. In the same year she received the Boyle-Higgins gold medal award from the Institute of Chemistry of Ireland, awarded for "an outstanding and internationally recognised research contribution to the advancement of chemistry".

The Women in Science and Technology (WITS) inaugural Lifetime Achievement award was presented to Professor Donnelly in June 2011.

In 2017 Professor Donnelly became the first woman to receive the Royal Irish Academy's highest honour, the Cunningham Medal, which recognises "outstanding contributions to scholarship and the objectives of the Academy".
