= James Apjohn =

Irish chemist (1796-1886)

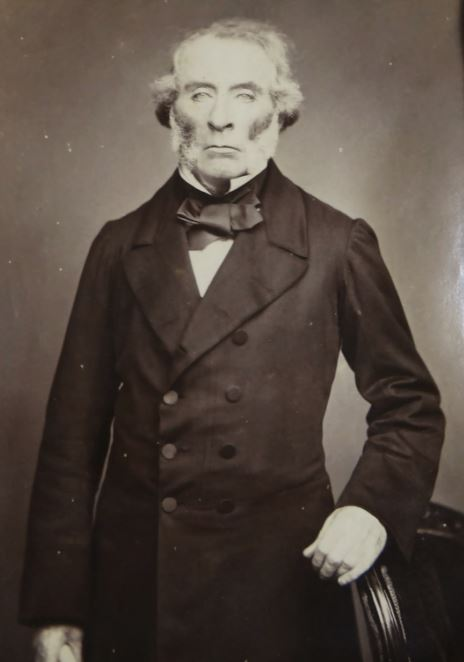
- Born: 1 September 1796; Sunville, Limerick Ireland
- Died: 2 June 1886 (aged 89); Southill, Blackrock Ireland
- Education: Trinity College, Dublin
- Known for: Discovery of the mineral Apjohnite
- Scientific career
- Workplaces: RCSI, Trinity College, Dublin

James Apjohn FRS (1 September 1796 – 2 June 1886) was the Irish chemist known for the discovery of new minerals.

== Life ==
Apjohn was a renowned and respected chemist and physicist who lived and worked in Dublin during the 1800s. He was known internationally for his work on hygrometry and the Apjohn dewpoint. A mineral from Algoa Bay, South Africa, which proved to be an effloresced manganese alum was analysed and described by Apjohn to great acclaim. Subsequently, it was named 'Apjohnite' in his honour.

Apjohn was born on 1 September 1796 at his father's property, Sunville, in Pallasgrean, Co. Limerick. He attended the Tipperary Grammar School for four years before entering Trinity College Dublin in 1813 as a sizar under the tutorship of Rev. Dr. Wall. Apjohn graduated with a B.A in 1817 and took his degree of M.B in 1821.

His debút as a lecturer on science took place in the Royal Cork Institution in 1824 where he succeeded Edmund Davy as Professor of Chemistry after which went on to become the Professor of Chemistry at the Royal College of Surgeons of Ireland. He continued lecturing throughout his career and was popular for his lucid style and well-devised experiments. In some cases, his lectures were so well attended that a larger venue had to be found to accommodate all those wishing to attend.

Many of the greatest names in Irish medicine were connected with this school and by some, it was seen as a 'nursery' for RCSI professors. Apjohn was appointed Lecturer in Chemistry and stayed in that position until 1828 when he was elected Professor of Chemistry in the RCSI. He held this professorship which was created with his appointment for 22 years. Apjohn became a licentiate of the Royal College of Physicians in 1829 and a Fellow in 1831.

Throughout his career, Apjohn was associated with the Royal Irish Academy (RIA). He regularly submitted papers on chemistry, electricity, mineralogy etc. to the RIA's proceedings. The year 1837 was to be an important one for Apjohn. Not only did he qualify as M.D from Trinity but he was also awarded the Cunningham Medal by the Royal Irish Academy for his paper 'Upon a New Method of Investigating the Specific Heat of Gases'. This is the highest honour the institute can bestow. As stated on the RIA website

The Cunningham Medal is considered to be the Academy's premier award established to recognise the outstanding contribution to scholarship and the objectives of the Academy by a Member. It is awarded at three-yearly intervals...

In 1841 he was appointed Lecturer on Applied Chemistry in Trinity. Nearly a decade later on the death of Dr. F.Barker, Apjohn was made Chair of Chemistry. On 2 June 1853 he was elected Fellow of the Royal Society. By 1855 the Professorship of Mineralogy was amalgamated into this Chair. Apjohn published a Manuel of Metalloids in 1864 which was widely received by scientists of the time. During his time in Trinity he represented the College on the General Medical Council. He finally retired from lecturing at the age of 78.

James Apjohn died in Blackrock, County Dublin on 3 June 1886 at the age of 91.
