= Franc Sadleir =

Irish academic (1775-1851)

The Reverend Franc Sadleir
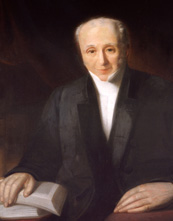

28th Provost of Trinity College Dublin
- In office 1 August 1837 – 11 May 1851
- Preceded by: Bartholomew Lloyd
- Succeeded by: Richard MacDonnell

Personal details
- Born: 13 June 1775 Cork, Ireland
- Died: 11 May 1851 (aged 75) Dublin, Ireland
- Resting place: Trinity College Chapel
- Party: Whig
- Spouse: Letitia Grave (m. 1813)
- Children: 5
- Education: Trinity College, Dublin (B.A., 1795; M.A., 1805; B.D., 1812; D.D., 1813)

Franc Sadleir [formerly Francis] (13 June 1775 – 11 May 1851) was an Irish academic who served as the 28th Provost of Trinity College Dublin from 1837 to 1851.

== Early life and education ==
Sadleir was the youngest son of Thomas Sadleir, barrister, by his first wife, Rebecca, eldest daughter of William Woodward of Clough Prior, County Tipperary. He was educated at Trinity College Dublin, where he was elected a Scholar in 1794 and a fellow in 1805. He graduated B.A. 1795, M.A. 1805, B.D. and D.D. 1813.

== Academic career ==
In 1816, 1817, and 1823 he was Donnellan lecturer at his college; from 1825 to 1835 Erasmus Smith's Professor of Mathematics, and from 1833 to 1838 Regius Professor of Greek.

In politics, he was a Whig and an advocate of Catholic emancipation. With the Duke of Leinster, the archbishop of Dublin, and others, he was one of the first commissioners to administer funds for the education of the poor in Ireland in 1831.

In 1833, he was appointed, with the Primate, the Lord Chancellor, and other dignitaries, a commissioner to alter and amend the laws relating to the temporalities of the Church of Ireland, but resigned the trust in 1837. On 22 Dec. of that year, during the viceroyalty of the Marquis of Normanby, he was made Provost of Trinity College, a post he held for fourteen years. He is said to have declined a bishopric on more than one occasion. He upheld the principle of the Queen's Colleges in Ireland.

One of the treasures of the Library at Trinity College was given to it by Sadleir in 1837. This is the 14th-century manuscript called the "Dublin Apocalypse".

== Later and personal life ==
Sadleir died at Castle Knock Glebe, County Dublin, on 14 December 1851 and was buried in the vaults of Trinity College on 18 December. He married Letitia, daughter of Joseph Grave of Ballycommon, King's County, by whom he left five children. There is a portrait of Sadleir in the Provost's House, Trinity College Dublin.

== Publications ==
Sadleir published Sermons and Lectures preached in the Chapel of Trinity College, Dublin, 1821–4, 3 vols.; and National Schools for Ireland defended in a Letter to Dr. Thorpe, 1835.

Academic offices
Preceded by Bartholomew Lloyd	Provost of Trinity College Dublin; 1837–1851	Succeeded by Richard MacDonnell
