= Lloyd's mirror =

Optical setup to obtain interference pattern by reflection

Lloyd's mirror is an optics experiment that was first described in 1834 by Humphrey Lloyd in the Transactions of the Royal Irish Academy. Its original goal was to provide further evidence for the wave nature of light, beyond those provided by Thomas Young and Augustin-Jean Fresnel. In the experiment, light from a monochromatic slit source reflects from a glass surface at a small angle and appears to come from a virtual source as a result. The reflected light interferes with the direct light from the source, forming interference fringes. It is the optical wave analogue to a sea interferometer.

== Setup ==
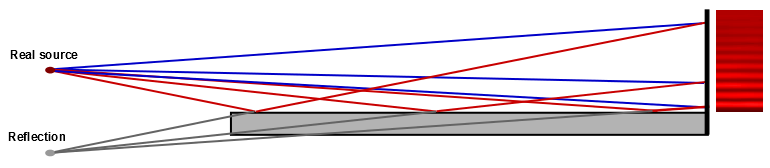
Figure 1. Lloyd's mirror

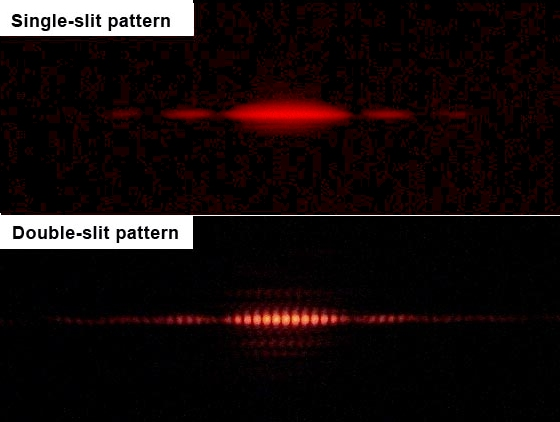
Figure 2. Young's two-slit experiment displays a single-slit diffraction pattern on top of the two-slit interference fringes.

Lloyd’s Mirror is used to produce two-source interference patterns that have important differences from the interference patterns seen in Young's experiment.

In a modern implementation of Lloyd's mirror, a diverging laser beam strikes a front-surface mirror at a grazing angle, so that some of the light travels directly to the screen (blue lines in Fig. 1), and some of the light reflects off the mirror to the screen (red lines). The reflected light forms a virtual second source that interferes with the direct light.

In Young's experiment, the individual slits display a diffraction pattern on top of which is overlaid interference fringes from the two slits (Fig. 2). In contrast, the Lloyd's mirror experiment does not use slits and displays two-source interference without the complications of an overlaid single-slit diffraction pattern.

In Young's experiment, the central fringe representing equal path length is bright because of constructive interference. In contrast, in Lloyd's mirror, the fringe nearest the mirror representing equal path length is dark rather than bright. This is because the light reflecting off the mirror undergoes a 180° phase shift, and so causes destructive interference when the path lengths are equal or when they differ by an integer number of wavelengths.

== Applications ==
=== Interference lithography ===
The most common application of Lloyd's mirror is in UV photolithography and nanopatterning. Lloyd's mirror has important advantages over double-slit interferometers.

If one wishes to create a series of closely spaced interference fringes using a double-slit interferometer, the spacing d between the slits must be increased. Increasing the slit spacing, however, requires that the input beam be broadened to cover both slits. This results in a large loss of power. In contrast, increasing d in the Lloyd's mirror technique does not result in power loss, since the second "slit" is just the reflected virtual image of the source. Hence, Lloyd's mirror enables the generation of finely detailed interference patterns of sufficient brightness for applications such as photolithography.

Typical uses of Lloyd's mirror photolithography would include fabrication of diffraction gratings for surface encoders and patterning the surfaces of medical implants for improved biofunctionality.

=== Test pattern generation ===
High visibility cos^{2}-modulated fringes of constant spatial frequency can be generated in a Lloyd's mirror arrangement using parallel collimated monochromatic light rather than a point or slit source. The uniform fringes generated by this arrangement can be used to measure the modulation transfer functions of optical detectors such as CCD arrays to characterize their performance as a function of spatial frequency, wavelength, intensity, and so forth.

=== Optical measurement ===
The output of a Lloyd's mirror was analyzed with a CCD photodiode array to produce a compact, broad range, high accuracy Fourier transform wavemeter that could be used to analyze the spectral output of pulsed lasers.

=== Radio astronomy ===
Figure 3. Determining the position of galactic radio sources using Lloyd's mirror

In the late 1940s and early 1950s, CSIRO scientists used a technique based on Lloyd's mirror to make accurate measurements of the position of various galactic radio sources from coastal sites in New Zealand and Australia. As illustrated in Fig. 3, the technique was to observe the sources combining direct and reflected rays from high cliffs overlooking the sea. After correcting for atmospheric refraction, these observations allowed the paths of the sources above the horizon to be plotted and their celestial coordinates to be determined.

=== Underwater acoustics ===
An acoustic source just below the water surface generates constructive and destructive interference between the direct path and reflected paths. This can have a major impact on sonar operations.

The Lloyd mirror effect has been implicated as having an important role in explaining why marine animals such as manatees and whales have been repeatedly hit by boats and ships. Interference due to Lloyd's mirror results in low frequency propeller sounds not being discernible near the surface, where most accidents occur. This is because at the surface, sound reflections are nearly 180 degrees out of phase with the incident waves. Combined with spreading and acoustic shadowing effects, the result is that the marine animal is unable to hear an approaching vessel before it has been run over or entrapped by the hydrodynamic forces of the vessel's passage.

== See also ==
- Multipath propagation
