= Landahaussy =

Coordinates: 54.762°N 7.246°W

Landahussy: Irish: Lann Uí Eoghasa
- Location within Northern Ireland
  - Belfast: 53 mi (85 km)
  - Dublin: 105 mi (169 km)
- District: Derry City and Strabane
- County: County Tyrone
- Country: Northern Ireland
- Sovereign state: United Kingdom
- Post town: OMAGH
- Postcode district: BT79
- Dialling code: 028
- Police: Northern Ireland
- Fire: Northern Ireland
- Ambulance: Northern Ireland
- UK Parliament: West Tyrone
- NI Assembly: West Tyrone

Landahaussy or Landahussy (possibly from Irish Lann Uí Eoghasa, meaning 'Ó Eoghasa's church') is a small village and townland near Plumbridge in County Tyrone, Northern Ireland. It is within the Derry City and Strabane District Council area.

== People ==
It is the birthplace of mathematician James MacCullagh.
