= Robert Vickers Dixon =

Irish academic and clergyman

Robert Vickers Dixon (born Dublin 22 October 1812; died Armagh 14 May 1885) was an Irish academic and clergyman who served as Erasmus Smith's Professor of Natural and Experimental Philosophy at Trinity College Dublin (TCD) from 1848 to 1853, and much later as Archdeacon of Armagh from 1883 to 1885.

== Career ==
Dixon was born in Dublin, son of Robert Dixon, and was educated at TCD, obtaining BA (1833), MA (1839), DD (1862). He was elected a Fellow of TCD in 1838, and in 1849, he published the book Treatise on Heat, Part 1: The Thermometer; Dilation; Change of State; And Laws of Vapours (Hodges and Smith, Dublin). In 1853 he left TCD, publishing "Scientific Training for Practical Pursuits: A Farewell Address to the Students of the School of Engineering, Trinity College, Dublin" (Hodges and Smith, 1854).

Having been ordained in 1839, in 1853 he became to Rector of Clogherny. Thirty years later he was appointed Archdeacon of Armagh, two years before his death.

His nephew Andrew Francis Dixon was a distinguished physician.
