= Joseph Allen Galbraith =

Irish mathematician and textbook writer

- Born: 29 November 1818; Dublin, Ireland
- Died: 20 October 1890 (aged 71)

Academic work
- Institutions: Trinity College Dublin

Joseph Allen Galbraith (29 November 1818 – 20 October 1890) was an Irish mathematician, academic and prolific textbook author, who spent his entire career at Trinity College Dublin (TCD). He was Erasmus Smith's Professor of Natural and Experimental Philosophy there from 1854 to 1870. He has been credited with coining the term "Home Rule".

== Life and career ==
Joseph Galbraith was born in Dublin, son of merchant Richard Galbraith and his wife Rebecca Allen. He was educated at TCD (BA 1840, MA and Fellow 1844), and taught there for 30 years. He co-authored 10 mathematics textbooks with his TCD colleague Samuel Haughton; they are credited with educating "a generation of Irishmen in technical issues that would make them skilled and employable."

In 1853, he joined the Council of the Dublin Statistical Society, and delivered a paper highlighting the advantages of a decimal currency system.

His interests were wide, and he published papers on geology and meteorology as well as on mathematics. He also successfully lobbied to have a TCD colleague dismissed for incompetence in his supposed area of expertise (the Italian language).

In 1880, he was elected Senior Fellow and Bursar, and in 1885 he became Registrar. As Bursar, he made substantial changes to college practices, whose system of accountancy was said to have been medieval.
