= Bernard Crossland =

British professor of engineering

Sir Bernard Crossland CBE (20 October 1923 – 17 January 2011) was a British professor of engineering with a career spanning some seven decades. He was made a Freeman of the City of London in 1987 and was knighted in 1990 for services to Northern Ireland.

== Life ==
Crossland was born in London, England. Upon leaving Simon Langton Grammar School for Boys in 1940 he gained employment as an engineering apprentice with Rolls-Royce, gaining his education through part-time study culminating in the award of a PhD from the University of Bristol in 1953.

His teaching career began at Luton Technical College in 1945, and, after teaching at Bristol University he became Professor of Mechanical Engineering at The Queen's University of Belfast, where he went on to serve as Pro-Vice Chancellor before his retirement in 1982. He was president of the Institution of Mechanical Engineers in 1986.

After retirement, Sir Bernard became involved in the investigation of several accidents, the most noteworthy of which was the King's Cross fire where he headed up the scientific committee which established the cause of the fire and made recommendations to prevent such a tragedy from occurring again.

In his later years, Sir Bernard served as an Emeritus Professor of Chemical Engineering at Queen's University of Belfast, where a building, housing the Computer Science department, was named after him until March 2017.

He was elected a Fellow of the Royal Society in 1979, appointed Commander of the Order of the British Empire in the 1980 Birthday Honours, and knighted in the 1990 Birthday Honours.

In 2001 he was awarded the Cunningham Medal of the Royal Irish Academy.

Professional and academic associations
Preceded by Sir Philip Foreman	President of the Institution of Mechanical Engineers; 1986	Succeeded by Oscar Roith
