= Caleb Cartwright =

Irish academic and clergyman

Caleb Cartwright (1696? – 25 August 1763) was an Irish academic and clergyman, who was the second Erasmus Smith's Professor of Natural and Experimental Philosophy at Trinity College Dublin (TCD), serving from 1738–1743.

== Life and career ==
Caleb Cartwright was born in Cork, the son of Charles Cartwright. He matriculated at TCD on 7 July 1716 at the age of 19. He received BA (1720), MA (1723) and DD (1735) from that institution. He was elected a Fellow in 1724, served as Donegall Lecturer in Mathematics (1735–1738), was appointed Senior Dean in 1737, and second Erasmus Smith's Professor of Natural and Experimental Philosophy (1738–1743). He resigned from TCD in 1743 and spent the rest of his life as a clergyman in the parish of Clonmethan, north Dublin.
