= Robert Ditchburn =

British physicist

Robert Ditchburn FRS MRIA
- Born: Robert William Ditchburn; 14 January 1903; Waterloo, England, UKGBI
- Died: 8 April 1987 (aged 84)
- Education: Bootle Grammar School; University of Liverpool (BSc); University of Cambridge (PhD)
- Title: Erasmus Smith's Professor of Natural and Experimental Philosophy (1929–46)
- Scientific career
- Fields: Physics
- Workplaces: Trinity College Dublin (1928–46); University of Reading (1946–68)

Robert William Ditchburn (14 January 1903 – 8 April 1987) was a British physicist whose career started as Erasmus Smith's Professor of Natural and Experimental Philosophy at Trinity College Dublin (1929–1946), and ended at the University of Reading, where he worked hard to build up the physics department.

== Education ==
Robert William Ditchburn was born on 14 January 1903 in Waterloo, England. He was educated at Bootle Grammar School, of which his father was headmaster. At the age of 16, he won a scholarship to the University of Liverpool, where he graduated in 1922 with a B.Sc. Honours in Physics. He then entered Trinity College, Cambridge, graduating in 1924. He completed his Ph.D. in 1928 at the Cavendish Laboratory.

== Career ==
In 1928, Ditchburn successfully competed for a Fellowship at Trinity College Dublin, and the following year he became Erasmus Smith's Professor of Natural and Experimental Philosophy. In 1930, he was elected a Member of the Royal Irish Academy, and in 1945 delivered one of the Donnellan Lectures. Apart from a few years back in England at the Admiralty Research Laboratory in Teddington during WWII, he remained in Dublin until 1946.

In 1946, Ditchburn returned to England again, where he became head of the Department of Physics at the University of Reading, a position he held until his retirement in 1968. While there, he focussed on building up the department, and set up the J.J. Thomson Physical Laboratory. He authored the book Light (Interscience Publishers, Inc, 1953). His own research included work on photoionisation, the optical properties of solids and the effects of eye movements on visual perception, in particular methods for stabilising retinal images. In 1962, he became a Fellow of the Royal Society.

Ditchburn was very active in retirement, both as a consultant for the diamond industry, and working for nuclear disarmament in Pugwash movement. He published the book Eye Movements and Visual Perception (Clarendon Press, 1973) and in 1983 he was awarded the C. E. K. Mees Medal by The Optical Society "for his lengthy career in many disciplines of optics and for his enrichment of optical knowledge". In 1960, he got the Thomas Young Orator Prize.
