= Apjohnite =

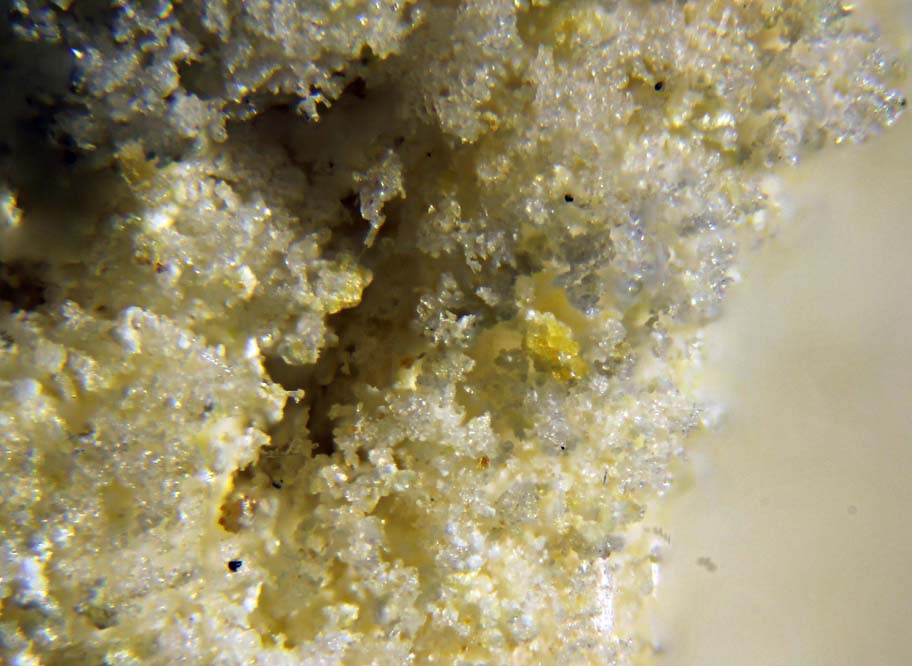
- Apjohnite (white) found with ilesite

General
- Category: Minerals
- Formula: Mn^{2+}Al_{2}(SO_{4})_{4}·22H_{2}O
- IMA symbol: API

Identification
- Color: Colourless, white, light pink, light yellow, light green
- Mohs scale hardness: 1.5-2
- Luster: Silky
- Streak: White
- Diaphaneity: Transparent, Translucent
- Specific gravity: 1.78 - 1.81
- Density: 1.78 - 1.81 g/cm3 (Measured); 1.836 g/cm3 (Calculated)

Apjohnite (IMA symbol: Apj) is a manganese aluminium sulfate mineral with the chemical formula Mn^{2+}Al_{2}(SO_{4})_{4}·22H_{2}O. It was named after Trinity College Dublin professor James Apjohn. Its type locality is Maputo Province, Mozambique.
