= Cunningham Medal =

Premier award of the Royal Irish Academy

The Cunningham Medal of RIA
- Awarded for: Outstanding contributions to scholarship and the objectives of the Academy
- Country: Ireland
- Presented by: Royal Irish Academy
- First award: 1796; 230 years ago
- Final award: 2023
- Website: www.ria.ie

The Cunningham Medal is the most prestigious award conferred by the Royal Irish Academy (RIA), the premier learned society of Ireland. It is awarded once every three years for, "Outstanding contributions to scholarship and the objectives of the Academy". The award was initiated in 1796, and can be shared by up to 3 recipients. It is regarded as one of the leading awards for Irish scientists and researchers, and receiving it allowed the recipient to join the institute as a Member of the Royal Irish Academy (MRIA), as outlined in the Academy's resolution.

The awarding of the medal was suspended between 1885 and 1989, and was resumed in 1990. It is now given only to senior members of the Royal Irish Academy, and consists of a gold medal containing the engraved image of Timothy Cunningham, the London-based barrister who founded the award to promote scientific learning in Ireland.

Notable recipients of the award include Sir William Rowan Hamilton, Humphrey Lloyd, George Salmon, Sir Howard Grubb, Robert Mallet, John Birmingham, and Jocelyn Bell Burnell.

== History ==
The original medal was cast by Irish medallist William Mossop. It was which was established in 1796 at the bequest of barrister Timothy Cunningham of Gray's Inn. After a period of uncertainty and experimentation regarding the terms and conditions of the award, it was agreed in 1848 that the medals would be open to the authors of works or essays in the areas of Science, Polite Literature and Antiquities, published in Ireland or about Irish subjects. After 1885, the academy stopped giving the award, but it was revived in 1989 for the bicentennial of Cunningham's gift.

== Recipients ==
The following persons have been awarded the Cunningham Medal:

- 1796: Thomas Wallace
- 1800: Theophilus Swift (writing, poetry)
- 1805: William Preston (poetry)
- 1818: John Brinkley (astronomy)
- 1827: John D'Alton (history)
- 1830: George Petrie (history)
- 1833: George Petrie (history)
- 1834: William Rowan Hamilton (mathematics)
- 1838: James MacCullagh (physics)
- 1839: James Apjohn (physics); George Petrie (history)
- 1843: Robert Kane (chemistry)
- 1848: Samuel Haughton (mathematics); Sir William Rowan Hamilton (mathematics); Edward Hincks (orientalist); John O'Donovan (history)
- 1851: John Hewitt Jellett (mathematics)
- 1858: Edward Joshua Cooper (astronomy); George Salmon (mathematics); Charles William Wall (literary criticism); William Reeves (history)
- 1862: Robert Mallet (seismology); Humphrey Lloyd (astronomy); John Thomas Gilbert (history); Whitley Stokes (linguistics)
- 1873: Sir William Wilde (polymath, father of Oscar Wilde)
- 1878: George James Allman (natural history); Edward Dowden (literary criticism); Aquilla Smith (numismatics); John Casey (mathematics)
- 1879: Robert Stawell Ball (mathematics); William Archer (natural history)
- 1881: Howard Grubb (astronomy)
- 1883: Edward Perceval Wright (editing Proceedings of RIA)
- 1884: John Birmingham (astronomy)
- 1885: John Christian Malet (mathematics)

Award suspended

- 1989: Frank Mitchell (natural history)
- 2001: Daniel Joseph Bradley (physics); Maurice Craig (architectural history); Sir Bernard Crossland (engineering); David Beers Quinn (history)
- 2005: Denis L. Weaire (physics)
- 2008: Seamus Heaney (poetry)
- 2011: John V McCanny (microelectronics)
- 2014: Patrick Honohan (economics)
- 2017: Dervilla M. X. Donnelly (chemistry)
- 2020: Nicholas Canny (history)
- 2023: Jocelyn Bell Burnell (astronomy)
