= Werner J. Blau =

Irish academic

- Born: 1954 (age 71–72); Regensburg, Germany
- Education: University of Regensburg
- Known for: Carbon nanotube–polymer composites, nanomaterials, optoelectronic materials
- Scientific career
- Fields: Physics, Materials Science, Nanotechnology
- Workplaces: Trinity College Dublin, AMBER Centre
- Doctoral advisor: A. Penzkofer

Werner Josef Blau was born in Regensberg, Germany in 1954. He was the Chair of Physics and Advanced Materials at Trinity College Dublin and AMBER Center. He is a Fellow Emeritus at Trinity College Dublin; Honorary Professor in the Chemistry Department of East China University of Science and Technology; Visiting Honorary Professor, Northwest University, Xi’an, China; and was Honoured Professor and China National High-end Foreign Expert at SIOM, Chinese Academy of Science.

== Education ==
He received his Diploma in Physics and Music (equivalent to M.Sc.) from University of Regensberg in 1979. Following from this, he continued onto a PhD in laser and ultra fast spectroscopy under the supervision of Prof A Penzkofer.

== Career ==
Werner J. Blau has spent the majority of his career in Trinity College Dublin. After a period at Siemens Research Labs, he joined the College in 1983, where he quickly acquired Dan Bradley's research group following Bradley's debilitating stroke. In 1992 he became the Research Director of the Advanced Polymer Research Centre at TCD Physics. He's held various positions at the college, including Lecturer in the Science of Materials/Physics (1986-1991), Associate Professor in the Science of Materials/Physics (1991 - 2003), Head of Department of the Physics Department (1998 - 2003). Since 2003 he has been the Personal Chair in Physics of Advanced Materials.

== Honors & Awards ==
- 2022 – Awarded Lifetime Achievement Awards at the Trinity Innovation Awards
- 2015 – Awarded International NANOSMAT prize.

== Research ==
Blau is a specialist in carbon nanotubes. His most cited papers are in this subject:

- Coleman JN, Khan U, Blau WJ, Gun’ko YK. Small but strong: a review of the mechanical properties of carbon nanotube–polymer composites. Carbon. 2006 Aug 1;44(9):1624-52.(Cited 4494 times, according to Google Scholar)
- De S, Higgins TM, Lyons PE, Doherty EM, Nirmalraj PN, Blau WJ, Boland JJ, Coleman JN. Silver nanowire networks as flexible, transparent, conducting films: extremely high DC to optical conductivity ratios. ACS Nano. 2009 Jul 28;3(7):1767-74. (Cited 640 times, according to Google Scholar.)
- Curran SA, Ajayan PM, Blau WJ, Carroll DL, Coleman JN, Dalton AB, Davey AP, Drury A, McCarthy B, Maier S, Strevens A. A composite from poly (m‐phenylenevinylene‐co‐2, 5‐dioctoxy‐p‐phenylenevinylene) and carbon nanotubes: A novel material for molecular optoelectronics. Advanced Materials. 1998 Oct;10(14):1091-3. (Cited 851 times, according to Google Scholar.)
