= John Robert Leslie (academic) =

Irish mathematician (1831–1881)

John Robert Leslie (1831 – 1 January 1881) was an Irish academic whose entire career was spent at Trinity College Dublin (TCD), where he was Erasmus Smith's Professor of Natural and Experimental Philosophy (1870–1881).

== Life and career ==
John Robert Leslie was born near Timoleague, Cork, to Rev John Leslie (1804–1838) and his wife Elizabeth Travers (1806?–1886), his father dying when he was young. He was educated at Drogheda Grammar School, and entered TCD on 1 July 1947, aged 16. He obtained BA (1852), MA (1856), DD (1862), and was elected a Fellow in 1858. He served as Erasmus Smith's Professor of Natural and Experimental Philosophy from 1870 until his death.
