= Arthur Robert MacDonnell =

Anglo-Irish soldier

Major-General Arthur Robert MacDonnell (1835-1900) R.E., J.P., was an Anglo-Irish soldier who served with the Royal Engineers during 1868 Expedition to Abyssinia under Sir Robert Napier.

McDonnell was born at Dalkey, County Dublin, the youngest son of Richard MacDonnell, Provost of Trinity College, Dublin.

He studied at the Royal Military Academy, Woolwich, and was gazetted into the Royal Engineers in 1854. After service in India, in 1868 he took part in the Abyssinian Expedition under Sir Robert Napier, during which he was made Brevet Major. In command of Companies 1, 2, 3 and 4 of the Bombay Sappers, he saw action at the Battle of Aroghee and the Battle of Magdala. At the capture of Magdala, he served alongside Harry Prendergast V.C., commander of the Madras Sappers, and was mentioned in despatches as "having rendered valuable and important services."

In 1884, he retired from the army with the rank of Major-General.

His first wife, Araminta Preston, was the daughter of Rev. Arthur Preston, grandson of William Beresford, 1st Baron Decies. His second wife, Florence, was a daughter of Sir Henry Nightingale, 13th Bt., of Newport Pond. He died at his home near Nairn, where he was Justice of the Peace. Arthur MacDonnell was a brother of Captain Frederick MacDonnell (1832-1858) of the Punjab Cavalry, who served with distinction in over twenty engagements but was shot and killed during the Indian Mutiny. Their elder brother, Major Charles MacDonnell (1823-1853) of the 29th (Worcestershire) Regiment of Foot, was killed at the Battle of Sobraon. Another of the brothers was Sir Richard Graves MacDonnell.
