= Richard MacDonnell (scholar) =

Irish cleric and academic

The Reverend Richard MacDonnell
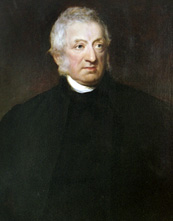

29th Provost of Trinity College Dublin
- In office 1 August 1851 – 24 January 1867
- Preceded by: Franc Sadleir
- Succeeded by: Humphrey Lloyd

Personal details
- Born: 10 June 1787 Cork, Ireland
- Died: 24 January 1867 (aged 79) Dublin, Ireland
- Spouse: Jane Graves (m. 1910)
- Children: 14, including Richard and Arthus
- Education: Trinity College, Dublin (B.A., 1805; LL.D., 1813)

Richard MacDonnell LL.D., D.D., S.F.T.C.D. (10 June 1787 – 24 January 1867) was an Irish cleric and academic who served as the 29th Provost of Trinity College Dublin from 1851 to 1867. He was also the projector of Sorrento Terrace, Dalkey, today known as Ireland's largest row of houses.

== Early life ==
MacDonnell, of the Tynekill MacDonnells of Leinster, was the son of Robert MacDonnell (1764–1821) of High Park, near Douglas, County Cork, and Susanna Nugent (1766–1836) of Ardmore, County Waterford, of the Cloncoskraine Nugents in the same county. For much of his life, his father had been prosperous, with a revenue appointment at Cork found for him by George Lowther, a family friend. Instead of retirement, he found property prices fell after 1815 and died disappointed.

== Trinity College Dublin ==
Educated at Trinity College, Dublin (1800–1805), MacDonnell was elected a scholar in 1803. In 1808, he was elected a lay Fellow at Trinity, allowing him to practise at the Irish Bar. He was awarded his LL.D. in 1813 but gave up his legal career to take holy orders the same year. The rest of his career was spent at Trinity College, where he was a Senior Fellow (1836–1852), Professor of Oratory (1816–1852) and an "efficient" Bursar (1836–1844), bringing the accounts of the collegiate estates into satisfactory order. In 1852, George Villiers, 4th Earl of Clarendon, Lord-Lieutenant of Ireland, appointed him the 29th Provost of Trinity College Dublin, succeeding Franc Sadleir. He took up residence at the Provost's House. He held the position for 15 years until he died in 1867.

From 1820 to 1827, he was the Donegall Lecturer in Mathematics at Trinity College Dublin.

MacDonnell advocated Catholic Emancipation when it was unpopular within Trinity. His broad views encompassed politics and education, and the significant changes he brought about are a testament to his firm character. His period of office is noted for the number of new statutes brought in, which transformed the college code of laws. It gave Trinity "a fresh impetus in its career and usefulness". Another source described him as 'clever but very lazy'.

MacDonnell was said to have had 'an excellent dry sense of humour', demonstrated on one occasion when showing a lady around the impressive Trinity College Library, Dublin. She, clasping her hands together, exclaimed, 'Oh Mr Provost, pray Mr Provost, have you read all these books?' he replied, 'In time, my dear lady, in time'. On another occasion, after the plates had been cleared between the courses of a dinner he was hosting, his butler quietly placed a sugar cube on his bald head. Engaging his guests on a serious subject, his parrot would have flown into the dining room and seated itself on the Provost's head to eat the sugar cube as the Provost continued with his philosophical musings, giving the impression of being completely unfazed.

== Sorrento Terrace, Dalkey ==
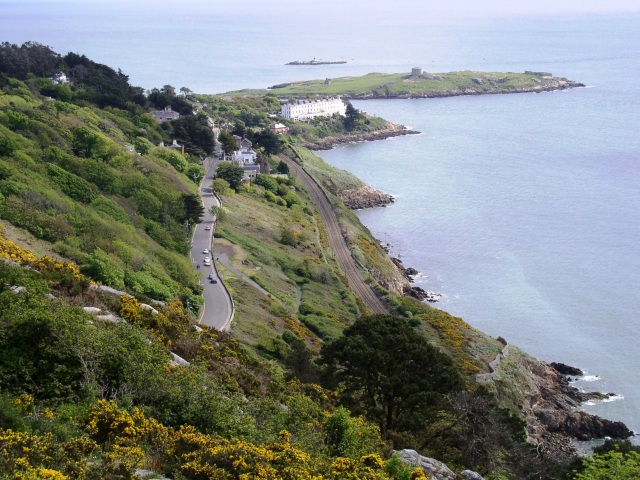
Sorrento Terrace from Killiney Hill

MacDonnell had inherited Knocklyon House near Dalkey, Dublin. Still, after his mother died there the previous year, in 1837, he leased it out and bought a plot of land by the seafront at Dalkey, where he built a new country retreat, Sorrento Cottage, now owned by The Edge of the Irish rock band U2. Named after Sorrento on the Bay of Naples, the allure of Sorrento Terrace is its situation and the view across Killiney Bay to the Wicklow Mountains, the Great Sugar Loaf taking the place of Mount Vesuvius.

In the early 1840s, MacDonnell devised a plan for the construction of 22 houses right into the corner near the boundaries of the cottage, a huge undertaking at the time that was stalled almost immediately due to the Great Famine – the family having decided to help those around them rather than themselves. In 1845, the family had built the first and largest of the terrace residences, 'Sorrento House', and then MacDonnell leased the rest of the land to his son, Hercules Henry Graves MacDonnell, who from the 1850s built the remaining houses for £1,000 each. The family stipulated that each house had to adhere strictly to the design of architects Frederick Darley and Nathaniel Montgomery. The houses today are known as 'millionaire's row', famous for being Ireland's most expensive row of houses.

== Family ==
In 1810, Richard MacDonnell married Jane Graves, daughter of the Very Rev. Richard Graves, and sister of Robert James Graves. They were the parents of fourteen children, including Sir Richard Graves MacDonnell and Major-General Arthur Robert MacDonnell. He was the uncle of Francis Brinkley and Richard Charles Mayne and the uncle and guardian of Edmund Allen Meredith, the principal of McGill University in Montreal.

== Arms ==
Coat of arms of Richard MacDonnell

Notes
Confirmed by John Bernard Burke, Ulster King of Arms, 30 December 1863.
Crest
A demi-eagle displayed and erased Or encircled around the body below the wings with a ducal coronet Gules, each wing charged with a cross patonce also Gules.
Escutcheon
Quarterly 1st & 4th Per pale Gules and Azure an eagle displayed ducally crowned Or in the dexter chief point a cross patonce of the last 2nd & 3rd Argent on a chief indented Gules three crosses pattee of the field a crescent for difference.
Motto
Aquila Non Captat Muscas

Academic offices
| Preceded by Franc Sadleir | Provost of Trinity College Dublin; 1852–1867 | Succeeded by Humphrey Lloyd |
