= Ernest Walton =

Irish physicist (1903–1995)

Ernest Walton MRIA
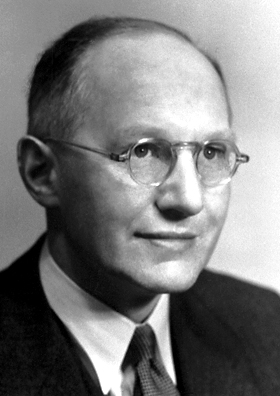
- Walton in 1951
- Born: Ernest Thomas Sinton Walton; 6 October 1903; Dungarvan, Ireland
- Died: 25 June 1995 (aged 91); Belfast, Northern Ireland
- Resting place: Dean's Grange Cemetery
- Education: University of Dublin (BA, MSc); University of Cambridge (PhD)
- Known for: First fully artificial nuclear transmutation
- Spouse: Winifred Wilson (m. 1934)
- Children: 4
- Awards: Hughes Medal (1938); Nobel Prize in Physics (1951)
- Scientific career
- Fields: Physics
- Workplaces: University of Cambridge; Trinity College Dublin
- Thesis: The production of fast particles; Galvanometer and oscillograph design (1931)
- Doctoral advisor: Ernest Rutherford

Ernest Thomas Sinton Walton (6 October 1903 – 25 June 1995) was an Irish experimental physicist. He shared the 1951 Nobel Prize in Physics with John Cockcroft "for their pioneer work on the transmutation of atomic nuclei by artificially accelerated atomic particles." According to their Nobel Prize speech: "Thus, for the first time, a nuclear transmutation was produced by means entirely under human control."

Walton was a key member of the nuclear physics faculty at the University of Cambridge, where he worked with Cockcroft and Ernest Rutherford. He then spent the majority of his career in Ireland, after returning from England in 1934. He remained active as a member of the teaching faculty at Trinity College Dublin, where he served as Erasmus Smith's Professor of Natural and Experimental Philosophy from 1946 until his retirement in 1974, after which he continued to be associated with the physics department at the college. Along with William Rowan Hamilton, Walton is regarded as one of the most influential Irish physicists.

== Early life and education ==
Ernest Thomas Sinton Walton was born on 6 October 1903 in Dungarvan, County Waterford, Ireland, the son of Anna Elizabeth (née Sinton) and John Walton, a Methodist minister. His father was from Cloughjordan, County Tipperary, while his mother was from Richhill, County Armagh. In those days, a general clergyman's family moved once every three years, and the Walton family lived in 13 different locations in Ireland between 1901 and 1995. Walton had a sister, Dorothy, who was born in 1905. After his mother's death the following year, his father later married Mary Elizabeth Kirkwood; they had one child, James, who was born in 1919.

Walton attended day schools in counties Down and Tyrone, and at Wesley College Dublin, before becoming a boarder at Methodist College Belfast in 1915, where he excelled in science and mathematics.

In 1922, Walton won scholarships to attend Trinity College Dublin for the study of mathematics and experimental science, specialising in physics. He graduated with first-class honours in 1926, and obtained a Master of Science the following year. During these years at college, he received numerous prizes for excellence in physics and mathematics (seven prizes in all), including the Foundation Scholarship in 1924. In 1927, he was awarded an 1851 Research Fellowship from the Royal Commission for the Exhibition of 1851 and was accepted as a research student at Trinity College, Cambridge, under the supervision of Ernest Rutherford, Director of the Cavendish Laboratory. At the time, there were four Nobel Prize laureates on the staff in the Cavendish Laboratory and a further five were to emerge, including Walton and John Cockcroft. Walton received a Doctor of Philosophy in 1931, and remained at Cambridge as a Clerk Maxwell Scholar until 1934.

== Research ==
During the early 1930s, Walton and Cockcroft collaborated to build an apparatus that split the nuclei of lithium atoms by bombarding them with a stream of protons accelerated inside a high-voltage tube (700 kilovolts). The splitting of the lithium nuclei produced helium nuclei. They went on to use boron and carbon as targets for their 'disintegration' experiments, and to report induced radioactivity. These experiments provided verification of theories about atomic structure that had been proposed earlier by Rutherford, George Gamow, and others. The successful apparatus, a type of particle accelerator (now called the Cockcroft–Walton generator), helped to usher in an era of particle accelerator-based experimental nuclear physics. It was this research at Cambridge in the early 1930s that won Walton and Cockcroft the Nobel Prize in Physics in 1951.

== Career in Dublin ==
Walton returned to Ireland in 1934 to become a Fellow of Trinity College Dublin in the Physics Department. He was appointed Erasmus Smith's Professor of Natural and Experimental Philosophy in 1946, and was promoted to Senior Fellow in 1960. His lecturing was considered outstanding as he had the ability to present complicated matters in simple and easy-to-understand terms. His research interests were pursued with very limited resources, yet he was able to study, in the late 1950s, the phosphorescent effect in glasses, secondary-electron emissions from surfaces under positive-ion bombardment, radiocarbon dating and low-level counting, and the deposition of thin films on glass.

Walton was associated with the Dublin Institute for Advanced Studies for over 40 years, where he served long periods on the board of the School of Cosmic Physics and on the council of the Institute. Following the 1952 death of John J. Nolan, the inaugural chairman of the School of Cosmic Physics, Walton assumed the role and served in that position until 1960, when he was succeeded by John H. Poole.

Along with Lochlainn O'Raifeartaigh and Michael Fry, Walton helped found the Irish Pugwash group, opposing the nuclear arms race.

Walton served on a committee of Wesley College, Dublin.

== Later life and death ==
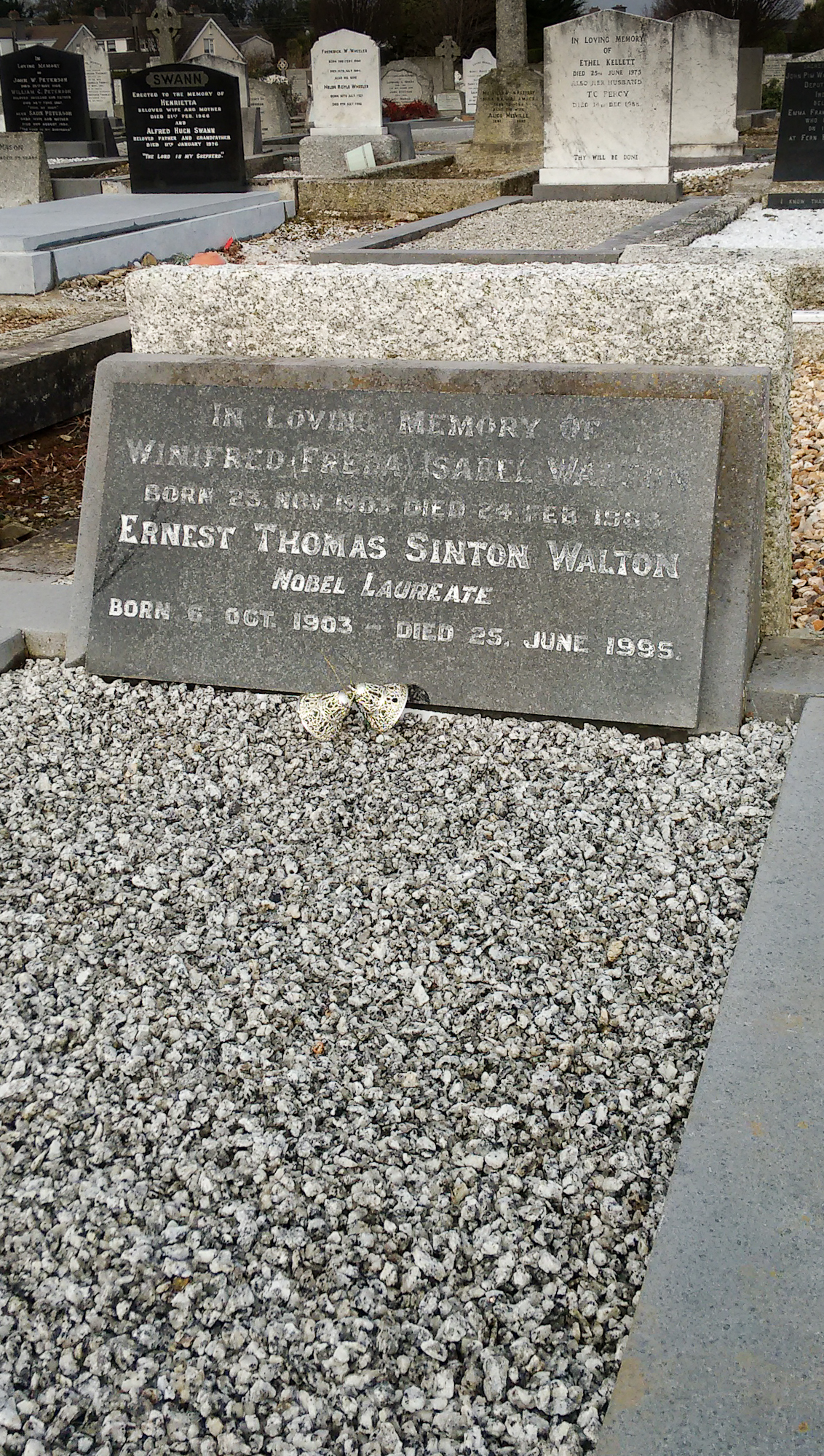
Walton's grave in Dean's Grange Cemetery, south County Dublin.

Although Walton retired from Trinity College Dublin in 1974, he retained his association with the Physics Department at Trinity up to his final illness. Shortly before his death, he marked his lifelong devotion to Trinity by presenting his Nobel medal and citation to the college.

Walton died on 25 June 1995 in Belfast at the age of 91. He is buried in Dean's Grange Cemetery, near Dublin.

== Family ==
In 1934, Walton married Winifred Wilson, the daughter of a Methodist minister. They had four children: Alan Walton (a physicist at the University of Cambridge), Marian Woods, Philip Walton (Professor of Applied Physics, NUI Galway), and Jean Clarke.

== Religious views ==
Raised as a Methodist, Walton has been described as someone who was strongly committed to the Christian faith. He gave lectures about the relationship of science and religion in several countries after he won the Nobel Prize, and he encouraged the progress of science as a way to know more about God.

Walton is quoted as saying:

"One way to learn the mind of the Creator is to study His creation. We must pay God the compliment of studying His work of art and this should apply to all realms of human thought. A refusal to use our intelligence honestly is an act of contempt for Him who gave us that intelligence."

— V. J. McBrierty (2003): Ernest Thomas Sinton Walton, The Irish Scientist, 1903-1995, Trinity College Dublin Press.)

Walton held an interest in topics about the government and the Church, and after his death, the organisation Christians in Science Ireland established the Walton Lectures on Science and Religion (an initiative similar to the Boyle Lectures). David Wilkinson, Denis Alexander, and others have given Walton Lectures in universities across Ireland.

== Recognition ==
=== Memberships ===
Year	Organisation	Type	Ref.
1935	Royal Irish Academy	Member	

=== Awards ===
Year	Organisation	Award	Citation	Ref.
1938	Royal Society	Hughes Medal	"For their [Walton and John Cockcroft] discovery that nuclei could be disintegrated by artificially produced bombarding particles."	
1951	Royal Swedish Academy of Sciences	Nobel Prize in Physics	"For their [Walton and John Cockcroft] pioneer work on the transmutation of atomic nuclei by artificially accelerated atomic particles."	

=== Honorary degrees ===
Year	University	Degree	Ref.
1959	Queen's University Belfast	Doctor of Science	
1988	Ulster University	Doctor of Science	
1991	Dublin City University	Doctor of Philosophy	

== Commemoration ==
The Walton Causeway Park in Walton's native Dungarvan was dedicated in his honour with Walton himself attending the ceremony in 1989. After his death the Waterford Institute of Technology named a building the ETS Walton Building and a plaque was placed on the site of his birthplace.

Other honours for Walton include the Walton Building at Methodist College Belfast, the school where he had been a boarder for five years, and a memorial plaque outside the main entrance to Methodist College. Wesley College in Dublin, where he attended and for many years served as chairman of the board of Governors, established the Walton Prize for Physics, and a prize with the same name at Methodist College is awarded to the pupil who obtains the highest marks in A Level Physics. There is also a scholarship in Waterford named after Walton. In 2014, Trinity College Dublin set up the Trinity Walton Club, an extracurricular STEM Education centre for teenagers.
