= William Davenport (scientist) =

Irish scientist

William Davenport (1772–1823) was an Irish academic. He was the eighth Erasmus Smith's Professor of Natural and Experimental Philosophy at Trinity College Dublin (TCD), serving in that role from 1807 to 1822.

== Life and career ==
Davenport was born in Dublin, son of Edmund and Eliza Davenport of Capel Street, being baptized 14 October 1772. He matriculated at TCD 6 November 1787, aged 15. He was a Scholar in 1791 and received BA (1792), MA (1796) and DD (1808) from that institution. He was elected a Fellow in 1795, and served as Erasmus Smith's Professor of Natural and Experimental Philosophy (1807–1822). He was also appointed Archbishop King's Lecturer in Divinity in 1815. and was active in astronomical circles.

He spent the last two years of his life as a clergyman.

== Sources ==
- Burtchaell, G. D., and Sadleir, T. U. (eds), Alumni Dublinenses: A Register of the Students, Graduates, Professors and Provosts of Trinity College in the University of Dublin, 1593–1860 (Dublin, 1935), page 212
