= Liquid phase exfoliation =

Solution-processing method

First demonstrated in 2008, liquid-phase exfoliation (LPE) is a solution-processing method which is used to convert layered crystals into two-dimensional nanosheets in large quantities. It is currently one of the pillar methods for producing 2D nanosheets. According to IDTechEx, the family of exfoliation techniques which are directly or indirectly descended from LPE now make up over 60% of global graphene production capacity.

This method involves adding powdered layered crystals, for example of graphite, to appropriate solvents and inserting energy, often by ultrasonication, although high-shear mixing is often commonly used. The addition of energy causes a combination of fragmentation and exfoliation resulting in the removal of small nanosheets from the layered crystals. In this way graphite can be converted into large quantities of graphene nanosheets. In general, these nanosheets tend to be a few monolayers thick and of lateral sizes ranging from tens of nanometers to many microns. These dispersed nanosheets form quasi stable suspensions so long as solvents used have surface energies similar to that of the nanosheets. Dispersed concentrations of order 1 gram per litre can be achieved. In addition to solvents, it is also possible to use molecular stabilizers, for example surfactants or polymers to coat the nanosheets and stabilise them against regaggregation. This has the advantage that it allows nanosheets to be suspended in water.

Although this method was first applied to exfoliate graphite to yield graphene nanosheets, it has since been used to produce a wide range of 2D materials including molybdenum disulfide, tungsten diselenide, boron nitride, nickel(II) hydroxide, germanium monosulfide, SnP_{3}, and black phosphorus. The liquid suspensions produced by liquid phase exfoliation can be used to create a range of functional structures. For example, they can be printed into thin films and networks using standard techniques such as inkjet printing.

Printed structures have been used in a range of applications in areas included printed electronics, sensors and nanocomposites. Related methods include exfoliation by wet ball milling, homogenization, microfluidization and wet jet milling. Liquid phase exfoliation is different from other liquid exfoliation methods, for example the production of graphene oxide, because it is much less destructive, leaving minimal defects in the basal planes of the nanosheets. It has recently emerged that LPE can also be used to convert non-layered crystals into quasi-2D nanoplatelets.

== Origins ==
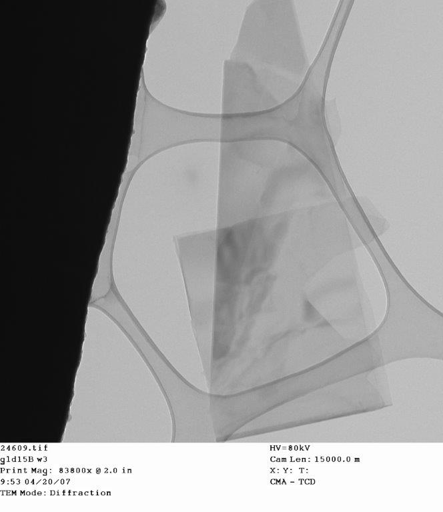
One of the earliest transmission electron microscope images of a graphene nanosheet produced by liquid phase exfoliation (exfoliated by the Dublin group in 2007).

Liquid phase exfoliation was first described in detail in a paper by a research team in Ireland in 2008, although a very short description of a similar process was published by the Manchester group around the same time. While other papers had previously described methods to exfoliate layered crystals in liquids, these papers were the first to describe exfoliation in liquids without any previous ion intercalation or chemical treatment.

== Exfoliation methods ==
LPE involves inserting layered crystals into appropriate stabilizing liquids and then adding energy to remove nanosheets from the layered crystals. A number of different methods have been used to supply energy to the liquid. The earliest and most common is ultrasonication. In order to scaleup the process, high shear mixing was introduced in 2014. This method proved extremely useful and inspired a number of other methods of generating shear in the suspension, including wet ball milling, homogenization, microfluidization and wet jet milling.

== Stabilisers ==
The simplest stabilizing liquids are solvents with surface energy close to the layered crystal being exfoliated. In practice, liquids with surface tensions close to 70 mJ/m^{2} are used. In addition aqueous surfactant solutions are often used. Less common, but useful for certain applications, is using molecular or polymeric additives to stabilise the exfoliated nanosheets.

== LPE of 2D materials beyond graphene ==
A very wide range of 2D materials have been produced by LPE. The first material to be exfoliated was graphene in 2008. This was followed in 2011 by the exfoliation of BN, MoS2 and WS2. Since, then a wide range of 2D materials have been exfoliated including molybdenum diselenide, tungsten diselenide, gallium sulphide, molybdenum trioxide, nickel(II) hydroxide, germanium monosulfide, SnP_{3}, black phosphorus etc.

== LPE of non-layered materials ==
Recent work has shown that liquid phase exfoliation can be used to produce 2D-nanoplatelets from non-layered 3D-strongly bonded bulk materials. This is intuitively unexpected as these 3D-solid bulk crystals consists of strong bonds in all the three-directions. Nevertheless, many non-layered materials such as boron, silicon, germanium, iron disulfide, iron oxide, iron trifluoride, manganese telluride, have been converted to 2D nanoplatelets when sonicated in appropriate solvents. This raises many open questions on the mechanism of liquid-phase exfoliation process. For layered materials, the energy required to break inter-plane (predominately van der Waals) bonds forces is small compared to that required to break in-plane ionic or covalent bonds. Then, the exfoliation procedure results in the formation of 2D-nanosheets. However, for non-layered 3D-strongly bonded materials, with minimal difference in bonding between different atomic planes, there is no "easily exfoliated" direction and sonication should yield quasi spherical particles. Nevertheless, near isotropic materials such as silicon have been exfoliated to give high-aspect ratio platelets. Therefore, developing an understanding of the mechanisms by which non-layered materials are exfoliated will be important, in particular because the application scope of such nonlayered 2D-nanoplatelets is broad, ranging from biomedical applications to energy storage to opto-electronics.
