= George Miller (historian) =

Church of Ireland clergyman

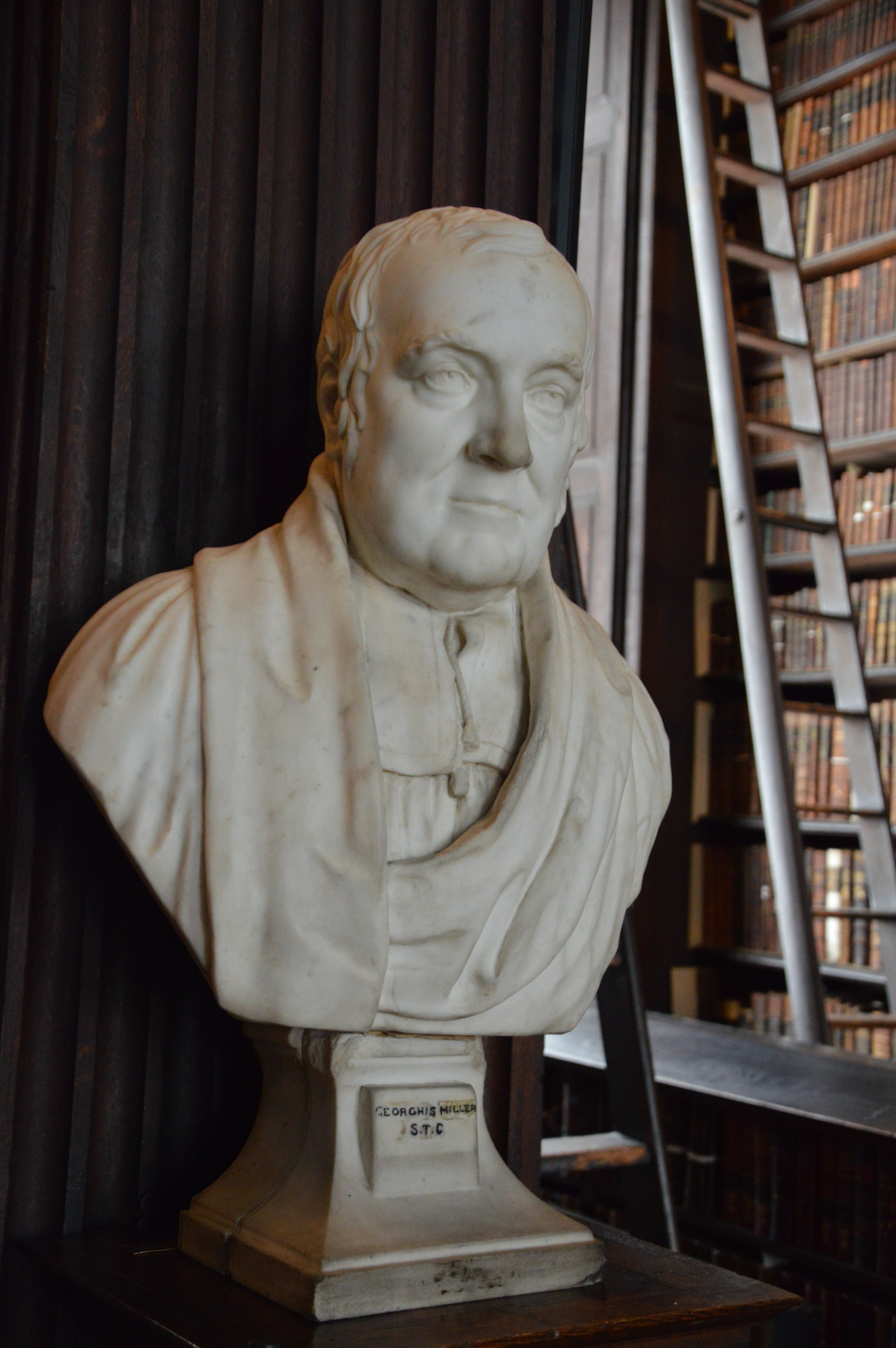
Bust of George Miller in the Trinity College library.

George Miller (1764 – 6 October 1848) was an Irish Anglican priest and historian of Trinity College, Dublin. He developed a course in modern European history at the college after being passed over for a professorship and appointed assistant to Francis Hodgkinson, professor of modern history at the college, who gave no lectures during his 41-year tenure. Miller's college lectures were published in eight parts between 1816 and 1828 and reissued in four volumes in 1832 as History, philosophically illustrated, from the fall of the Roman Empire, to the French Revolution, which went through three editions.

== Early life and education ==
George Miller was born in 1764. He held three earned degrees from Trinity College including doctor of divinity (DD).

== Academic career ==
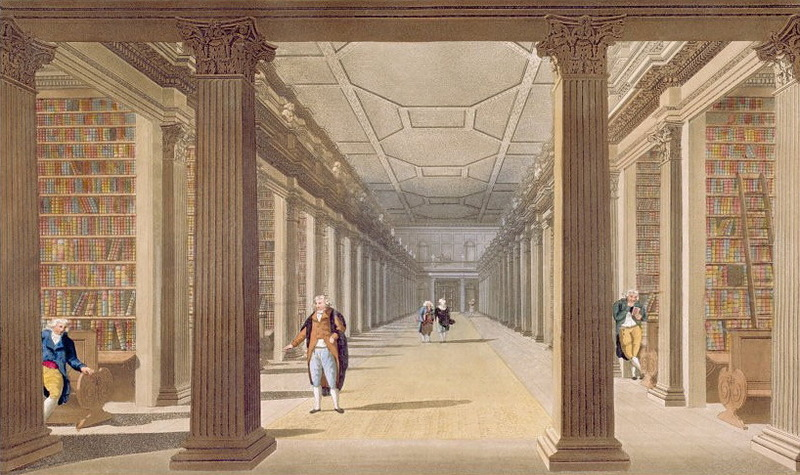
Trinity College Library, Dublin, by James Malton (1761–1803).

Miller was elected a fellow of Trinity College, Dublin, in 1789. In 1790, he was elected a member of the Royal Irish Academy and was later a member of the Council of that organisation and a secretary. In 1799, he was passed over for the chair in Natural and Experimental Philosophy in favour of Thomas Elrington but possibly as a form of consolation prize was appointed assistant to Francis Hodgkinson, the newly appointed professor of modern history who did not deliver any lecturers on the subject between then and his death in 1840. John Kearney, provost of the college, whose brother Michael Kearney had enjoyed great success by writing and publishing four lectures on the government of Rome, suggested to Miller that he do something similar in the field of modern history. As a result, Miller developed a lecture series on modern European history that found an audience "more remarkable for its intelligence than its numbers" at first but which gradually grew in popularity until it had to be delivered in the Examination Hall.

Miller claimed that the lectures "slowly and gradually formed ... requiring little more than to be combined together in an orderly arrangement" and that they were not the result of any "enthusiasm of religious feeling", however, later commentators have described the lecturers as "pietistic" and Miller devoted considerable space in the preface to the four-volume edition (1832) to a description of the method by which he reconciled the more unpleasant parts of historical fact with his religious faith, arguing that he was:

"not required by his theory to vindicate, or to censure, any transaction, all being according to it, conducive, directly or indirectly, to the same end ... He had only to endeavour to show how each transaction has been by its consequences a part of a combined whole, having for its general issue the improvement of human society; how each leading individual, whatever may have been the motive, or the quality of his conduct, was an agent, though free and unconscious, in the execution of the plan of a wise and beneficent providence."

Miller's approach has been described as being in the Providential tradition and a review in The Dublin University Magazine in 1839 noted that "Dr. Miller advances and establishes his great principles, that God reigneth in the affairs of men, and that the end of the divine government is man's improvement" while The Edinburgh Review in 1830, referring to the first edition, understood Miller's premise to be that "all the events of this world have an intrinsic connexion" and that "the study of human events, as well as of external nature, tends to illustrate the divine perfection" before entering into a detailed discussion of how the historian could reconcile the existence of evil in the world with God's omnipotence.

In May 1799, Miller wrote to Lord Castlereagh, Chief Secretary for Ireland in the British government, following rumours that the British government was to establish a new college at Armagh. In the letter, which was first published in Castlereagh's correspondence in 1848, Miller offered his views on the curriculum and form of studies that might be offered by such a college and compared and contrasted the universities of England, Scotland and Ireland, finding them all wanting in different respects. The college was never established and, as far as is known, Castlereagh did not reply to the letter, but it provides evidence of Miller's eclectic views on education and accounts of the form of university instruction current at the time.

In 1804, Miller resigned his fellowship and took up a clerical living in County Fermanagh. He continued to deliver his history lectures until 1811 for which he received a salary of £100 per annum. After they ceased, history lecturing also ceased at Trinity College for some time. His lectures were first published as Lectures on the philosophy of modern history in eight parts in Dublin between 1816 and 1828 and reissued in four volumes as History, philosophically illustrated, from the fall of the Roman Empire, to the French Revolution in London in 1832 which went through three editions.

Miller was a strict vegetarian for the last forty years of his life.

== Clerical career ==
Miller took up a clerical living in Derryvollan, County Fermanagh in 1804, subsequently becoming vicar general of Armagh and the headmaster of the school there.

== Death and legacy ==
Miller died on 6 October 1848. He married Elizabeth Ball, daughter of Robert Ball of County Wicklow. His children included the leading politician and judge Stearne Ball Miller, Charles, Rector of Carlingford, County Louth, and Emily. His grandson was the Irish Anglican priest and historian Beaver Henry Blacker.

== Selected publications ==
His publications include:

- "An essay on the origin and nature of our idea of the sublime", Transactions of the Royal Irish Academy, Vol. 5 (1793/1794), pp. 17–38.
- "Observations on the theory of electric attraction and repulsion", The Transactions of the Royal Irish Academy, Vol. 7 (1800), pp. 139–150.
- Lecturers on the philosophy of modern history. Dublin, 1816–28. (8 parts)
- A letter to ... the Lord Primate of Ireland on the manner in which Christianity was taught by our Saviour and his Apostles. London, 1822.
- Observations on the doctrines of Christianity in reference to Arianism, illustrating the moderation of the Established Church; and on the Athanasian Creed, purporting to prove that it is not damnatory, nor metaphysical, nor contradictory. With an appendix concerning the state of the Presbyterian Church of Ireland, occasioned by the sermons of W. Bruce, D.D. London & Dublin, 1825.
- The policy of the Roman Catholic question discussed, in a Letter to the Right Honourable W.C. Plunket. London, 1826.
- History, philosophically illustrated, from the fall of the Roman Empire, to the French Revolution. London, 1832. (four volumes) 2nd. 3rd, 1852.
- The principal events of modern history, with their times, selected in reference to modern history philosophically illustrated. J. M'Watters, Armagh, 1839.
- The present crisis of the Church of Ireland considered. Dublin, 1845. (2nd edition)
