= Regius Professor of Greek (Dublin) =

Professorship at Trinity College Dublin, Ireland

The Regius Professorship of Greek is a professorship at Trinity College Dublin. The chair was founded by George III in 1761.

By statute, the Regius Professor was originally always appointed from among the existing senior fellows of the college, and the position was often only held for a few years at a time, with a salary that was not high, with the result that the study of Greek at the college was relatively neglected. In 1855, the professorship was remodelled by statute so that the holder of the position could be appointed on a permanent basis, beginning with the appointment of Thomas Stack, one of the college's junior fellows.

In the twentieth century, the position was held for forty years by William Bedell Stanford, a noted authority on classical Greek literature, who also represented Dublin University in Seanad Éireann.

Since 2017, the position has been combined with the new position of A. G. Leventis Professor in Greek Culture, in recognition of financial support received from the Cyprus-based A. G. Leventis Foundation. The first holder of this combined position is Ahuvia Kahane, appointed in 2019.

== List of Regius Professors of Greek ==
- 1761: Theaker Wilder
- 1764: John Stokes
- 1775: Henry Joseph Dabzac
- 1778: James Drought
- 1790: George Hall
- 1792: Arthur Browne
- 1795: George Hall
- 1796: John Barrett
- 1797: Arthur Browne
- 1799: Matthew Young
- 1800: F. Hodgkinson
- 1801: Arthur Browne
- 1806: F. Hodgkinson
- 1807: Robert Phipps
- 1809: William Magee
- 1810: Richard Graves
- 1811: Robert Phipps
- 1813: Thomas Prior
- 1821: Bartholomew Lloyd
- 1824: Thomas Prior
- 1825: Bartholomew Lloyd
- 1829: Thomas Prior
- 1833: Franc Sadleir
- 1843: Richard MacDonnell
- 1852: Thomas Luby
- 1855: Thomas Stack
- 1866: John Kells Ingram
- 1880: Robert Yelverton Tyrrell
- 1898: John Bagnell Bury
- 1902: John Isaac Beare
- 1915: Josiah Gilbart Smyly
- 1927: George William Mooney
- 1933: William Alexander Goligher
- 1940: William Bedell Stanford
- 1980: John Myles Dillon
- 2006: Brian McGing
- 2019: Ahuvia Kahane

== See also ==
- Regius Professor of Greek (Cambridge)
- Regius Professor of Greek (Oxford)
