= Hugh Hamilton (bishop) =

Bishop of Ossory; Bishop of Clonfert and Kilmacduagh; Irish Anglican bishop

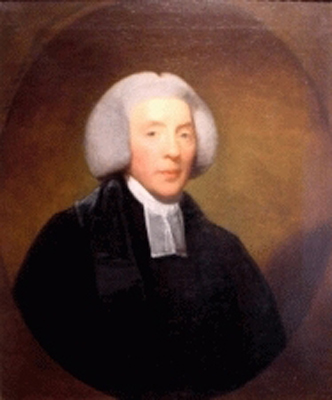
- Portrait by Gilbert Stuart, c. 1790
- Born: 26 March 1729; Knock, County Dublin, Ireland
- Died: 1 December 1805 (aged 76); Kilkenny, County Kilkenny, Ireland
- Known for: Professor of natural philosophy, Anglican bishop

Hugh Hamilton FRS (26 March 1729 – 1 December 1805) was a mathematician, natural philosopher (scientist) and professor at Trinity College Dublin, and later a Church of Ireland bishop, Bishop of Clonfert and Kilmacduagh and then Bishop of Ossory.

== Life ==
He was born at Knock, near Balrothery in County Dublin (now Fingal), on 26 March 1729, the eldest son of Alexander (died 1768) and Isabella Hamilton. His father was a solicitor and politician who represented the Killyleagh constituency in the Irish House of Commons from 1739 to 1759. Alexander's great-grandfather Hugh Hamilton migrated from Scotland to County Down in the early 17th century. The Scottish architect James Hamilton of Finnart was an ancestor. Isabella Hamilton was born Isabella Maxwell, the daughter of Robert Maxwell of Finnebrogue, Downpatrick. Hugh's siblings included George Hamilton, Baron of the Court of Exchequer (Ireland) and Charles, father of the wealthy Canadian lumber merchant and politician George Hamilton.

Hamilton entered Trinity College Dublin on 17 November 1742 at the age of 13 with Thomas McDonnell as his tutor. He graduated Bachelor of Arts (BA) in 1747 and Trinity Master of Arts (MA Dubl) in 1750. He took the competitive examination for a vacant fellowship of the college in 1750, but the position was secured instead by his friend Richard Murray, who was a few years older. Two fellowships became vacant the following year and Hamilton was elected to one of them at the age of 22. He was appointed Erasmus Smith's Professor of Natural and Experimental Philosophy at Trinity College Dublin in 1759 and that same year graduated Bachelor of Divinity (BD). He was elected a Fellow of the Royal Society on 19 February 1761 and graduated Doctor of Divinity (DD) in 1762.

Trinity College presented him to the rectory of Kilmacrenan in the diocese of Raphoe, County Donegal, in 1764. This was a small living in the gift of the college, for which he resigned his fellowship. He retained the Erasmus Smith's chair, however, being succeeded in that by Thomas Wilson in 1769. He resigned from Kilmacrenan in 1767 and become vicar of St. Anne's in Dublin.

He then became Dean of Armagh, the chief resident cleric of St Patrick's Cathedral in Armagh, from April 1768 to 1796. Finding the existing dean's house inconvenient and poorly situated, he had a new one built in a better location just off Portadown Road, now known as Dean's Hill. The house, of three stories and a semi-basement, was built in 1772–74. The house was later sold by the church and the present owners provide bed and breakfast accommodation in it. While dean he also acted as treasurer for the infirmary or county hospital, he established Sunday schools in the districts of the parish, and he founded a charitable loan for poor tradesmen. He was also instrumental in planning a piped water supply for the town, which was later put into effect. Hamilton was one of the 38 original members of the Royal Irish Academy when it was founded in 1785. Gilbert Stuart painted his portrait in about 1790.

He was promoted to Bishop of Clonfert and Kilmacduagh on 20 January 1796, without seeking it. On 24 January 1799 he was translated to Ossory, where he was bishop until 1805. He died of a fever at Kilkenny on 1 December 1805. He was buried in the graveyard of St Canice's Cathedral at Kilkenny, and there is a memorial to him inside the cathedral.

== Works ==
Hamilton wrote a mathematical treatise on conic sections called De Sectionibus Conicis: Tractatus Geometricus, published in 1758. In this book he "was the first to deduce the properties of the conic section from the properties of the cone, by demonstrations which were general, unencumbered by lemmas, and proceeding in a more natural and perspicuous order", according to writer James Wills in 1847. The work was acclaimed for its lucidity and Leonhard Euler described it as a perfect book. It was "soon adopted in all the British universities" and was translated from Latin into English as A Geometrical Treatise of the Conic Sections in 1773.

He also wrote Philosophical Essays on Vapours (1767), Four Introductory Lectures on Natural Philosophy (1774), and An Essay on the Existence and Attributes of the Supreme Being (1784). His principal works were collected and republished, with a memoir, as The Works of the Right Rev. Hugh Hamilton by his eldest son, Alexander Hamilton, in two volumes in 1809.

== Family ==
Hamilton married Isabella, daughter of Hans Widman Wood of Rosmead, County Westmeath, in 1772. Isabella's mother Frances was the twin sister of Edward King, 1st Earl of Kingston. Hugh and Isabella had five sons and two daughters. They were Alexander, who was a barrister; Frances; Hans, who was rector of Knocktopher and associated with the Carrickshock incident of 1831; Isabella; Henry; George, who was a biblical scholar; and Hugh, who married Elizabeth Staples, a daughter of John Staples, a Member of Parliament. The younger Hugh was the great-grandfather of Clive Staples Lewis, better known as C. S. Lewis. Bishop Hugh Hamilton was a great-great-great-grandfather of the mathematicians John Lighton Synge and his brother Edward Hutchinson Synge. Dodgson Hamilton Madden, the High Court judge and noted scholar, was the Bishop's great-grandson.

Church of Ireland titles
Preceded by Charles Brodrick	Bishop of Clonfert and Kilmacduagh; 1795–1799	Succeeded by Matthew Young
Preceded by Thomas O'Beirne	Bishop of Ossory; 1799–1805	Succeeded by John Kearney
