= Dirac's theorem =

Dirac's theorem may refer to:

- Dirac's theorem on Hamiltonian cycles, the statement that an n-vertex graph in which each vertex has degree at least n/2 must have a Hamiltonian cycle
- Dirac's theorem on chordal graphs, the characterization of chordal graphs as graphs in which all minimal separators are cliques
- Dirac's theorem on cycles in k-connected graphs, the result that for every set of k vertices in a k-vertex-connected graph there exists a cycle that passes through all the vertices in the set

== See also ==
- Gabriel Andrew Dirac (1925–1984), a graph theorist after whom these three theorems were named
- Paul Dirac (1902–1984), a mathematical physicist
- Dirac equation in particle physics
- Dirac large numbers hypothesis relating the size scale of the universe to the scales between different physical forces
