= The International Journal of the Platonic Tradition =

- Discipline: Philosophy
- Language: English
- Edited by: John F. Finamore

Publication details
- History: 1985–present
- Publisher: Brill Publishers
- Frequency: Biannually
- Open access: Yes
- License: CC-BY-NC

Standard abbreviations
- ISO 4: Int. J. Platonic Tradit.

Indexing
- ISSN: 1872-5082 (print); 1872-5473 (web)
- LCCN: 2011213411
- OCLC no.: 182523836

Links
- Journal homepage; Online access

The International Journal of the Platonic Tradition is a biannual peer-reviewed open access academic journal of philosophy published by Brill Publishers under the auspices of the International Society for Neoplatonic Studies. It was established in 1985 and the editor-in-chief is John F. Finamore (University of Iowa). Among the members of the Editorial Board are John Dillon, Gretchen Reydams-Schils, and Anne Sheppard. The journal is abstracted and indexed in the Humanities International Index, International Review of Biblical Studies, and Scopus.
