= Armagh City (UK Parliament constituency) =

UK parliamentary constituency in Ireland, 1801–1885

Armagh
- Former borough constituency for the House of Commons
- County: County Armagh
- Borough: Armagh

1801–1885
- Seats: 1
- Created from: Armagh (IHC)
- Replaced by: Mid Armagh

Armagh was an Irish constituency in the House of Commons of the United Kingdom from 1801 to 1885.

== History and boundaries ==
The parliamentary borough of Armagh in County Armagh was one of 33 Irish boroughs which were retained under the Acts of Union 1800. It was the successor to the two-seat constituency of Armagh in the Irish House of Commons. Its one MP in 1801 was chosen by lot to sit in the First Parliament of the United Kingdom.

A report into the boundaries of the borough of Armagh was undertaken in November 1831. Under the Parliamentary Boundaries (Ireland) Act 1832, it was defined as:

From Mr. Carroll's Windmill on the West of the City in a straight Line in the Direction of the Spire of Grange Church to the Point at which such straight Line cuts the new Dungannon Road; thence in a straight Line in the Direction of the Eastern Dome of the Observatory to the Point at which such straight Line cuts the Boundary of the Grounds attached to the Observatory; thence, Eastward, along the Boundary of the Grounds of the Observatory to the Point at which the same meets the Road to the Deanery; thence in a straight Line to the Magazine near the Infantry Barracks; thence in a straight Line, through a Point on the Rich Hill Road which is distant Twenty-five Yards (measured along the Rich Hill Road) to the East of the South-eastern Corner of the Infantry Barracks, to a Point which is One hundred and thirty Yards beyond the said Point on the Rich Hill Road; thence in a straight Line in the Direction of the South-eastern Angle of the Palace to the Point at which such straight Line cuts the Demesne Wall; thence, Northward, along the Demesne Wall to the Point at which the same leaves the Boundary of the Corporation Land; thence, Northward, along the Boundary of the Corporation Land to the Point at which the same meets the Monaghan Road; thence in a straight Line to Mr. Carroll's Windmill.

The constituency was disfranchised under the Redistribution of Seats Act 1885, which took effect at the 1885 general election. The borough of Armagh, as part of the barony of Armagh, became part of the county division of Mid Armagh.

== Members of Parliament ==
Election	Member	Party	Note
1801 (co-option)	Patrick Duigenan	Tory	
1801 (b)	Patrick Duigenan	Tory	Duigenan appointed commissioner of compensation
1802	Patrick Duigenan	Tory	
1806	Patrick Duigenan	Tory	
1807	Patrick Duigenan	Tory	
1812	Patrick Duigenan	Tory	
1816 (b)	Daniel Webb Webber	Tory	Death of Duigenan
1818	John Leslie Foster	Tory	Also returned for Lisburn. Sat for Armagh.
1820	William Stuart	Tory	
1826	Rt Hon. Henry Goulburn	Tory	
1828 (b)	Rt Hon. Henry Goulburn	Tory	Goulburn appointed Chancellor of the Exchequer
1830	Rt Hon. Henry Goulburn	Tory	
1831	Viscount Ingestre	Tory	
1831 (b)	Sir John Brydges	Tory	Ingestre resigned to contest Dublin
1832	Leonard Dobbin	Whig	
1835	Leonard Dobbin	Whig	
1837	William Curry	Whig	
1840 (b)	John Rawdon	Whig	Curry appointed Master in Chancery
1841	John Rawdon	Whig	
1847	John Rawdon	Whig	
1852	Ross Stephenson Moore	Conservative	
1855 (b)	Joshua Bond	Conservative	Death of Moore
1857	Stearne Miller	Conservative	
1859	Joshua Bond	Conservative	
1865	Stearne Miller	Conservative	
1867 (b)	John Vance	Conservative	Miller appointed judge in bankruptcy
1868	John Vance	Conservative	
1874	John Vance	Conservative	
1875 (b)	George Beresford	Conservative	Death of Vance
1880	George Beresford	Conservative	
1885	Area became part of Mid Armagh		

== Elections ==
=== Elections in the 1830s ===
General election, 11 August 1830: Armagh City
Party	Candidate	Votes	%
Tory	Henry Goulburn	Unopposed	
Registered electors		13	
Tory hold			

General election, 10 May 1831: Armagh City
Party	Candidate	Votes	%
Tory	Henry Chetwynd-Talbot	Unopposed	
Registered electors		13	
Tory hold			

Chetwynd-Talbot resigned to contest a by-election at Dublin City, causing a by-election.

By-election, 25 August 1831: Armagh City
Party	Candidate	Votes	%
Tory	John Brydges	Unopposed	
Registered electors		13	
Tory hold			

General election, 15 December 1832: Armagh City
Party	Candidate	Votes	%
Whig	Leonard Dobbin	218	53.0
Tory	Arthur Irwin Kelly	193	47.0
Majority		25	6.0
Turnout		411	92.6
Registered electors		444	
Whig gain from Tory			

General election, 15 January 1835: Armagh City
Party	Candidate	Votes	%	±%
Whig	Leonard Dobbin	197	54.7	+1.7
Conservative	Robert William Jackson	163	45.3	−1.7
Majority		34	9.4	+3.4
Turnout		360	66.5	−26.1
Registered electors		541		
Whig hold		Swing	+1.7	

General election, 7 August 1837: Armagh City
Party	Candidate	Votes	%	±%
Whig	William Curry	235	53.7	−1.0
Conservative	Joseph Kidd	203	46.3	+1.0
Majority		32	7.4	−2.0
Turnout		438	57.1	−9.4
Registered electors		767		
Whig hold		Swing	−1.0	

=== Elections in the 1840s ===
Curry resigned after being appointed a Master in Chancery, causing a by-election.

By-election, 22 May 1840: Armagh City
Party	Candidate	Votes	%	±%
Whig	John Rawdon	Unopposed		
Registered electors				
Whig hold				

General election, 5 July 1841: Armagh City
Party	Candidate	Votes	%	±%
Whig	John Rawdon	Unopposed		
Registered electors		892		
Whig hold				

General election, 31 July 1847: Armagh City
Party	Candidate	Votes	%	±%
Whig	John Rawdon	Unopposed		
Registered electors		838		
Whig hold				

=== Elections in the 1850s ===
General election, 9 July 1852: Armagh City
Party	Candidate	Votes	%	±%
Conservative	Ross Stephenson Moore	Unopposed		
Registered electors		318		
Conservative hold				

Moore's death caused a by-election.

By-election, 6 December 1855: Armagh City
Party	Candidate	Votes	%	±%
Conservative	Joshua Bond	186	55.9	N/A
Conservative	Thomas Ball Miller	147	44.1	N/A
Majority		39	11.8	N/A
Turnout		333	82.6	N/A
Registered electors		403		
Conservative hold		Swing	N/A	

General election, 2 April 1857: Armagh City
Party	Candidate	Votes	%	±%
Conservative	Stearne Miller	175	51.9	N/A
Conservative	Joshua Bond	162	48.1	N/A
Majority		13	3.8	N/A
Turnout		337	83.6	N/A
Registered electors		403		
Conservative hold		Swing	N/A	

General election, 5 May 1859: Armagh City
Party	Candidate	Votes	%	±%
Conservative	Joshua Bond	201	59.5	+11.4
Conservative	Stearne Miller	137	40.5	−11.4
Majority		64	19.0	+15.2
Turnout		338	82.8	−0.8
Registered electors		408		
Conservative hold		Swing	+11.4	

=== Elections in the 1860s ===
General election, 17 July 1865: Armagh City
Party	Candidate	Votes	%	±%
Conservative	Stearne Miller	184	52.1	+11.6
Liberal	William Kirk	169	47.9	New
Majority		15	4.2	−14.8
Turnout		353	86.3	+3.5
Registered electors		409		
Conservative hold		Swing	N/A	

Miller was appointed a judge in bankruptcy, causing a by-election.

By-election, 30 January 1867: Armagh City
Party	Candidate	Votes	%	±%
Conservative	John Vance	Unopposed		
Conservative hold				

General election, 17 November 1868: Armagh City
Party	Candidate	Votes	%	±%
Conservative	John Vance	Unopposed		
Registered electors		603		
Conservative hold				

=== Elections in the 1870s ===
General election 9 April 1874: Armagh City
Party	Candidate	Votes	%	±%
Conservative	John Vance	325	60.3	N/A
Liberal	George C Cochrane	214	39.7	New
Majority		111	20.6	N/A
Turnout		539	90.4	N/A
Registered electors		596		
Conservative hold				

Vance died, causing a by-election.

By-election, 18 Oct 1875: Armagh City
Party	Candidate	Votes	%	±%
Conservative	George Beresford	278	53.0	N/A
Conservative	William Squire Barker Kaye	247	47.0	N/A
Majority		31	6.0	N/A
Turnout		525	88.1	−2.3
Registered electors		596		
Conservative hold				

=== Elections in the 1880s ===
General election 9 April 1880: Armagh City
Party	Candidate	Votes	%	±%
Conservative	George Beresford	Unopposed		
Registered electors		657		
Conservative hold				
