= Brian Murdoch =

Brian Murdoch may refer to:

- Brian H. Murdoch (1930–2020), Irish mathematician
- Brian O. Murdoch (born 1944), emeritus professor at the University of Stirling, Scotland
