= Ahuvia Kahane =

Israeli classicist working in Ireland

- Born: Haifa, Israel
- Education: Tel Aviv University (BA); Balliol College, Oxford (DPhil)
- Occupation: Academic
- Organization: Trinity College Dublin
- Title: Regius Professor of Greek (1761) and A. G. Leventis Professor of Greek Culture (2017)
- Predecessor: Brian McGing

Ahuvia Kahane is a British classical scholar, known especially for his work on Homeric epic. He is the 17th Regius Professor of Greek (1763) and the first A. G. Leventis Professor of Greek Culture (2017) at Trinity College Dublin and a professorial Fellow of the College.

== Biography ==
Kahane was born on an agricultural commune (kibbutz), Ramat Yohanan in the north of Israel. His father was Reuven Kahane (1931-2003), a professor of sociology, Fellow of the Harry S. Truman Research Institute for the Advancement of Peace and Saul Robinson Chair at the Hebrew University in Jerusalem. His mother was Orna, née Smirin, an artist and editor who, following a divorce, married Magnum Photos photographer Micha Bar-Am. Kahane's grandparents were among the founders of the kibbutzim movement and of Beit Alpha and Kineret in northern Israel. His paternal grandfather, David Kahane, served in Ben Gurion's government.

In 1960, Ahuvia Kahane left the kibbutz with his father, who had remarried the educator Israela, née Shochat. He attended Rehavia school in Jerusalem and Cornell School in Berkeley, California. As a teenager, Kahane was a member of Mazpen (‘Compass’) a socialist, anti-Zionist organization that had splintered from the Israeli Communist Party.

Kahane studied Greek and Latin in the Department of Classics at the University of Tel-Aviv, working with linguist H. B. Rosen, John Glucker and other scholars. He obtained his BA in 1983. As an undergraduate, Kahane worked closely with many contemporary artists, poets and writers, editing various works including, e.g. the Hebrew language versions of Daphnis and Chloe (by J. Bronowski) and Polybius' Histories (by B. Shimron), translating and publishing in literary journals such as Siman Kri'a, Achshav (‘עכשיו’) and Prosa (magazine). In 1982, he was commissioned by Keter Publishers to produce a new Hebrew prose translation of Homer's poems (Keter 1996).

In 1984, Kahane moved to the UK. He then studied for his doctorate at Balliol College, Oxford under the supervision of Jasper Griffin, as well as serving as Lecturer in Classics between 1987 and 1990. He obtained his doctorate in 1990. During this period Kahane also became associated with the Oxford Centre for Hebrew and Jewish Studies and began work with N. S. Doniach, OBE and a team of lexicographers at Oxford University Press on the Oxford English-Hebrew Dictionary, a project which he co-edited with Doniach and brought to completion shortly after Doniach's death in 1996. From 1990 to 1993 Kahane was a Junior Research Fellow at St. Cross College, Oxford and at the Oxford Centre for Hebrew and Jewish Studies. From 1993 to 1994 Kahane was a Junior Fellow at the Center for Hellenic Studies at Harvard University.

In 1994, Kahane was appointed Assistant Professor of Classics at Northwestern University, where he obtained tenure as Associate Professor in 2000. In 2003, he became chairman of the Department of Classics. During this period Kahane maintained an appointment as Senior Associate at the Centre for Hebrew Studies in Oxford, a position he continues to hold. He co-founded (1998, with S. Sara Monoson) the Classical Traditions Initiative at Northwestern and worked closely with the Alice Kaplan Institute for the Humanities.

In 2004 Kahane took up an appointment as Professor of Classics at Royal Holloway, University of London, where he was also associate director of the University of London Institute in Paris (2006-8), Director of the Humanities and Arts Research Institute (2005–11), Head of the Classics Department (2012-2015) and co-director of the Centre for the Reception of Greece and Rome (2007–19).

In 2019, Kahane was appointed Regius Professor of Greek (1761) and A. G. Leventis Professor of Greek Culture (2017) at Trinity College Dublin. In 2026, he was made a member of the Royal Irish Academy.

He is also Senior Associate at the Oxford Centre for Hebrew and Jewish Studies at the University of Oxford. Kahane is a Member of the Academia Europaea, a Fellow of the Royal Historical Society and other learned organizations.

== Scholarly work ==
Kahane's work addresses questions of form and content, continuity and change, authority and the ethics of literary reflection. He has made contributions to the study of Greco-Roman antiquity and early Greek epic, orality and oral traditions, literary history, modern poetry and poetics, visual culture and modern art, Hebrew studies, lexicography, sociology and anthropology, translation and translation studies.

== Personal life ==
He married Georgina Calvert-Lee, a barrister, in 1992. They have three children, Berenike, Erasmus and Lysander.

Kahane is a Freeman of the City of Durham, England.

== Publications ==
- Oral Theory, Complexity and Homeric Epic (forthcoming, 2027) Berlin: De Gruyter).
- A Cultural History of Time in Antiquity (forthcoming 2026) London: Bloomsbury.
- Epic, Novel and the Progress of Antiquity (2025) London: Bloomsbury.
- Walking in Cities: Navigating Post-Pandemic Urban Environments (edited with J. Joseph Lester, E. Leslie and S. King) (2024) New York: Routledge.
- The Gods in Greek Hexameter Poetry and Beyond (edited with J. Clauss and M. Cuypers) (2016) Stuttgart: F. Steiner Verlag. ISBN ISBN 978-3-515-11523-0
- Homer: Guide for the Perplexed (2012) London: Continuum/Bloomsbury. ISBN 9781441173065
- Social Order and Informal Codes (in Hebrew), with T. Rappoport, (2012) Jerusalem: Resling Publishers.
- Antiquity and the Ruin, Revue européenne d'histoire Vol. 18.5-6 (2011), (special double-issue).
- Diachronic Dialogues: Continuity and Authority in Homer and the Homeric Tradition in series "Greek Studies, Interdisciplinary Approaches" (2005), (Lanham, MD: Rowman and Littlefield.
- A Companion to the Prologue to Apuleius’ Metamorphoses (edited with A. J. W. Laird) (2001) Oxford: Oxford University Press.
- The Chicago Homer with M. Mueller, C. Berry W. Parod (2000) Evanston, IL: Northwestern University.
- Written Voices, Spoken Signs: Tradition, Performance and the Epic Text (edited with E. J. Bakker) (1997) (Cambridge, MA: Harvard University Press.
- The Oxford English Hebrew Dictionary (edited with N. S. Doniach) (1996) (Oxford: Oxford University Press.
- Homer: Odyssey (in Hebrew) (1996) (Jerusalem: Keter Publishers).
- The Interpretation of Order: A Study in the Poetics of Homeric Repetition (1994) (Oxford: Oxford University Press 9780198140771.

Academic offices
Preceded by Brian McGing	Regius Professor of Greek at Trinity College Dublin; 2019–	Succeeded by incumbent
