= Charles Rowe =

Charles Rowe may refer to:

- Charles Rowe (cricketer) (born 1951), Hong Kong cricketer
- Charles Rowe (footballer) (1882–1959), Australian rules footballer
- Charles Henry Rowe (1893–1943), Irish mathematician
