= Isabel Marion Weir Johnston =

First woman to enter Trinity College, Dublin

- Born: Marion Johnston; 25 November 1883; Derry, Ireland
- Died: June 1969 (aged 85); Islington, London, England
- Education: Trinity College Dublin

Isabel Marion Weir Johnston (1883–1969), known as Marrion Kelleher (née Johnston), was the first woman to enter Trinity College, Dublin (TCD) in January 1904.

== Family ==
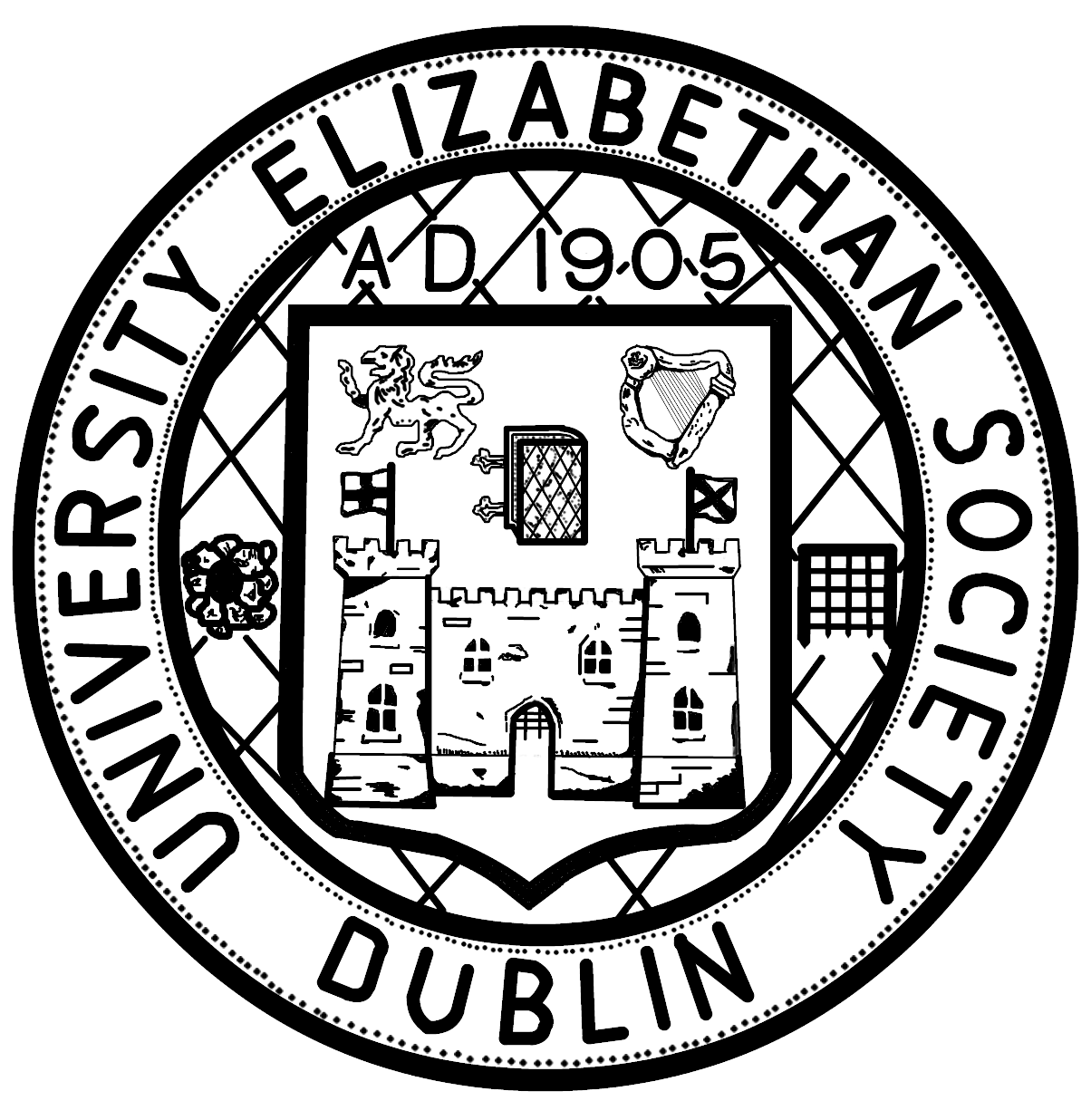
DU Elizabethan Society Crest

Johnston was born 25 November 1883 in Derry City in Ireland to a Presbyterian family. Her father John Barr Johnston (1843 - 1919) was a knight, a merchant, as well as an alderman, mayor and justice of the peace from Tyrone. Her mother was Isabella Weir from Donegal. She had an older brother, John Alexander, who studied law, an older sister Margaret Chambers who became a secretary and a younger sister Kathleen Maude. In 1901 she applied to the King's Inns, but was rejected by a small majority.

== Trinity College Dublin ==
TCD had struggled for some time with the issue of allowing women to attend Trinity. The long serving Provost, distinguished mathematician George Salmon, had long opposed the admission of women. He is alleged to have said that women would only be admitted to TCD as students over his dead body. The Board voted in favour of allowing women to enter the university in 1902. In 1903, when the Lord Lieutenant said that the Provost's assent was required, Salmon withdrew his formal objections. Coincidentally, immediately after his death on Friday, 22 January 1904, Johnston became the first woman undergraduate to succeed in registering at TCD, and by the end of year other women had done likewise. She recalled, "When I arrived in Dublin 1904, I was informed that he [Salmon] had died that day, and the examination had to be put off until after the funeral."

During her first two terms, she was not allowed to attend lectures and took the terms by examination, during which she was chaperoned.

Johnston was the first woman to enter TCD where she read English and French. She was followed later the same year by the next women undergraduates, Ellen Tuckey and Avarina Shegog. She founded the women's debating society, The Dublin University Elizabethan Society, in 1905. Although "an active and able student" Johnston left before finishing her degree due to ill health and marriage. She married Stephen B. Kelleher, a mathematician and Catholic from Cork, who was made a Fellow in 1904. Kelleher was the only Roman Catholic Fellow in the university at the time. Kelleher became the Erasmus Smith's Professor of Mathematics in Trinity for 1914-1917. The family later moved to England where Johnston became a founder member of the London branch of the DU Women graduates association.
