= Henry Hickman Harte =

Irish mathematician and clergyman

Henry Hickman Harte (1790–1848) was an Irish mathematician and clergyman.

== Life ==
Harte, the son of a solicitor, was born in the county of Limerick, Ireland in 1790.

He entered Trinity College Dublin in 1806, and became a Scholar in 1809. He earned his BA in 1811 (and MA in 1823). He served as the Donegall Lecturer in Mathematics from 1827 to 1832.

In 1831 Harte accepted the college living of Cappagh, diocese of Derry, co. Tyrone. He died on Sunday, 5 April 1848, having preached on the same day in his church, where he was also buried.

== Publications ==
Harte translated Laplace's Système du Monde. He also added 'Mathematical Proofs and Explanatory Remarks,' Dublin, 1830.

He published a translation of Poisson's Mécanique, with Notes, 2 vols. London, 1842, 8vo.

He commenced another of Laplace's Mécanique Céleste.

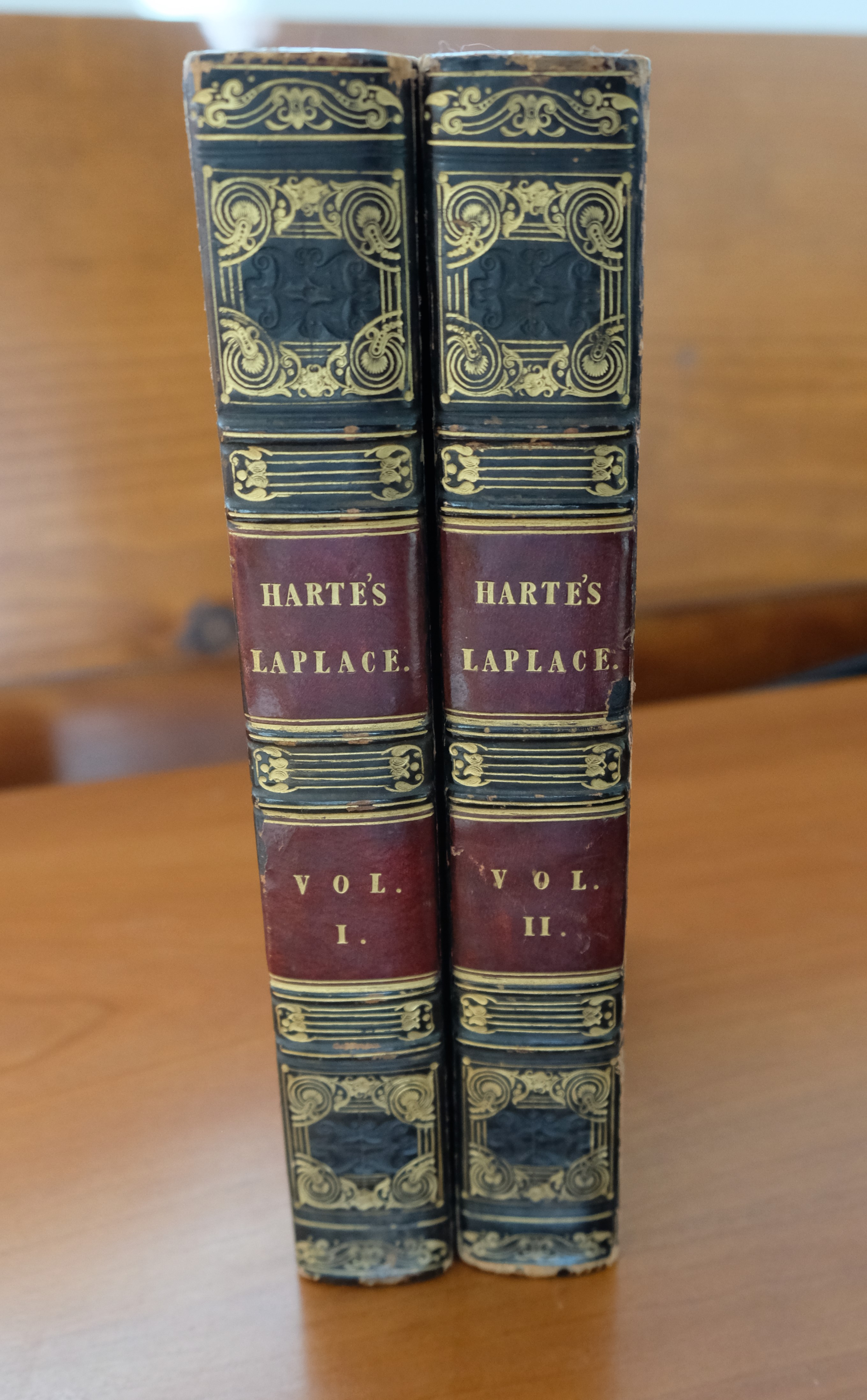
Volumes 1 and 2 of Pierre-Simon Laplace's "System of the World" (1830), translated and with commentary by Harte

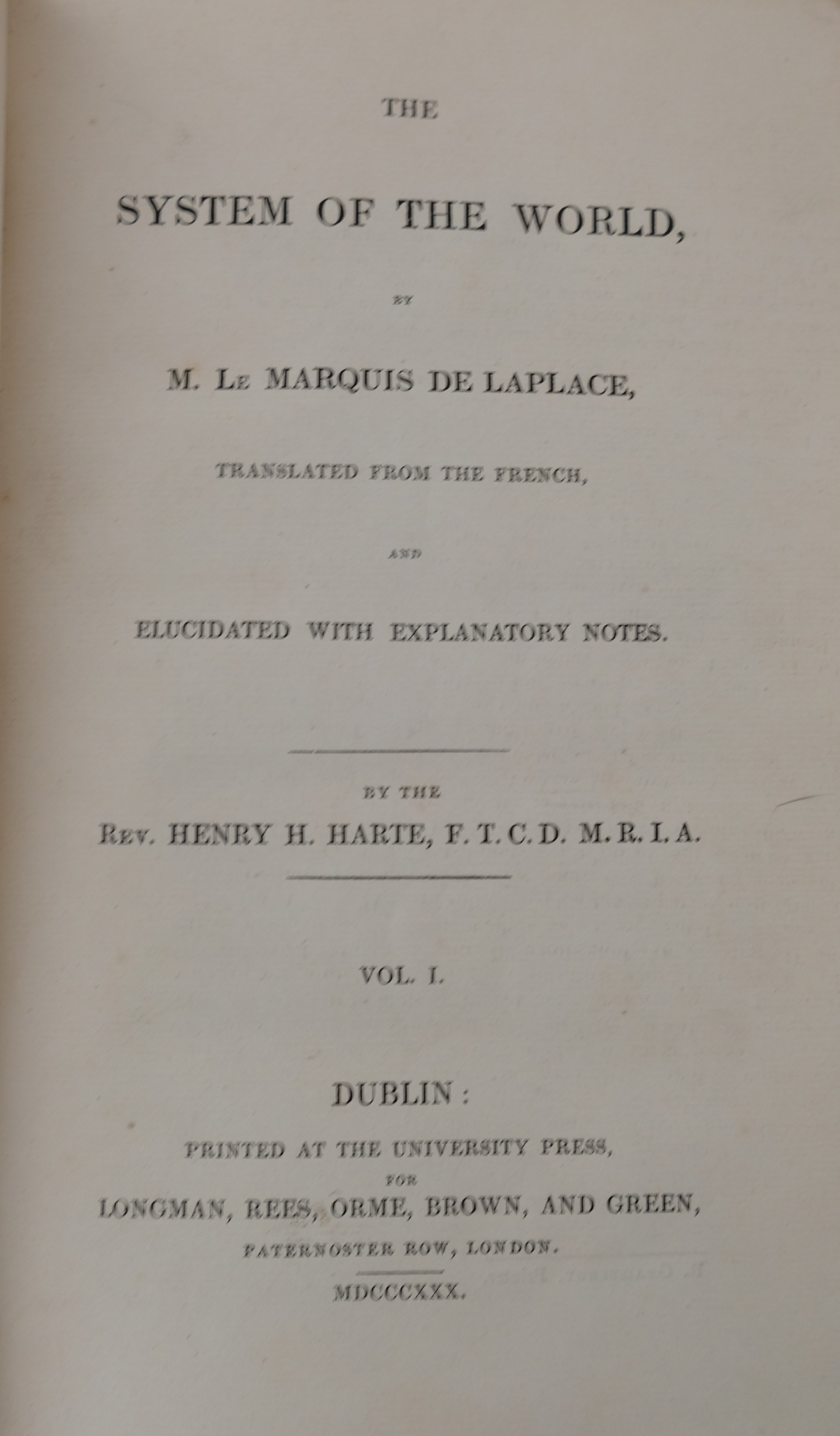
Title page to Volume 1 of Pierre-Simon Laplace's "System of the World" (1830), translated and with commentary by Harte
