= T. S. Broderick =

Irish mathematician

TS "Stan" Broderick (22 May 1893 – 4 April 1962) was an Irish mathematician and academic who served as Erasmus Smith's Professor of Mathematics (1944-1962) at Trinity College Dublin (TCD). He was the father of Irish academic Edna Longley.

== Life and career ==
Timothy Stanislaus Broderick was born in Youghal, Cork. He studied mathematics at University College Cork (BA 1913, MA 1916) where he won a National University of Ireland Travelling Studentship Prize in 1916. He then went to TCD where he was a mathematics Scholar (1917) and got a BA in Mathematical and Experimental Physics (1918). After teaching for a few years in Exeter in England, he was appointed to the staff at TCD, serving as Donegall Lecturer (1926-1943) and then Erasmus Smith's Professor of Mathematics (1944-1962). In 1930 he became a Fellow of TCD, in 1958 a Senior Fellow, and in 1959 acting Vice Provost.

== Selected papers ==
- Broderick, T. S.; Schrödinger, E. Boolean algebra and probability theory. Proc. Roy. Irish Acad. Sect. A 46, (1940). 103–112.
- Broderick, T. S.; On proving certain properties of the primes by means of the methods of pure number theory. Proc. Roy. Irish Acad. Sect. A 46, (1940). 17–24.
- Broderick, T. S.; On obtaining an estimate of the frequency of the primes by means of the elementary properties of the integers. J. London Math. Soc. 14 (1939). 303–310.
