= Robert Russell (Irish mathematician) =

Irish mathematician

Robert Russell (c. 1858–18 May 1938) was an Irish mathematician and academic at Trinity College Dublin (TCD), who served as Erasmus Smith's Professor of Mathematics (1917–1921).

Robert Russell was born in Portadown, County Armagh, and was educated at Santry School, Portarlington, County Laois. He attended TCD, became a Scholar in 1877, and won the Brooke Prize, Bishop Law's Prize, McCullagh Prize, and Madden Prize. He was awarded BA in mathematics (1880), became a Fellow a few years later, and got his MA (1888). In 1887, he was elected a member of the London Mathematical Society. He spent his whole career at TCD, at various times serving as Junior Bursar, Junior Dean, Registrar of Chambers, and from the early 1920s on, Senior Bursar.

He was Donegall Lecturer in Mathematics (1904–1907), Erasmus Smith's Professor of Mathematics (1917–1921), and became Senior Fellow in 1920.

== Selected papers ==
- Geometry of Surfaces Derived from Cubics, 26 June 1899
- Ruler Constructions in Connexion with Cubic Curves, 24 April 1893
- On a Theorem in Higher Algebra, The Quarterly Journal of Pure and Applied Mathematics, Volume 21, 23 May 2016
