= William S. Burnside =

Irish mathematician

- Born: 20 December 1839
- Died: 11 March 1920 (aged 80)

Academic background
- Education: Trinity College Dublin

Academic work
- Discipline: Mathematics
- Institutions: Trinity College Dublin

William Snow Burnside (20 December 1839 – 11 March 1920) was an Irish mathematician whose entire career was spent at Trinity College Dublin (TCD). He is chiefly remembered for the book The Theory of Equations: With an Introduction to the Theory of Binary Algebraic Forms (1881) and his long tenure as Erasmus Smith's Professor of Mathematics at TCD. He is sometimes confused with his rough contemporary, the English mathematician William Burnside.

William Snow Burnside was born at Corcreevy House, near Fivemiletown, Tyrone, to William Smyth Burnside (1810–1884, Chancellor of Clogher Cathedral) and Anne Henderson (1808–1881). He studied mathematics under George Salmon at TCD (BA 1861, MA 1866, Fellowship 1871), and taught there until his retirement in 1917. He served as Erasmus Smiths's Professor of Mathematics for many decades (1879–1913), and co-authored the influential 1881 book The Theory of Equations: With an Introduction to the Theory of Binary Algebraic Forms with his TCD colleague Arthur William Panton (1843–1906). It ran to at least 7 editions, and was reissued by Dover Books in 1960. TCD awarded him a DSc in 1891. He lived one and a half miles away from campus, on Raglan Road, and was allegedly "the last man to regularly arrive in College on horseback".
