= Brian McGing =

Irish papyrologist and historian

Brian Charles McGing is a papyrologist and ancient historian, who specialises in the Hellenistic period. He was Regius Professor of Greek at Trinity College, Dublin until his retirement in 2017. He served as editor of the college's journal of the classical world, Hermathena.

In 2004, McGing was elected a Member of the Royal Irish Academy (MRIA).

== Selected publications ==
- Polybius' Histories. Oxford University Press, Oxford, 2010.
- The limits of ancient biography. Classical Press of Wales, 2006. (ed. with Judith Mossman)
- "Population and proselytism. How many Jews were there in the ancient world?" in John R. Barlett (ed.), Jews in the Hellenistic and Roman cities. London, 2002. pp. 88–106.
- "Revolt Egyptian style: Internal opposition to Ptolemaic rule", Archiv für Papyrusforschung und Verwandte Gebiete, 43 (1997), pp. 273–314.
- Greek papyri from Dublin. Bonn, 1995.
- "Appian's Mithridateios", Aufstieg und Niedergang der Römischen Welt II, 34.1, Bonn, 1993. pp. 496–522.
- "Melitian monks at Labla", Tyche 5 (1990), pp. 67–94.
- The foreign policy of Mithridates VI Eupator King of Pontus. Leiden, 1986.

Academic offices
| Preceded by John M. Dillon | Regius Professor of Greek at Trinity College Dublin; 2006–2017 | Succeeded by Ahuvia Kahane |
