= John Rawdon =

Member of Parliament for Armagh City
- In office 22 May 1840 – 9 July 1852
- Preceded by: William Curry
- Succeeded by: Ross Stephenson Moore

Personal details
- Born: 1804
- Died: 5 May 1866 (aged 61–62)
- Party: Whig

John Dawson Rawdon (1804 – 5 May 1866) was an Irish Whig politician and army officer.

He was elected Whig MP for Armagh City at a by-election in 1840—caused by the resignation of William Curry—and held the seat until 1852 when he did not seek re-election.

Rawdon also attained the army ranks of Lieutenant Colonel and Colonel and, in 1828, married Lady Dowager Cremorne.

Parliament of the United Kingdom
Preceded by William Curry	Member of Parliament for Armagh City; 1840–1852	Succeeded by Ross Stephenson Moore
