= 1875 Armagh City by-election =

UK Parliamentary by-election

The 1875 Armagh City by-election was held on 18 October 1875. The by-election was fought due to the death of the incumbent Conservative MP, John Vance. It was won by the Conservative candidate George Beresford.

By-election, 18 Oct 1875: Armagh City
Party	Candidate	Votes	%	±%
Conservative	George Beresford	278	53.0	N/A
Conservative	William Squire Barker Kaye	247	47.0	N/A
Majority		31	6.0	N/A
Turnout		525	88.1	−2.3
Registered electors		596		
Conservative hold				
