= George Beresford (Armagh MP) =

British politician (1831–1906)

George de la Poer Beresford (22 April 1831 – 3 August 1906) was an Anglo-Irish Conservative politician.

Beresford was the son of the Most Reverend Marcus Beresford, Archbishop of Armagh, son of the Right Reverend George Beresford, Bishop of Kilmore and Ardagh, son of John Beresford, younger son of Marcus Beresford, 1st Earl of Tyrone. His mother was Mary, daughter of Henry Peisley L'Estrange.

He was appointed High Sheriff of Cavan for 1865. He was elected to the House of Commons for Armagh City in an 1875 by-election, a seat he held until 1885, when the constituency was abolished. In 1887, he was appointed High Sheriff of Armagh.

Beresford married Mary Annabella, daughter of Reverend William Vernon Harcourt and sister of Sir William Vernon Harcourt, in 1860. He died in August 1906, aged 75. His wife survived him by eleven years and died in July 1917.

== See also ==
- Marquess of Waterford

== Notes ==
Parliament of the United Kingdom
Preceded by John Vance	Member of Parliament for Armagh City; 1875 – 1885	Constituency abolished
