= Sarah Longley =

Northern Irish painter (born 1975)

- Born: 1975 (age 50–51); Belfast, Northern Ireland
- Education: Manchester Metropolitan University; Edinburgh College of Art
- Known for: Painting

Sarah Longley (born 1975) is a painter from Belfast, Northern Ireland. She currently lives and works in Lochalsh, Scotland. Her work has been displayed at the Royal Ulster Academy, the Royal Scottish Academy and the Royal Hibernian Academy.

== Life ==
Born in Belfast, Sarah Longley is the daughter of the poet Michael Longley and the literary critic Edna Longley (née Broderick). Longley studied at Manchester Metropolitan University and subsequently trained at the Edinburgh College of Art.

Her work is characterised by dynamic, lively use of colour and an expressive, personal response to her subjects, which include still life, landscape and portraits. She has also created work in response to her father’s poetry collections Sea Asters (2015), The Dipper’s Range (2016) Angel Hill (2017) and Ghetto (2019).

In a review of a solo exhibition for the Irish Times, Aidan Dunne wrote, "The strength of her work rests not only on her assiduous attention to the demands of each area of subject matter, but also, very much, on the consistency of her dark-edged vision".

Her work has been displayed at the Royal Ulster Academy, the Royal Scottish Academy and at the Royal Hibernian Academy.
