= Donegall Lectureship at Trinity College Dublin =

Endowed chair at Trinity College Dublin

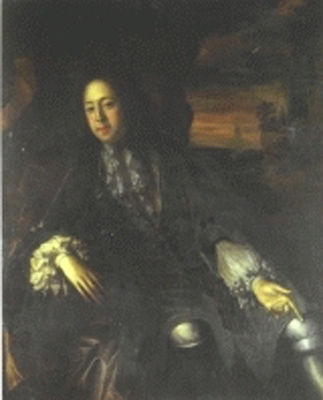
The 3rd Earl of Donegall.

The Donegall Lecturership at Trinity College Dublin is one of two endowed mathematics positions at Trinity College Dublin (TCD), the other being the Erasmus Smith's Chair of Mathematics. The Donegall (sometimes spelt Donegal) Lectureship was endowed in 1668 by the 3rd Earl of Donegall. In 1675, after the restoration, it was combined with the previous public Professor in Mathematics position that had been created in 1652 by the Commonwealth parliament.

For much of its history, the Donegall Lectureship was awarded to a mathematician as an additional honour which came with a supplementary income. Since 1967, the lectureship has been awarded to a leading international scientist who visits the Department of Pure and Applied Mathematics and gives talks, including a public lecture called the Donegall Lecture.

== List of Donegall Lecturers ==
=== Permanent Donegall lecturers (before 1967) ===
- 1675–1685: Miles Symner (1610?–1686)
- 1685–1692: St. George Ashe (1657–1718)
- 1692–1694: Charles Willoughby (1630?–1694)
- 1694–1696: Edward Smyth (1665–1720)
- 1696–1723: Claudius Gilbert (1670–1743)
- 1723–1730: Richard Helsham (1682–1738)
- 1730–1731: Charles Stuart (circa 1698–1746)
- 1731–1734: Lambert Hughes (1698–1771)
- 1734–1735: Robert Shawe (1699?–1752)
- 1735–1738: Caleb Cartwright (1696?–1763)
- 1738–1747: John Pellisier (1703–1781)
- 1747–1750: John Whittingham (1712–1778)
- 1750–1759: William Clement (1707–1782)
- 1759–1760: Theaker Wilder (1717–1777)
- 1760–1762: John Stokes (1720?–1781)
- 1762–1764: Richard Murray (1725?–1799)
- 1764–1769: Henry Joseph Dabzac (1737–1790)
- 1769–1770: Henry Ussher (1741–1790)
- 1770–1782: Gerald Fitzgerald (1739?–1819)
- 1782–1786: Matthew Young (1750–1800)
- 1786–1790: Digby Marsh (1750?–1791)
- 1790–1795: Thomas Elrington (1760–1835)
- 1795–1800: Whitley Stokes (1763–1845)
- 1800–1807: Robert Phipps (1765?–1844)
- 1807–1820: James Wilson (1774?–1829)
- 1820–1827: Richard MacDonnell (1787–1867)
- 1827–1832: Henry Harte (1790–1848)
- 1832–1847: Thomas Luby (1800–1870)
- 1847–1858: Andrew Hart (1811–1890)
- 1858–1867: George Salmon (1819–1904)
- 1867–1876: William Roberts (1817–1883)
- 1876–1884: Benjamin Williamson (1828–1916)
- 1884–1904: Arthur Panton (1843–1906)
- 1904–1907: Robert Russell (1858?–1938)
- 1917–1923: Reginald Rogers (1874–1923)
- 1923–1926: Charles Rowe (1893–1943)
- 1926–1944: TS (Stan) Broderick (1893–1962)

=== Visiting Donegall Lecturers (since 1967) ===
- 1967–1968: Paul Halmos (1916–2006) Spinsters, sequences and the Schroeder-Berstein theorem
- 1969–1970: James Hamilton (1918–2000) Discrete symmetry properties and elementary particles
- 1970–1971: Friedrich Hirzebruch (1927–2012) Some relations between topology and number theory
- 1971–1972: Ailsa Land (1927–2021) Mathematical programming
- 1972–1973: Dennis Sciama (1926–1999) Black holes and the future of astronomy
- 1976–1977: Christopher Zeeman (1925–2016) Introduction to catastrophe theory
- 1978–1979: Dennis Lindley (1923–2013) Decision making, probability and the law
- 1979–1980: Heini Halberstam (1926–2014) The formation of mathematical concepts: the vibrating string controversy
- 1982–1983: Lior Tzafriri (1936–2008) New results and problems in the geometry of normed spaces
- 1983–1984: Marc Yor (1949–2014) Brownian Motion
- 1985–1986: Roy Kerr (born 1934) Black holes
- 1986–1987: Wilhelm Kaup Jordan algebras and analysis
- 1988–1989: T. J. Willmore Variational problems for surfaces
- 1989–1990: Jacob Schwartz (1930–2009) Mathematical problems in neuroscience and neural nets
- 1991–1992: Donald Knuth (born 1938) Stable husbands
- 1994–1995: Freeman Dyson (born 1923) The evolution of science
- 1996–1997: Christopher Isham (born 1944) The challenge of quantum gravity
- 1997–1998: James Lighthill (1924–1998) A century of shock waves
- 1998–1999: Michael Berry (born 1941) Seven wonders of physics
- 1999–2000: Chen Nigh Yang (1922–2025)
- 2000–2001: Robbert Dijkgraaf (born 1960) The unreasonable effectiveness of physics in modern mathematics
- 2002–2003: David Gross (born 1941) The coming revolutions in physics
- 2003–2004: Ludwig Faddeev (1934–2017) Development of physics from a mathematical point of view
- 2005–2010: Tony Bell A view of theoretical neuroscience and machine learning
- 2010: Ludvig Faddeev (1934–2017)
