= Ellen Tuckey =

One of the first three women to enter Trinity College, Dublin

- Born: Ellen Marguerite Tuckey; 4 February 1884; Dublin, Ireland
- Died: 22 May 1939 (aged 55); Dublin, Ireland
- Education: Trinity College Dublin

Ellen Marguerite Tuckey (4 February 1884 – 22 May 1939) was one of the first three women to enter Trinity College, Dublin, in 1904, with Avarina Shegog after Marion Johnston.

== Biography ==
Ellen, or Elsie as she was also known, was born on 4 February 1884 to Ellen Elizabeth Orpen and Davys Tuckey, barrister-at-law, and Assistant Land Commissioner in Dublin city. She had two brothers, Charles Orpen Tuckey and Arthur Davys Tuckey. She was educated in Trinity College Dublin, joining Marion Johnston in the summer term in 1904.

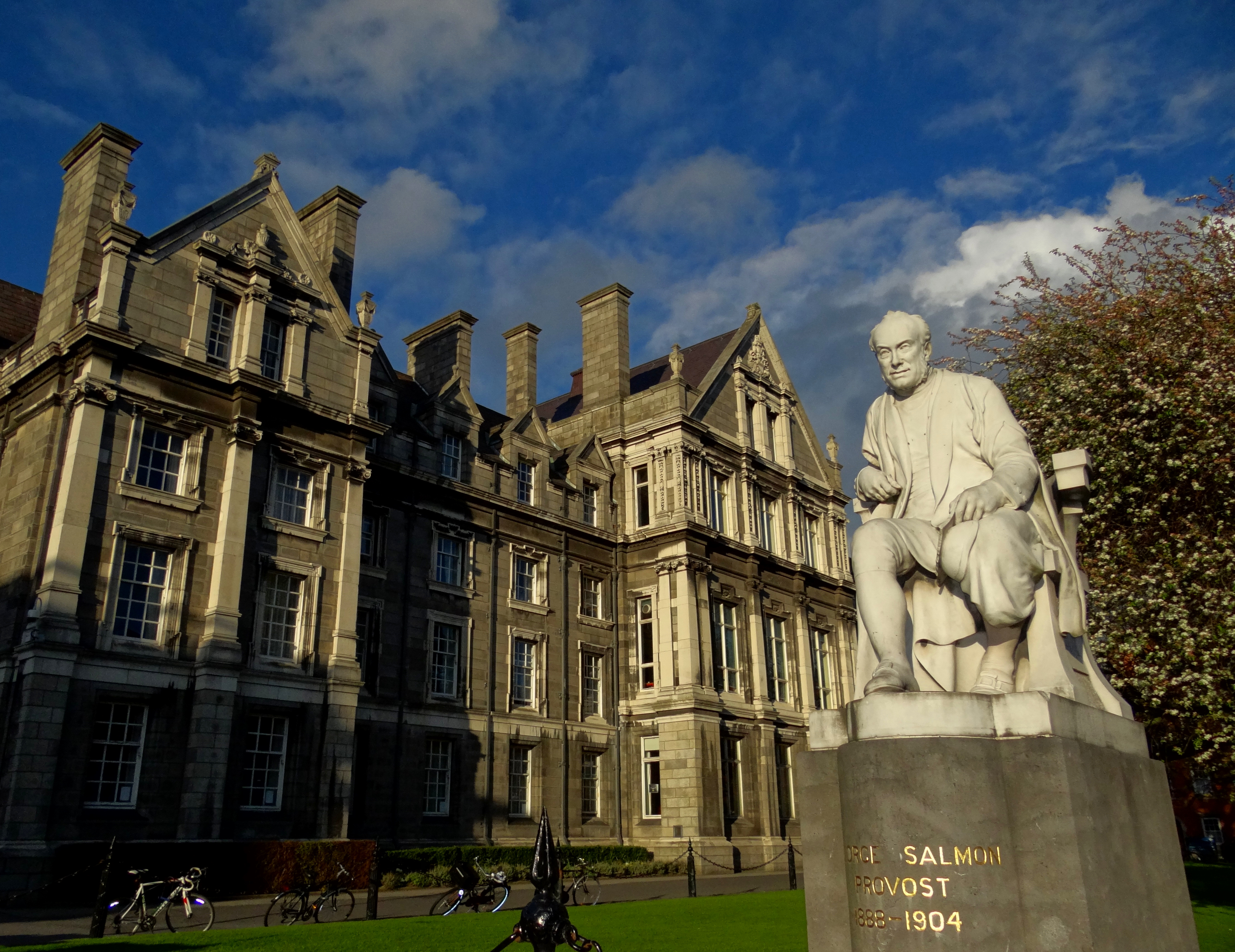
Provost George Salmon reputedly said women would enter Trinity over his dead body.

She graduated with a B.A., Senior Moderator in Literature, in 1907. She went on to gain the teaching diploma and spent time studying in Bryn Mawr College in the United States.

Tuckey taught for several years in both India and Canada, before returning to Dublin to become Head Mistress of the Masonic Female Orphan School of Ireland, Ballsbridge, Dublin.

She died unexpectedly aged 56 on 22 May 1939.
