= Edna Longley =

Irish literary critic and cultural commentator

- Born: 1940 (age 85–86); Cork, Ireland
- Education: Trinity College Dublin
- Occupation: Literary critic

Edna Mary Longley, CBE FBA (born 1940) is an Irish literary critic and cultural commentator specialising in modern Irish and British poetry.

== Early life and education ==
Born in Cork in 1940, the daughter of mathematics professor T. S. Broderick and a Scottish Presbyterian mother, she was baptised a Catholic but brought up in "the Anglican compromise" (Church of Ireland). She went up to Trinity College Dublin in 1958 where her contemporaries included the poets Michael Longley, Derek Mahon and Eavan Boland.

After her marriage to Michael Longley, she moved with him to Belfast and obtained her first teaching post at Queen's University Belfast. From 1989 to 1994 she was Academic Director of the John Hewitt Summer School. Trinity College Dublin gave her an honorary doctorate in 2003. The artist Sarah Longley is her daughter.

In Jan 2012 Queen's recognised her importance to the academic life of the university with the unveiling of a portrait of Longley in the Great Hall. Professor Terence Brown, who unveiled the portrait, described her as "one of the foremost public intellectuals that Ireland has produced."

== Academic and critic ==
Now Professor Emerita at Queen's University Belfast, as a lecturer and later Professor of English at Queen's, Longley was influential in both literary and political culture of Northern Ireland both during and since the years of The Troubles.

While she was at the Queen's University, the Seamus Heaney Centre for Poetry was founded. She gained particular renown in Ireland for her public criticism of "depredatory ideologies" both in their political and the literary aspects. In her Lip pamphlet From Cathleen to Anorexia (1990) she was scathingly critical of the identification of feminism with Irish nationalism.

At the Yeats Summer School in 1993 she attacked The Field Day Anthology of Irish Writing for 'a propensity to censorship and an obsession with colonialism', developing those arguments in her 1994 collection of essays The Living Stream: Literature and Revisionism in Ireland, an extended critique of nationalism in Irish writing. She has also been one of the foremost scholars in Edward Thomas studies, publishing two editions of his poetry (1973 and 2008) and one of his prose (1981), and is one of the editors of the planned Oxford University Press series Edward Thomas: The Essential Prose. Writing in Dublin's Sunday Business Post, Seamus Heaney called her 2008 Annotated Collected Poems the "definitive new edition of Edward Thomas...a crowning achievement by Thomas's best advocate".

Longley famously stated that Irish history ought to be treated by "raising a monument to Amnesia, and forgetting where we put it".

== Honors and awards ==
- British Academy Fellow (2006)
- American Academy of Arts and Sciences - International Honorary Member (2019)
- Honorary Commander of the Order of the British Empire (CBE) (2024) for services to Academia and the Arts

== Works ==
=== Literary criticism ===
- Poetry in the Wars (Bloodaxe Books, 1986)
- Louis MacNeice: A Study (Faber & Faber, 1988)
- From Cathleen to Anorexia: The Breakdown of Ireland, Lip pamphlet (Attic Press, Dublin, 1990)
- The Living Stream: Literature and Revisionism in Ireland (Bloodaxe Books, 1994)
- Gender and the Irish Identity (Bloodaxe Books, 1996)
- Poetry and Posterity (Bloodaxe Books, 2000)
- Multiculturalism: The View from the Two Irelands (with Declan Kiberd) (Cork University Press, 2001)
- ‘The Great War, History and the English Lyric', in Vincent Sherry (editor), The Cambridge Companion to the Literature of the First World War (Cambridge University Press, 2005)
- Under the Same Moon: Edward Thomas and the English Lyric (Enitharmon Press, 2017)

=== As editor ===
- Edward Thomas: Poems and Last Poems (Macmillan, 1973)
- The Selected James Simmons (Blackstaff Press, 1978)
- The Selected Paul Durcan (Blackstaff Press, 1982)
- A Language Not to Be Betrayed: Selected Prose of Edward Thomas (Carcanet Press, 1981).
- Across a Roaring Hill: The Protestant Imagination in Modern Ireland, with Gerald Dawe (Blackstaff Press, 1985)
- Marin Sorescu: The Biggest Egg in the World (Bloodaxe Books, 1987)
- Dorothy Hewett: Alice in Wormland: Selected Poems (Bloodaxe Books, 1990)
- Culture in Ireland: Division or Diversity?: proceedings of the Cultures of Ireland Group Conference, 27–28 September 1991 (Institute of Irish Studies, 1991)
- Yeats Annual No.12: That Accusing Eye - Yeats and His Irish Readers (co-editor) (Palgrave, 1996)
- The Bloodaxe Book of 20th Century Poetry from Britain and Ireland (Bloodaxe Books, 2000)
- Ireland (Ulster) Scotland: Concepts, Contexts, Comparisons (co-editor) (Cló Ollscoil na Banríona, Belfast, 2003)
- Edward Thomas: The Annotated Collected Poems (Bloodaxe Books, 2008)
