= International Society for Neoplatonic Studies =

Learned society established in 1973

The International Society for Neoplatonic Studies (ISNS) is a learned society established in 1973 to support teaching and research relating to Neoplatonism. The International Journal of the Platonic Tradition is published under its auspices by Brill Academic Publishers.

The Society also organizes conferences and similar events.

Among the Officers of the Society are John Dillon and Jean-Marc Narbonne.
