= Joshua Bond =

Irish politician

Member of Parliament for Armagh City
- In office 5 May 1859 – 17 July 1865
- Preceded by: Stearne Miller
- Succeeded by: Stearne Miller
- In office 6 December 1855 – 2 April 1857
- Preceded by: Ross Stephenson Moore
- Succeeded by: Stearne Miller

Personal details
- Born: 1831
- Died: 29 August 1905 (aged 74)
- Party: Conservative

Joshua Walter McGeough Bond (1831 – 29 August 1905) was an Irish Conservative Party politician.

Bond was elected Conservative Member of Parliament (MP) for Armagh City at a by-election in 1855—caused by the death of Ross Stephenson Moore—but was then defeated by Stearne Miller at the next election. Although he regained the seat in 1859, he only held it for one term before retiring from the race in 1865.

Parliament of the United Kingdom
Preceded by Ross Stephenson Moore	Member of Parliament for Armagh City; 1855–1857	Succeeded by Stearne Miller
Preceded by Stearne Miller	Member of Parliament for Armagh City; 1859–1865	Succeeded by Stearne Miller
