= Ross Stephenson Moore =

Irish politician

Member of Parliament for Armagh City
- In office 9 July 1852 – 5 October 1855
- Preceded by: John Rawdon
- Succeeded by: Joshua Bond

Personal details
- Born: 1809
- Died: 5 October 1855 (aged 46)
- Party: Conservative

Ross Stephenson Moore (1809 – 5 October 1855) was an Irish Conservative Party politician.

Moore was elected Conservative Member of Parliament (MP) for Armagh City at the 1852 general election but died before sitting for a full term in 1855.

Parliament of the United Kingdom
Preceded by John Rawdon	Member of Parliament for Armagh City; 1852–1855	Succeeded by Joshua Bond
