= Erasmus Smith's Professor of Modern History =

Erasmus Smith's Professor of Modern History is a chair in history at Trinity College Dublin. It was founded in 1762 and funded by the Erasmus Smith Trust, which was established by Erasmus Smith, who lived 1611–1691. It had been preceded by a Professorship of Oratory and History in 1724, and in 1762 the original professorship continued as a Professorship of Oratory alone.

One of its incumbents was the celebrated J. B. Bury (1861-1927), author of History of the Roman Empire (1893), The Life of St. Patrick and his place in History (1905) and A History of Freedom of Thought (1914). The current occupant of the Erasmus Smith’s chair is Professor Jane Ohlmeyer, a historian of the seventeenth-century Irish nobility.

== List of the professors ==
- William Andrews (1762-1769)
- Michael Kearney (1769-1776)
- Henry Dabzac (1778–1790)
- Digby Marsh (1790-1791)
- George Hall (1791-1799)
- Francis Hodgkinson (1799-1840)
- Joseph Henderson Singer (1840-1860)
- John Lewis Moore (1850-1855)
- vacant (1855-1860)
- James William Barlow (1860-1893)
- J. B. Bury (1893–1902)
- John Henry Wardell
- J. R. H. Weaver (1911–1914)
- Edmund Curtis (1914–1939)
- Theodore William Moody (1939–1977)
- Kenneth Gordon Davies (1977-1986)
- Aidan Clarke (1986-2001)
- Jane H. Ohlmeyer (2003-present)

== See also ==
- List of professorships at the University of Dublin
