= Henry Joseph Dabzac =

Irish academic

Henry Joseph Dabzac (1737 – 12 May 1790) was an Irish academic.

== Life and career ==
Dabzac entered Trinity College Dublin (TCD) (1753), graduated BA (1757), and became a fellow (1760–75) and a senior fellow (1775–90). He was Donegall Lecturer in Mathematics (1764-1769) and gained his BD (1767) and DD (1772). He was Archbishop King's lecturer (1773, 1779), and gained his MA in 1760. He served as Regius Professor of Greek (1775–8) and Erasmus Smith's Professor of Modern History (1778–90) and concurrently was Regius Professor of Laws (1779–82).

In March 1774 he married Catherine Pigou and they had twelve children, of whom four died in infancy.

Dabzac was the librarian at TCD from 1785 until his death.
