= William Bedell Stanford =

Irish classical scholar and senator (1910–1984)

Senator
- In office 21 April 1948 – 5 November 1969
- Constituency: Dublin University

Personal details
- Born: 16 January 1910 Belfast, Ireland
- Died: 30 December 1984 (aged 74) Dublin, Ireland
- Party: Independent
- Spouse: Dorothy Wright (m. 1935)
- Children: 4
- Education: Trinity College Dublin

William Bedell Stanford (16 January 1910 – 30 December 1984) was an Irish classical scholar and senator. He was Regius Professor of Greek at Trinity College Dublin from 1940 to 1980, and served as chancellor of the University of Dublin from 1982 to 1984.

== Early life ==
He was born in Belfast, the son of a Dublin-born Church of Ireland clergyman the Rev. Bedell Stanford, rector of Dundrum, County Down, and Susan Stanford (née Jackson). He was educated at Bishop Foy's School in Waterford, where a special teacher had to be recruited to coach him in Greek.

His grandfather's cousin was the composer Charles Villiers Stanford.

== Academic career ==
He subsequently won a sizarship to Trinity College Dublin. He was elected a Scholar in his first year at Trinity, having become an undergraduate in October 1928. He also served as auditor of the College Classical Society. He was editor of TCD: A College Miscellany in Hilary term of 1931. He became a Fellow in 1934 and was one of the last Fellows to be elected by examination. Stanford was one of seven candidates nominated for the Provostship of the Trinity College on 11 March 1952 but was eliminated along with two other candidates in the first round of the election. He was considered, at the age of 42, to be too junior. The successful candidate on that occasion was the mathematician, Albert Joseph McConnell, who remained in office for 22 years.

Stanford established himself as a Greek scholar in his twenties with the publication of two books which approached Greek literature as a subject for literary criticism, Greek Metaphor and Ambiguity in Greek Literature. He is perhaps best remembered for his commentaries aimed at students on Homer's Odyssey, Aristophanes' Frogs, and Sophocles' Ajax.

In 1965, Stanford gave the Sather Lectures at the University of California, Berkeley, on the topic of the pronunciation of Ancient Greek. The lectures were revised into a book published in 1967.

Stanford had a particular interest in the classical tradition, in Ireland and elsewhere, and published a number of articles on this topic in the Trinity journal Hermathena, as well as a wide-ranging book entitled Ireland and the Classical Tradition.

A long-time member of the Royal Irish Academy, Stanford was appointed chairman of the Dublin Institute for Advanced Studies by the President of Ireland, Éamon de Valera.

Stanford's poetry appears in several anthologies and his posthumously published memoirs.

After Stanford's death, a series of lectures in his honour was established at Trinity College, Dublin. The first lecturer in the series was Duncan F. Kennedy, a former student of Stanford's.

== Seanad career ==
He also represented the Dublin University constituency in Seanad Éireann from 1948 to 1969. During the 1950s, however, he came out publicly against the Fethard-on-Sea boycott, and he also demanded an inquiry into the assault on Jehovah's Witnesses in Clare. In both cases, Éamon de Valera proved sympathetic personally but declined to take any public action.

== Bibliography ==
- Greek Metaphor: Studies in Theory and Practice, Oxford 1936
- Ambiguity in Greek Literature, Oxford 1939
- Aeschylus in His Style: A Study in Language and Personality, Dublin 1942
- The Odyssey of Homer, Vol.1 (Books 1–12), London 1947
- The Odyssey of Homer, Vol.2 (Books 13–24), London 1948
- The Ulysses Theme: A Study in the Adaptability of a Traditional Hero, Oxford 1955; second ed. Putnam, Conn. 1993
- The Frogs, by Aristophanes, London 1958
- Ajax, by Sophocles, London 1963
- The Sound of Greek: Studies in the Greek Theory and Practice of Euphony, Berkeley 1967
- Mahaffy: A Biography of an Anglo-Irishman (with R. B. McDowell), London 1971
- The Quest for Ulysses (with John Victor Luce), London 1974
- Ireland and the Classical Tradition, Dublin 1976
- Enemies of Poetry, London 1980
- Greek tragedy and the emotions: an introductory study, London 1983
- The Travels of Lord Charlemont in Greece & Turkey, 1749 (with Eustathios J Finopoulos), London 1984
- Stanford: Regius Professor of Greek, 1940–80, Trinity College, Dublin: Memoirs, Dublin 2002

Academic offices
Preceded by W. A. Goligher	Regius Professor of Greek at Trinity College Dublin; 1940–1980	Succeeded by John M. Dillon
Preceded by Frederick Boland	Chancellor of the University of Dublin; 1982–1984	Succeeded by Francis O'Reilly
