= Stephen B. Kelleher =

Irish mathematician (1875–1917)

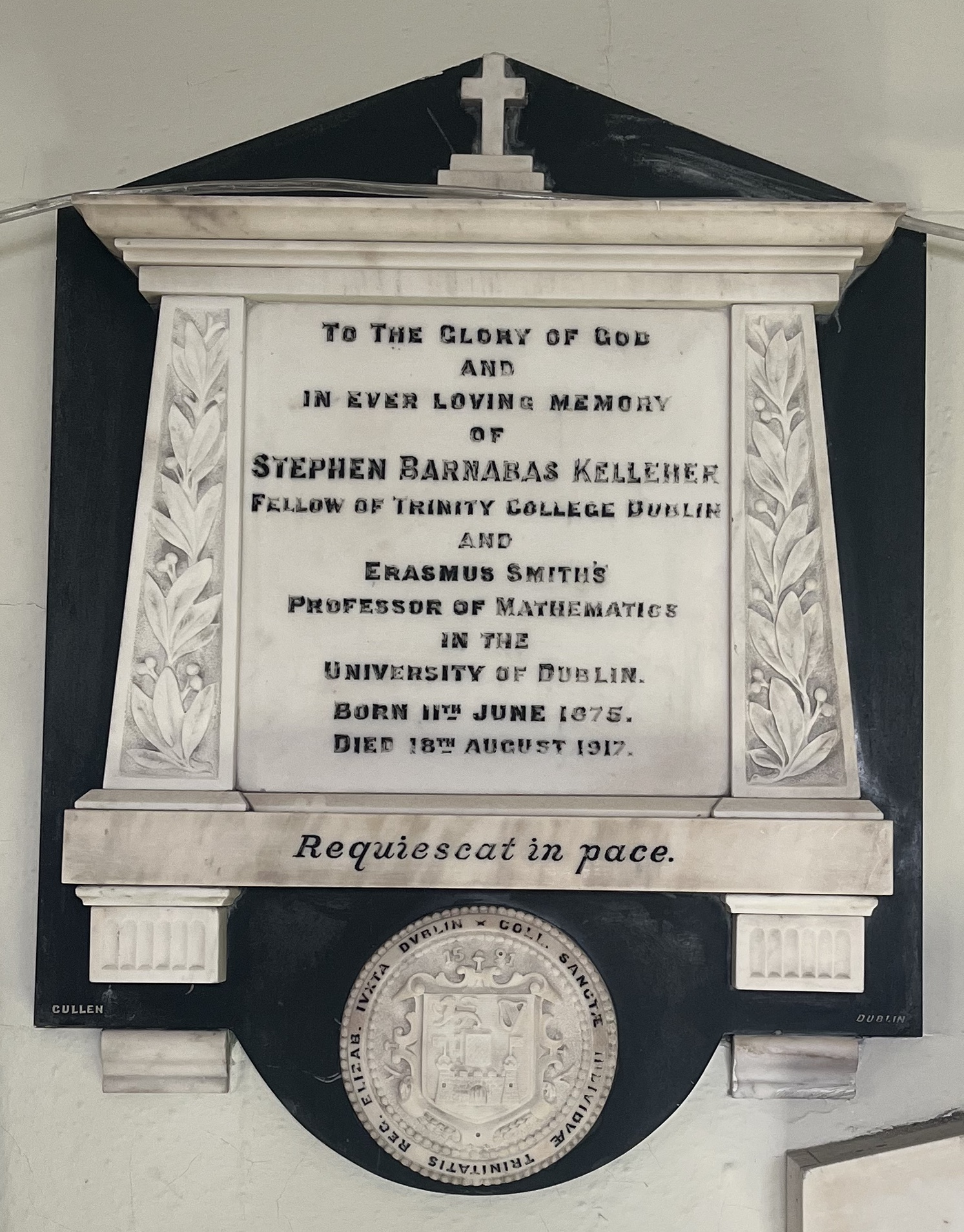
Stephen B Kelleher Memorial in St Andrew's Church, Westland Row, Dublin

Stephen Barnabus Kelleher (1875–1917) was an Irish mathematician who served as Erasmus Smith's Professor of Mathematics at Trinity College Dublin (TCD) from 1914 to 1917.

== Early life and career ==
Kelleher was born on 11 June 1875 at 25 King Street, in Cork City, to William Kelleher (an accountant) and Helena Walsh. He attended Christian Brothers schools in the city and then studied mathematics at Queen's College Cork (BA 1895, MA 1896). Moving to Dublin, he took another mathematics degree at TCD (BA 1902, large gold medal), where he became a Scholar in 1900 and became a Fellow in 1904 (and MA 1905). In 1910 he was appointed assistant to the Professor of Natural Philosophy there, and in 1914, he was appointed Erasmus Smith's Professor of Mathematics. He died on 18 August 1917, due to sarcomatosis asthenia.

== Family ==
On 22 December 1910, he married Isabel Marion Johnston (of a Derry family) in London. She had made history in January 1904 by becoming the first woman to register at TCD. The couple had two daughters.

== Controversy ==
Kelleher was on the Royal Commission to draw up a plan for the establishment of a university in Ireland that would be satisfactory to Catholics. The resulting Fry Commission Report (1907) had five principal findings, the first two being: 1. That TCD is satisfactory for Protestants but not for Catholics. 2. A new college in Dublin acceptable to Catholics is recommended; one commissioner dissenting.

The lone dissenter was Kelleher, which is ironic as he himself was Catholic. As a TCD man, be believed that it would be "a grave danger to the interests of Irish lay Catholics and a menace to the future peace of the country".
