= Charles Richard Elrington =

Irish cleric and academic

- Born: 1787; Dublin
- Died: 1850 (aged 62–63)
- Education: Trinity College Dublin
- Occupations: Anglican priest Academic

Charles Richard Elrington (1787–1850) was a Church of Ireland cleric and academic, regius professor of divinity in the Trinity College Dublin.

== Life ==
The elder son of Thomas Elrington, Bishop of Ferns and Leighlin and Charlotte Preston, he was born in Dublin on 25 March 1787, and was educated at home by a private tutor. Having entered Trinity College Dublin, 3 November 1800, under the tutorship of the Rev. Dr. Davenport, and having gained all the honours of his class, he was awarded the gold medal in 1806 for his term examinations. In the same year he gained Bishop Law's mathematical premium, and in 1806 the primate's Hebrew prize. He graduated B.A. in 1805, M.A. 1811, B.D. 1816, and D.D. 1820. In 1810 he was elected a fellow of his college, having obtained the Madden premium in the three preceding years.

He was ordained a deacon on 28 October 1810, and on 23 February 1812 was admitted to priest's orders. In December 1814, he married Letitia, daughter of DavidBabington of Rutland Square, Dublin, and niece of the physician and mineralogist William Babington; she died in 1827. They had two sons and three daughters, including Catherine, who married John Thomas Ball, Lord Chancellor of Ireland. In 1819, he was elected Donnellan lecturer in the university, but his lectures were not published. In 1825, he was appointed by the Lord Chancellor of Ireland and other joint patrons to the vicarage of St. Mark's, Dublin, and held that benefice until 1831. On 31 January 1832, he was collated to the rectory and prebend of Edermine in the diocese of Ferns, which three months later he exchanged for the chancellorship.

In 1829, he resigned his fellowship, and was elected regius professor of divinity. In 1840, he resigned the chancellorship of Ferns on his collation by the lord primate, on 14 December, to the rectory of Loughgilly, in the diocese of Armagh; and on 22 September in the following year, at the desire of the same patron, he moved to the rectory of the union of Armagh. He effected improvements in the divinity school, over which he presided for twenty years. He died at Armagh on 18 January 1850, and was buried in St. Mark's churchyard there, where there is a brief Latin inscription to his memory.

Elrington took a very active and prominent part in the formation and management of the Church Education Society, founded to provide funds to support the parochial schools connected with the church, on the withdrawal of the parliamentary grant. Modifications were afterwards introduced into the management of the national schools, which removed, in Elrington's judgement, many of the difficulties which had induced the clergy to stand aloof from the system. In 1847 he retired from his official position in the Church Education Society, and publicly declared that the clergy ought to accept the amended terms offered by the board of national education.

== Works ==
In 1847 Elrington began the publication of a collected edition of the works of Archbishop James Ussher, to which he prefixed a full biography. He did not live to complete it, and the last two volumes were published by William Reeves. His plan, formed with Henry Cotton and James Henthorn Todd, of bringing out an improved edition of James Ware's History of the Irish Bishops, was not carried into effect before his death.

He published sermons and pamphlets on the education question, besides theological contributions to periodicals.

== Notes ==
=== References ===
- This article incorporates text from a publication now in the public domain: Blacker, Beaver Henry (1889). "Elrington, Charles Richard". In Stephen, Leslie (ed.). Dictionary of National Biography. Vol. 17. London: Smith, Elder & Co. pp. 331, 332. Endnotes:
  - Dublin University Calendars
  - Todd's Catalogue of Dublin Graduates
  - Cotton's Fasti Ecclesiæ Hibernicæ, ii.357, 371, v. 180
  - Gentlemen's Magazine (1850), new ser. xxxiii. pt. i. 678
  - Irish Ecclesiastical Journal (l February 1850), vi. 17
  - Stephens's "Introduction" to volume iii. of the Book of Common Prayer for Ireland, printed for the Ecclesiastical History Society, 1850.
