= John Vance (MP) =

British politician

John Vance (10 December 1808 – 21 September 1875) was a Conservative MP for Dublin City from 1852 until his defeat in 1865. He was later elected unopposed for Armagh City and represented the constituency from 30 June 1867 until his death.

Vance was born in Dublin to a family with strong connections to County Tyrone; they are believed to have emigrated from Scotland in the eighteenth century. He was the eldest son of Andrew Vance of Rutland Square and Mary Falls, daughter of James Falls of Aughnacloy, County Tyrone. His numerous siblings included Andrew Vance (died 1862), Law Adviser to the Lord Lieutenant of Ireland, and Thomas Vance (died 1889), a well-to-do merchant, of Blackrock House, Blackrock, Dublin. Richard Dowse, the eminent politician and judge, was a cousin through his grandmother Mary Vance.

He was married and had two daughters: Florence, who never married, and Adelaide-Sidney (died 1907), who married Sir Richard Francis Keane, 4th Baronet, and was the mother of the politician Sir John Keane, 5th Baronet.

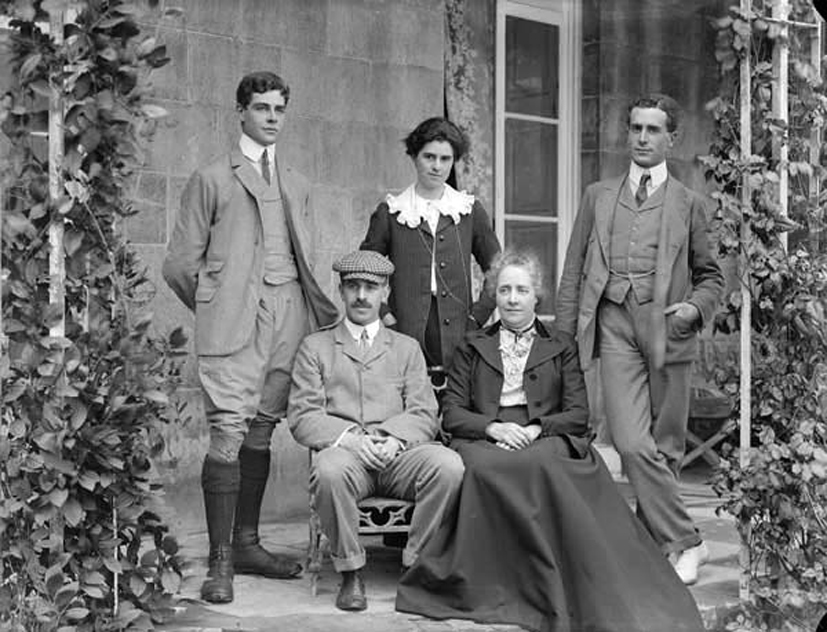
Sir John Keane, Vance's grandson, with his family

In the 1847 General Election, Vance was unsuccessful in his attempts to be elected for Canterbury. In 1853, the Canterbury Bribery Commission found his agent guilty of bribery.

== Dublin City Elections ==
=== General Election, 1852 (2 seats) ===
The Times reports Vance's address to the electors as all that the Protestant Party could reasonably or unreasonably desire. The Dublin Orange Lodges pronounce for him. He is against the Maynooth Grant.

1. Edward Grogan (Conservative) 4,531 (37.82%)
2. John Vance 4,429 (36.97%)
3. John Reynolds (Liberal - Independent Opposition) 3,019 (25.20%)

=== General Election, 1857 (2 seats) ===
1. Edward Grogan 3,767 (26.47%)
2. John Vance 3,711 (26.08%)
3. Francis William Brady (Liberal) 3,405 (23.93%)
4. John Reynolds (Liberal) 3,348 (23.53%)

=== General Election, 1859 (2 seats) ===
1. Sir Edward Grogan, Bt 4,251 (26.03%)
2. John Vance 4,224 (25.86%)
3. Francis William Brady 3,976 (24.34%)
4. Alexander McCarthy (Liberal) 3,881 (23.76%)

=== General Election, 1865 (2 seats) ===
1. Sir Benjamin Lee Guinness, Bt (Conservative) 4,739 (35.19%)
2. Jonathan Pim (Liberal) 4,653 (34.56%)
3. John Vance 4,073 (30.25%)

On Vance's defeat, the Cork Examiner stated that Pim typified Dublin's reformation from "unlightened and unadorned Orangeism".

== "Rome Rule" ==
Vance coined the phrase "Home Rule is Rome Rule", meaning that the efforts to secure Irish Home Rule would result in a state dominated by the Roman Catholic Church. In a debate on an Irish Bill on 12 July 1871 he said: "He was speaking to the question raised by the hon. Member for Westmeath, and his own opinion was that "home rule" in Ireland would prove to be "Rome rule"." The slogan was popularized by John Bright to oppose the first Irish Home Rule Bill 1886 a decade after Vance's death.

Parliament of the United Kingdom
Preceded by Sir Edward Grogan; John Reynolds	Member of Parliament for Dublin; 1852–1865; With: Sir Edward Grogan	Succeeded by Jonathan Pim; Benjamin Guinness
Preceded by Stearne Miller	Member of Parliament for Armagh City; 1867–1875	Succeeded by George Beresford
