= Thomas Elrington (bishop) =

Irish academic and bishop

The Reverend Thomas Elrington
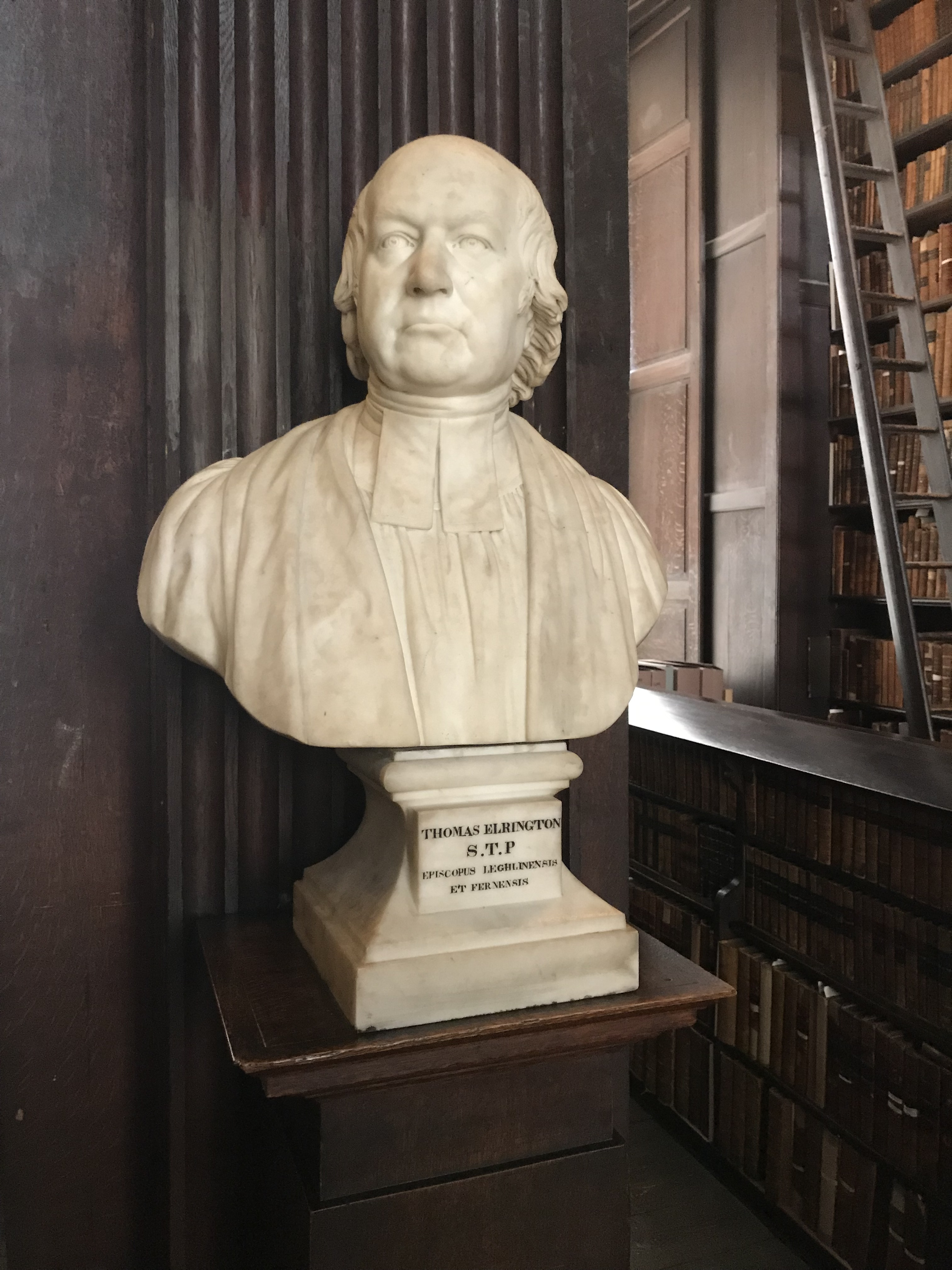
- Bust of Provost Thomas Elrington in the Library of Trinity College Dublin.

25th Provost of Trinity College Dublin
- In office 25 November 1811 – 30 July 1820
- Preceded by: George Hall
- Succeeded by: Samuel Kyle

Personal details
- Born: 18 December 1760 Dublin, Ireland
- Died: 12 July 1835 (aged 74) Liverpool, England
- Resting place: Trinity College Chapel
- Spouse: Charlotte Preston (m. 1781)
- Children: 7
- Education: Trinity College, Dublin (B.A., 1780; M.A., 1785; B.D., 1795; D.D., 1795)

Thomas Elrington (18 December 1760 – 12 July 1835) was an Irish academic and bishop who served as the 25th Provost of Trinity College Dublin from 1811 to 1820. He was Donegall Lecturer in Mathematics from 1790 to 1795 at Trinity College Dublin. While at Trinity College, he also served as Erasmus Smith's Professor of Mathematics from 1795 to 1799 and Erasmus Smith's Professor of Natural and Experimental Philosophy from 1799 to 1807.

He also held several ecclesiastical seals, such as Bishop of Ferns and Leighlin, then Bishop of Limerick, Ardfert and Aghadoe (1820-1822), and finally Bishop of Ferns and Leighlin until his death in 1835.

== Early life ==
The only child of Richard and Catherine Elrington of Dublin, he was born near that city on 18 December 1760. He entered Trinity College Dublin, on 1 May 1775 as a pensioner, under the tutorship of the Rev. Dr. Drought, and was elected a Scholar in 1778. He graduated B.A. in 1780, M.A. in 1785, and B.D. and D.D. in 1795.

== Academic career ==
In 1781, he was elected a fellow of Trinity College. He was Donegall Lecturer of Mathematics (1790-1795), and in 1794, he was the first to hold the office of Donnellan Divinity Lecturer. In 1795, he was appointed Archbishop King's Lecturer in Divinity, succeeded to a senior fellowship, and also became the third Erasmus Smith's Professor of Mathematics (1795–1799). In 1799, he exchanged the Erasmus Smith's professorship of mathematics for the Erasmus Smith's Professor of Natural and Experimental Philosophy.

In 1789, he published the mathematical treatise Euclidis Elementorum Sex Libri Priores, Cum Notis (Dublin University Press), whose 10th edition appeared in 1833.

On resigning his fellowship in 1806, Elrinton was presented by his college to the rectory of Ardtrea, in the diocese of Armagh, which he held until December 1811. He resigned, having been appointed to the provostship of Trinity College. During his tenure in this office, he was the acting manager of almost every public board and a supporter of charitable institutions.

Elrington was advanced on 25 September 1820 to the diocese of Limerick, and on 21 December 1822, he was translated to Leighlin and Ferns. While on his way to attend Parliament duties in London, he died of paralysis at Liverpool on 12 July 1835. He was buried under the chapel of Trinity College Dublin, where a monument with a Latin inscription was in his memory. Another memorial was erected by his clergy in the cathedral church of Ferns. Elrington was an active member of the Royal Irish Academy and other literary and scientific societies. The Elrington theological essay prize was instituted in Trinity College in 1837.

A portrait of the bishop was painted in 1820 for his brother, Major Elrington, by Thomas Foster; engraved by William Ward, it was published in 1836 by Graves & Co. There was a marble bust in the Library of Trinity College Dublin.

Elrington was knowledgeable, but contemporaries found him inflexible, rigid, and narrow-minded. Students, while praising him for his learning, found him personally obnoxious.

== Works ==
His works are:

- 'Refutation of the Arguments in Dr Butler's Letter to Lord Kenmare,' 1787.
- 'Reply to the Third Section of Mr. O'Leary's Defence,' 1787.
- 'Thoughts on the Principles of Civil Government, and their Foundation in the Law of Nature, by S.N.' [Thomas Elrington], 1793.
- 'Enquiry into the Consistency of Dr. Troy's Pastoral Instruction,' 1793.
- 'Sermons on Miracles, preached at the Donnellan Lecture in Trinity College, Dublin, in 1795; with an Act Sermon for the degree of D.D.,' 1796.
- 'Sermon on the Death of Matthew Young, D.D., Bishop of Clonfert; with some Anecdotes of his Life' (three editions), 1800.
- 'The Vindication of Dr. Troy Refuted,' 1804.
- 'The Clergy of the Church of England truly Ordained, in reply to Ward's Controversy of Ordination; with an Appendix,' 1808.
- 'Letters on Tythes, first published in the "Dublin Journal"' (two editions), 1808.
- 'Reflections on the Appointment of Dr. Milner as the Political Agent of the Roman Catholic Clergy of Ireland,' 1809.
- 'Remarks occasioned by the Supplement and Postscript to the second edition of Dr. Milner's Tour in Ireland,' 1809.
- 'Letter to the Right Hon. W. W. Pole on the Proposal for a Commutation of Tythes in Ireland,' 1810.
- 'The Validity of English Ordination Established, in answer to the Rev. P. Gandolphy's Sermon on John x. 1,' 1818.
- 'Inquiry whether the Disturbances in Ireland have originated in Tythes,' 1822; second edition, with an Appendix, 1823.
- 'Observations on J.K.L.'s [Bishop Doyle's] Letter to the Marquess Wellesley; on Tracts and Topics by E. Barton; and the Letter to Mr. Abercrombie,' 1824.
- 'Review of the Correspondence between the Earl of Mountcashell and the Bishop of Ferns, with the Letters,' 1830.
- 'Reply to John Search's [Archbishop Whateley's] Considerations on the Law of Libel as relating to Publications on the subject of Religion,' 1834.

Elrington also published sermons and charges, and edited, for the use of Trinity College, 'Euclid's Elements, the first Six Books,' 1788 (ten or twelve times reprinted); 'Locke on Government, with Notes,' 1798; and 'Juvenalis et Persius, edito expurgata,' 1808.

== Family ==
About 1786 he married Charlotte, daughter of the Rev. Plunket Preston, rector of Duntryleague, County Limerick, and by her had issue Charles Richard Elrington, another son Henry, and several daughters, including Caroline (died 1868), who married, in 1827, John Whitley Stokes (1801-1883), Archdeacon of Armagh, and had a son Thomas Gabriel Stokes. John Whitley Stokes was the elder brother of the noted physicist Sir George Stokes, 1st Baronet.

== Notes ==
Attribution

This article incorporates text from a publication now in the public domain: "Elrington, Thomas (1760-1835)". Dictionary of National Biography. London: Smith, Elder & Co. 1885–1900.

Academic offices
Preceded by George Hall	Provost of Trinity College Dublin; 1811–1820	Succeeded by Samuel Kyle
Church of Ireland titles
Preceded by Charles Mongan Warburton	Bishop of Limerick, Ardfert and Aghadoe; 1820–1822	Succeeded by John Jebb
Preceded by Robert Ponsonby Tottenham Loftus	Bishop of Ferns and Leighlin; 1822–1835	Succeeded by See is united to Ossory
