= Stearne Miller =

Stearne Ball Miller MP

Member of Parliament for Armagh City
- In office 17 July 1865 – 30 January 1867
- Preceded by: Joshua Bond
- Succeeded by: John Vance
- In office 2 April 1857 – 5 May 1859
- Preceded by: Joshua Bond
- Succeeded by: Joshua Bond

Personal details
- Born: 1813
- Died: 2 May 1897 (aged 83)
- Party: Conservative
- Spouse: Sarah Rutherford
- Parent(s): George Miller, Elizabeth Ball

Stearne Ball Miller QC (1813 – 2 May 1897) was an Irish Conservative Party barrister, judge and politician.

He was born in Armagh, son of the Reverend George Miller, the Anglican priest and noted historian, and Elizabeth Ball, daughter of Robert Ball of County Wicklow. He was called to the Bar in 1835, Queen's Counsel in 1852. He married Sarah Rutherford, daughter of M.B. Rutherford of Dublin. He lived at Rutland Square in Dublin.

Miller was first elected MP for Armagh City in 1857, but was defeated at the next election in 1859. He regained the seat at the 1865 election, but resigned after being appointed the judge in bankruptcy in 1867. He held office as the Irish Bankruptcy judge until his death in 1897.

Parliament of the United Kingdom
Preceded by Joshua Bond	Member of Parliament for Armagh City; 1865 – 1867	Succeeded by John Vance
Preceded by Joshua Bond	Member of Parliament for Armagh City; 1857 – 1859	Succeeded by Joshua Bond
