= Thomas Percy (bishop of Dromore) =

Irish Anglican bishop (1729–1811)

The Right Reverend Thomas Percy
- Bishop of Dromore
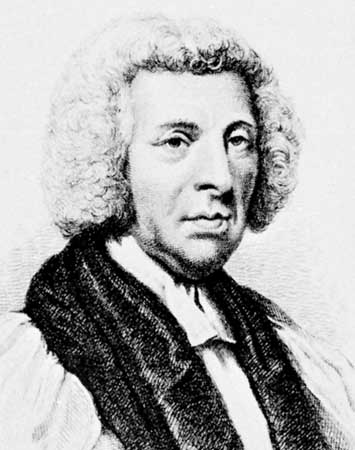
- Thomas Percy, c. 1800
- Diocese: Diocese of Down and Dromore
- In office: 1782–1811
- Predecessor: William Beresford
- Successor: George Hall
- Other post: Dean of Carlisle (1778–1782)

Orders
- Ordination: 1753
- Consecration: 26 May 1782 by Richard Robinson

Personal details
- Born: 13 April 1729 Bridgnorth, Shropshire, England
- Died: 30 September 1811 (aged 82) Dromore, County Down, Ireland
- Buried: Dromore Cathedral
- Denomination: Anglican
- Residence: Dromore, County Down
- Parents: Arthur Lowe Percy and Jane Percy née Nott
- Spouse: Anne Percy née Gutterridge
- Children: Elizabeth Percy, wife of Pierce Meade
- Education: Bridgnorth Grammar School
- Alma mater: Christ Church, Oxford

Thomas Percy (13 April 1729 – 30 September 1811) was Bishop of Dromore, County Down, Ireland. Before being made bishop, he was chaplain to George III of the United Kingdom. Percy's greatest contribution is considered to be his Reliques of Ancient English Poetry (1765), the first of the great ballad collections, which was the one work most responsible for the ballad revival in English poetry that was a significant part of the Romantic movement.

== Life ==
He was born as Thomas Percy in Bridgnorth, Shropshire, the son of Arthur Lowe Percy, a grocer and farmer at Shifnal, who sent Thomas to Christ Church, Oxford in 1746 following an education firstly at Bridgnorth Grammar School followed by Adams' Grammar School in Newport. He graduated in 1750 and proceeded M.A. in 1753. He was ordained deacon in 1751, and preached at several churches in the Bridgnorth area before becoming priest in 1753, when he was appointed to the vicarage of Easton Maudit, Northamptonshire, and three years later was instituted to the rectory of Wilby in the same county, benefices which he retained until 1782. In 1759 he married Anne, daughter of Barton Gutterridge.

Dr Percy's first work, Hau Kiou Choaan, or The Pleasing History, was published in 1761. This is a heavily revised and annotated version of a manuscript translation of the Haoqiu zhuan (好逑傳), and is the first full publication in English of a Chinese novel. The following year, he published a two-volume collection of sinological essays (mostly translations) entitled 'Miscellaneous Pieces Relating to the Chinese.' In 1763, he published Five Pieces of Runic Poetry, translated from the Icelandic. The same year, he also edited the Earl of Surrey's poems with an essay on early blank verse, translated the Song of Solomon, and published a key to the New Testament. His Northern Antiquities (1770) is a translation from the French of Paul Henri Mallet. His edition of the 'Household Book' of the 5th Earl of Northumberland (1770) (The Regulations and Establishment of the Household of Henry Algernon Percy, the Fifth Earl of Northumberland, at his Castles of Wresill and Lekinfield in Yorkshire. Begun anno domini M.DXII) is of the greatest value for the illustrations of domestic life in England at that period.

These works are of little estimation when compared with the Reliques of Ancient English Poetry (1765). This was primarily based on a manuscript discovered at the Shifnal home of Percy's friend Humphrey Pitt. It was on the floor, and Pitt's maid had been using the leaves to light fires. Once rescued Percy used 45 of the ballads in the folio for his book of 180, adding others from sources – broadside ballads collected by diarist Samuel Pepys and Collection of Old Ballads published in 1723, possibly by Ambrose Philips. Percy was encouraged to publish by his friends Samuel Johnson and the poet William Shenstone, who also found and contributed ballads. In the 1760s, he also obtained a manuscript of ballads (the Percy Folio) from a source in Northumberland. He had in mind the idea of writing a history of the Percy family of the peerage (the Dukes of Northumberland), and he had sought materials of local interest. He had sought out old tales from near Alnwick, the ancestral home of the Northumberland Percy family, and he had come across many ballad tales.

In 1763, Percy, aiming for the market that Ossian had opened for "ancient poetry" (see James MacPherson), published Five Pieces of Runic Poetry from Icelandic, which he translated and "improved."

Percy was a friend of Samuel Johnson, Joseph and Thomas Warton, and James Boswell. In 1764, Dr Johnson and others encouraged Percy to preserve the poetry he was finding at home. Percy therefore took the ballad material he had from his folio and began searching for more ballads, in particular. He wanted to collect material from the border areas, near Scotland. In 1765, he published the Reliques to great success.

Appointed a chaplain to the king in 1769, Percy was formally admitted to Emmanuel College, Cambridge that year, and received a doctorate of divinity from Cambridge in 1770.

Still not having secured an adequate living, Thomas Percy continued with his project of commemorating the Alnwick area, and so he composed his own ballad poem on Warkworth Castle, then a ruin, which the Dukes of Northumberland, then the 1st Duke of Northumberland, Hugh Percy, controlled and which the Duchess of Northumberland, Elizabeth Seymour Percy favored for its sublime views. Combining the vogue for the "Churchyard Poets" and the ballad vogue that he himself had set in motion, Thomas Percy wrote The Hermit of Warkworth in 1771. Samuel Johnson famously composed three ex tempore parodies of this verse in the 1780s. When an admirer too often told Johnson of the beautiful "simplicity" of the ballad verse form, Johnson pointed out that the line between simplicity and simple mindedness is narrow: just remove the sense. He then demonstrated:

The tender infant meek and mild
Fell down upon a stone;
The nurse took up the squealing child
But yet the child squeal'd on.

Thomas Percy was angered by the parody, but Hester Thrale says that he soon came to his senses and realized that Johnson was satirizing the form, and not the poem.

Soon after, he said,

I put my hat upon my head
And went into the Strand.
There I met another man
Whose hat was in his hand.

This extemporized parody was written down by Boswell and others. It may have been aimed less at Percy than at the ballads that were then appearing nearly daily on every subject.

Percy carried out most of the literary work for which he is now remembered at Easton Maudit. When he became famous, he was made domestic chaplain to the 1st Duke of Northumberland, Hugh Percy and Elizabeth Seymour Percy, Duchess of Northumberland, and was tempted into the belief that he belonged to the illustrious house of Percy. Through his patron's influence he became Dean of Carlisle Cathedral in 1778 and was ordained as Bishop of Dromore in County Down in 1782.

His wife died before him in 1806; the bishop, blind but otherwise in sound health, lived another five years. Both were buried in the transept which Percy had added to Dromore Cathedral.

== Literary work ==
The Reliques of Ancient English Poetry set the stage not only for Robert Burns, but also for Wordsworth and Coleridge's Lyrical Ballads. The book is based on an old manuscript collection of poetry, which Percy claimed to have rescued in Humphrey Pitt's house at Shifnal, Shropshire, "from the hands of the housemaid who was about to light the fire with it." The manuscript was edited in its complete form by JW Hales and FJ Furnivall in 1867–1868. This manuscript provides the core of the work but many other ballads were found and included, some by Percy's friends Johnson, William Shenstone, Thomas Warton, and some from a similar collection made by Samuel Pepys.

Percy "improved" 35 of the 46 ballads he took from the Folio. In the case of The Beggar's daughter of Bednal Green (Bethnal Green), he added the historical character of Simon de Montfort, Earl of Evesham (sic). In this version the ballad became so popular that it was used in two plays, an anonymous novel, operas by Thomas Arne and Geoffrey Bush, and Carl Loewe's ballad "Der Bettlers Tochter von Bednall Green". A fuller account of the history of the ballad can be found in "The Green" by A. J. Robinson and D. H. B. Chesshyre.

== Collections ==
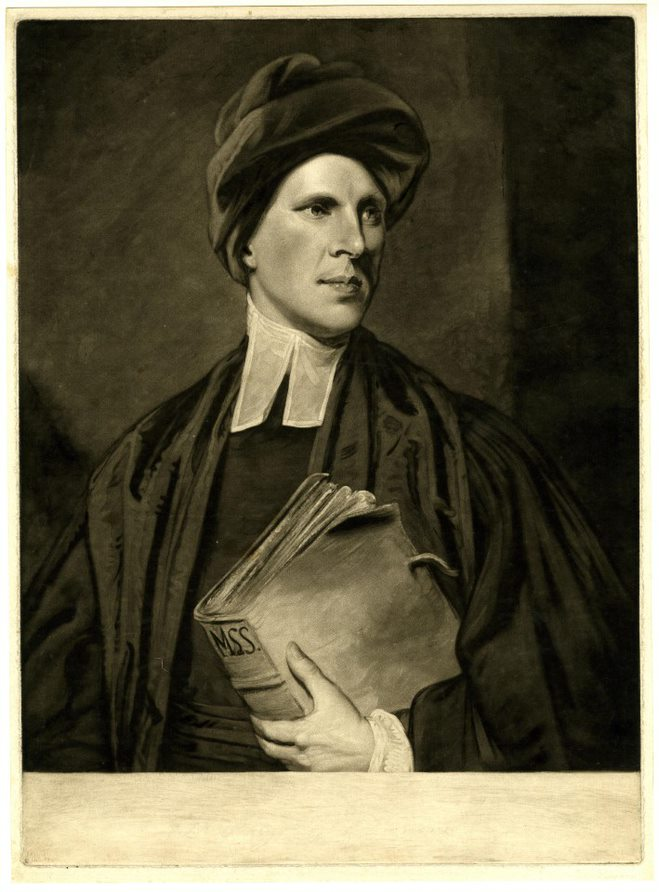
Thomas Percy, 1775

Percy's collection of c.120 volumes were kept by his daughters on his death and were presented to the Bodleian Libraries in 1933 by his great-granddaughter, Miss Constance Meade.

These were mainly literary works of the 17th-19th centuries, including annotated copies of Goldsmith, Johnson and other 18th century authors. Additionally, the collection includes a set of The Rambler (1756) with MS notes by Percy, and a set of The Idler (1761) with MS notes by Percy and Johnson.

Printed ephemera, which had also been passed into the Meade family alongside Percy's books and papers, was given to John Johnson's collection of printed ephemera at the University Press in 1930. This is now part of the John Johnson collection at the Bodleian Library.

The Percy Society (1840–1852) was founded to publish ballads with their accompanying music. Edward Francis Rimbault and William Chappell were among the members.

Church of England titles
Preceded by William Beresford	Bishop of Dromore; 1782 – 1811	Succeeded by George Hall
Preceded by Thomas Wilson	Dean of Carlisle; 1778 – 1782	Succeeded by Jeffery Ekins
