= George Hall (academic) =

Irish bishop and academic (1753–1811)

The Right Reverend George Hall

24th Provost of Trinity College Dublin
- In office 22 January 1806 – 13 November 1811
- Preceded by: John Kearney
- Succeeded by: Thomas Elrington

Personal details
- Born: November 3, 1753 Northumberland, England
- Died: 23 November 1811 (aged 58) Dublin, Ireland
- Resting place: Trinity College Chapel
- Education: Trinity College Dublin (B.A., 1775; M.A., 1778; B.D., 1786; D.D., 1790)

George Hall (3 November 1753 – 23 November 1811) was an English academic who served as the 24th Provost of Trinity College Dublin from 1806 to 1811. He also served as Erasmus Smith's Professor of Mathematics from 1799 to 1800 and the Church of Ireland Bishop of Dromore for a few days before he died in 1811.

== Early life ==
Son of the Rev. Mark Hall, of Northumberland, he was born there, but soon thereafter his family moved to Ireland. His first employment was as an assistant-master in Dr. Darby's school near Dublin. Having entered Trinity College Dublin, on 1 November 1770, under the tutorship of the Rev. Gerald Fitzgerald, he was elected a scholar in 1773; he graduated B.A. 1775, M.A. 1778, B.D. 1786, and D.D. 1790.

== Academic career ==
He was a successful candidate for a fellowship in 1777 at Trinity College, and on 14 May 1790, he was co-opted as a senior fellow. Along with his fellowship, he filled various academic offices, being elected Archbishop King's lecturer in divinity 1790–1, Regius Professor of Greek 1790 and 1795, Erasmus Smith's Professor of Modern History 1791, and Erasmus Smith's Professor of Mathematics 1799.

Hall resigned his fellowship and professorship in 1800, and on 25 February of that year was presented by his college to the rectory of Ardstraw in the diocese of Derry. In 1806, he returned to Trinity College, having been appointed to the provostship by patent dated 22 January, and held that office until his promotion, on 13 November 1811, to the bishopric of Dromore. He was consecrated in the college chapel on the 17th of the same month but died on the 23rd in the Provost's House, from which he had not had time to move. He was buried in the Chapel of Trinity College, where a monument with a Latin inscription to his memory was erected by his niece, Margaret Stack. There was another memorial to him, in the parish church of Ardstraw.

Academic offices
Preceded by John Kearney	Provost of Trinity College Dublin; 1806–1811	Succeeded by Thomas Elrington
Church of Ireland titles
Preceded by Thomas Percy	Bishop of Dromore; October 1811– November 1811	Succeeded by John Powell Leslie
