= John Kearney (bishop) =

Irish academic and bishop

The Right Reverend John Kearney
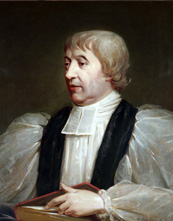
- Portrait by William Cuming, c. 1810.

23rd Provost of Trinity College Dublin
- In office 30 July 1799 – 19 January 1806
- Preceded by: Richard Murray
- Succeeded by: George Hall

Personal details
- Born: 10 August 1744 Dublin, Ireland
- Died: 22 May 1813 (aged 68) Kilkenny, Ireland
- Resting place: Trinity College Chapel
- Education: Trinity College Dublin

John Kearney, D.D. (10 August 1744 – 22 May 1813) was an Irish academic and bishop who served as the 23rd Provost of Trinity College Dublin from 1799 to 1806. He was the Church of Ireland Bishop of Ossory from 1806 to 1813.

== Early life ==
Kearney was born in Dublin in 1744, the son of a barber-surgeon, and the younger brother of Michael Kearney.

Kearney was elected a Scholar of Trinity College Dublin in 1760 and a Fellow in 1764.

== Academic career ==
He held the Chair of Oratory from 1781 until his appointment as Provost in July 1799.

Kearney was nominated Bishop of Ossory on 4 January and appointed by letters patent on 20 January 1806. He was consecrated at Trinity College Chapel on 2 February 1806, by Charles Agar, Archbishop of Dublin, assisted by Charles Lindsay, Bishop of Kildare and Nathaniel Alexander, Bishop of Down and Connor. His replacement as Provost was George Hall. That year, Kearney was elected a Fellow of the Royal Society in May 1806.

Kearney died in office in Kilkenny on 22 May 1813.

Academic offices
Preceded by Richard Murray	Provost of Trinity College Dublin; 1799–1806	Succeeded by George Hall
Church of Ireland titles
Preceded by Hugh Hamilton	Bishop of Ossory; 1806–1813	Succeeded by Robert Fowler
