= Leonard Dobbin (politician) =

Irish Liberal politician

Coat of arms of Leonard Dobbin
Notes Posthumously granted 24 April 1861 by Sir John Bernard Burke, Ulster King of Arms. Crest Out of a mural crown an oak branch acorned Proper the crown charged with a crescent Or. Escutcheon Gules five mullets of six points two one and two Or in the centre chief point a crescent of the last between flanches chequy Argent and Sable. Motto Re E Merito

Leonard Dobbin (29 September 1762 – 19 February 1844) was an Irish Liberal politician who sat in the House of Commons from 1832 to 1837.

He was the eldest son of Leonard Dobbin senior, of Mount Dobbin, Tirnascobe, County Armagh and Mary Oates, daughter of Thomas Oates, and a descendant of Adam Murray, who commanded the Williamite forces at the Siege of Derry. The Dobbins were an old Carrickfergus family, one branch of which settled in Armagh.

Dobbin was a clerk of the peace in Armagh. In the 1832 general election Dobbin was elected as Member of Parliament (MP) for Armagh City. He held the seat until 1837. Dobbin then became High Sheriff of Armagh in 1838.

Dobbin gave to the city an area of parkland beside the Ballinahone River in Armagh. This is commemorated in the song Dobbin's Flowery Vale.

He had no children, and his estates passed to his nephew and namesake Leonard Dobbin. On his retirement from politics, his seat in the House of Commons was successfully contested by another nephew, William Curry (1784-1843), Serjeant-at-law (Ireland), son of his sister Anne, who married William Curry senior of Aughnacloy, County Tyrone.

Parliament of the United Kingdom
Preceded by John William Head Brydges	Member of Parliament for Armagh City; 1832 – 1837	Succeeded by William Curry
