= Milo Sumner =

Anglican priest and academic in Ireland in the second half of the 17th century

Milo Sumner, ( – 21 March 1686) D.D. also known as Miles Symner, Miles Symmes or Myles Symner, was an Anglican priest and academic in Ireland in the second half of the seventeenth century.

Sumner was educated at Trinity College, Dublin, where he was a scholar in 1626. He was a major in the Parliamentary Army in the Civil War. He was appointed Fellow and Professor of Mathematics by the Parliamentary Commissioners in 1652, a position which became the Donegall Lectureship. He became Archdeacon of Clogher in 1661 and then Archdeacon of Kildare from 1668.
