= James Wilson (mathematician) =

Irish mathematician

- Born: 1774; Dublin, Ireland
- Died: 1829 (aged 54–55)
- Scientific career
- Fields: Mathematics
- Institutions: Academics of Trinity College Dublin; Donegall Lecturers of Mathematics at Trinity College Dublin

James Wilson (1774? – 24 April 1829) was an Irish mathematician whose career was spent at Trinity College Dublin (TCD). He was born in Dublin, his father being William, and was brought up there. He studied at TCD, graduating BA (1794), MA (1800) and later BD & DD (1811).

While at TCD he was elected a Fellow (1800), was Donegall Lecturer (1807–1820), and Erasmus Smith's Professor of Mathematics (1822–1825). He spent his final years as Rector of Clonfeacle (County Tyrone) (1825–1829).

== Sources ==
- Burtchaell, G. D., and Sadleir, T. U. (eds), Alumni Dublinensis: A Register of the Students, Graduates, Professors and Provosts of Trinity College in the University of Dublin, 1593–1860 (Dublin, 1935)
- Mathematics at TCD 1592–1992 TCD School of Mathematics: The Eighteenth Century
- The Dublin University Calendar For The Year 1877 TCD School of Mathematics
- Armagh clergy and parishes compiled by James B. Leslie
