= John Finamore =

American philosopher

John Finamore (born 1951) is Roger A. Hornsby Professor of the Classics at The University of Iowa. He is known for his research on Greek and Roman Philosophy, Word Power, Greek, and Latin. Finamore is the editor-in-chief of The International Journal of the Platonic Tradition.

== Books ==
- Iamblichus and the Theory of the Vehicle of the Soul (1985)
- Iamblichus' De Anima: Text, Translation, and Commentary (with J.M. Dillon, 2002)
- Plato Redivivus: History of Platonism (New Orleans, 2005), co-editor (with R. Berchman)
- Metaphysical Patterns in Platonism: Ancient, Medieval, Renaissance, and Modern Times (New Orleans, 2007), co-editor (with R. Berchman)
