= Erasmus Smith's Professor of Mathematics =

Positions at Trinity College Dublin

The Erasmus Smith's Professor of Mathematics at Trinity College Dublin is one of two endowed mathematics positions at Trinity College Dublin (TCD), the other being the Donegall Lectureship at Trinity College Dublin. It was founded in 1762 and funded by the Erasmus Smith Trust, which was established by Erasmus Smith (1611–1691). Since 1851, the position has been funded by Trinity College.

Some of the people listed here also held the Erasmus Smith's Chair of Natural and Experimental Philosophy for a period–that's another of the 4 named professorships honouring Smith's memory. The University Professor of Natural Philosophy is also a position within the School of Mathematics, now focusing on applied mathematics and theoretical physics.

== List of the professors ==
- 1762–1764: John Stokes (1720–1781)
- 1764–1795: Richard Murray (1725?–1799)
- 1795–1799: Thomas Elrington (1760–1835)
- 1799–1800: George Hall (1753–1811)
- 1800–1813: William Magee (1766–1831)
- 1813–1822: Bartholomew Lloyd (1772–1837)
- 1822–1825: James Wilson (1774?–1829)
- 1825–1835: Franc Sadleir (1775–1851)
- 1835–1843: James MacCullagh (1809–1847)
- 1843–1862: Charles Graves (1812–1899)
- 1862–1879: Michael Roberts (1817–1882)
- 1879–1913: William Burnside (1839–1920)
- 1914–1917: Stephen Kelleher (1875–1917)
- 1917–1921: Robert Russell (1858?–1938)
- 1921–1926: (vacant)
- 1926–1943: Charles Rowe (1893–1943)
- 1944–1962: T. S. (Stan) Broderick (1893–1962)
- 1962–1964: Heini Halberstam (1926–2014)
- 1964–1966: Gabriel Dirac (1925–1984)
- 1966–1989: Brian Murdoch (1930–2020)
- 1989–2000: (vacant)
- 2000–2001: Paul Feehan (born 1961)
- 2001–2004: (vacant)
- 2004–2008: Adrian Constantin (born 1970)
- 2008– : (vacant)

== See also ==
- List of professorships at the University of Dublin
