= Nakdimon S. Doniach =

British civil servant and lexicographer

Nakdimon S. Doniach

Nakdimon Shabbethay Doniach OBE (8 May 1907 in London, England – 16 April 1994 in Oxford, England) was a British civil servant, lexicographer and scholar of Judaic and Semitic languages.

== Biography ==
The son of Aaron Selig Dionach, a Russian Zionist who had previously been imprisoned for attending the memorial service for Theodor Herzl, Nakdimon had his early education at Haberdashers' Aske's Boys' School. He began studying Hebrew, Greek and Latin at King's College, London in 1923. After two years he won the Hody Scholarship to continue his education at Wadham College, Oxford, where he eventually took a degree in Hebrew and Arabic, and then worked for a number of years as a private scholar and bookseller.

Doniach joined the RAF in the Second World War and was soon after headhunted to serve at Bletchley Park. After 11 years, in which he reached the rank of Squadron Leader, he moved to the Foreign Office department at GCHQ Cheltenham, where he became Director of the Technical Language Section. During the Cold War he was involved in teaching the Russian language to Foreign Office employees and helped create dictionaries for members of the British intelligence services.

He was awarded the OBE in 1967. He was the editor of the 1972 Oxford English-Arabic Dictionary and the 1982 Concise Oxford English-Arabic Dictionary of Current Usage.

== Bibliography ==
=== Works by Doniach ===
- Concise Oxford English-Arabic Dictionary of Current Usage (1992) ISBN 978-0-8288-8436-5
- The Oxford English-Arabic Dictionary of Current Usage (1972) ISBN 978-0-19-864312-8
- Purim or The Feast of Esther: An Historical Study (1933)

=== Obituaries ===
- Obituary, The Independent, 23 April 1994.
