= Francis Hodgkinson =

British academic

Francis Hodgkinson (died 1840) was Regius Professor of Civil Law (1834) and Erasmus Smith's Professor of Modern History (1799) at Trinity College, Dublin. He was also vice-provost of the college from 1821 to 1832. Hodgkinson did not deliver any lectures on history between the date of his appointment in 1799 and his death in 1840, causing his assistant, George Miller, to develop his own lecture course which was subsequently published in several editions. Nor did Hodgkinson deliver any lectures on law.
