= John M. Dillon =

Irish classicist and philosopher (born 1939)

- Born: John Myles Dillon; 15 September 1939 (age 87); Madison, Wisconsin
- Father: Myles Dillon
- Relatives: John David Digues La Touche (maternal grandfather)

Academic work
- Discipline: Classicist
- Institutions: University of California, Berkeley; Trinity College, Dublin

John Myles Dillon (/ˈdɪlən/; born 15 September 1939) is an Irish classicist and philosopher who was Regius Professor of Greek in Trinity College, Dublin between 1980 and 2006. Prior to that he taught at the University of California, Berkeley. He was elected a corresponding member of the Academy of Athens on 15 June 2010, and in July 2022 a corresponding member of the British Academy. Dillon's area of research lies in the history of Platonism from the Old Academy to the Renaissance, and also Early Christianity.

== Contributions ==
Among Dillon's most famous works are his translations of Iamblichus' On the Mysteries of the Egyptians, a definitive book on Middle Platonists and Neoplatonism, and his editorial work on Stephen McKenna's translation of Plotinus' Enneads. With the latter, he continued the same research as his predecessor A. H. Armstrong in the field of Neoplatonic philosophy.

Dillon is also a member of the International Society for Neoplatonic Studies, and is in addition a member of the Editorial Advisory Council of Dionysius. His first novel, The Scent of Eucalyptus, was published in 2007 by the University Press of the South. and in 2020, a fully revised second edition of the novel was published by 451 Editions, Dublin.

== Bibliography ==
- O'Brien, C. S.; Dillon, J. M., eds. (2022), Platonic Love from Antiquity to the Renaissance, Cambridge University Press, ISBN 9781108525596
- Dillon, J. M.; Urmson, J. O. (2021), Iamblichus: On the General Science of Mathematics, London: Bloomsbury Publishing.
- Dillon, J. M. (2020), The Scent of Eucalyptus (2nd Edition), 451 Editions.
- Dillon, J. M.; Polleichtner, Wolfgang (2009), Iamblichus of Chalcis: The Letters, Leiden, Netherlands: The Society of Biblical Literature.
- Dillon, J. M. (2009), Iamblichi Chalcidensis in Platonis Dialogos Commentariorum Fragmenta, The Prometheus Trust.
- Dillon, J. M. (2007), The Scent of Eucalyptus, University Press of the South.
- Dillon, J. M. (2005) [2004], Salt and Olives: Morality and Custom in Ancient Greece (pbk. ed.), Edinburgh University Press.
- Dillon, J. M.; Gerson, Lloyd (2005) [2004], Neoplatonic Philosophy: Introductory Readings (pbk. ed.), Philadelphia: Hackett.
- Dillon, J. M. (2005) [2003], The Heirs of Plato: A Study of the Old Academy, 347 - 247 B.C. (pbk. ed.), Oxford University Press.
- Dillon, J. M.; Gergel, Tania, eds. (2003), The Greek Sophists (translation and introduction ed.), Harmondsworth: Penguin.
- Iamblichus (2003), Clarke, Emma C.; Dillon, J. M.; Hershbell, Jackson P. (eds.), On the Mysteries (with introduction and notes ed.), Atlanta: SCM Press (co-publ. Brill: Leiden, 2003).
- Iamblichus (2002), Finamore, John F.; Dillon, J. M. (eds.), De Anima (text, translation and commentary ed.), Leiden: Brill.
- Dillon, J. M. (1997), The Great Tradition: Further Studies in the Development of Platonism and Christianity, Aldershot: Ashgate.
- Alcinous (1995), Dillon, J. M. (ed.), The Handbook of Platonism (translation and commentary, pbk. ed.), Oxford University Press.
- Morrow, G. R.; Dillon, J. M., eds. (1992) [1987], Proclus' Commentary on Plato's Parmenides (translation, introduction and commentary, corr. pbk. ed.), Princeton University Press, ISBN 0-691-02089-2.
- Dillon, J. M. (1977), The Middle Platonists, Ithaca: Cornell University Press.

== See also ==
- Numenius of Apamea
- Proclus
- Porphyry

Academic offices
Preceded by William Bedell Stanford	Regius Professor of Greek at Trinity College Dublin; 1980–2006	Succeeded by Brian McGing
