= Gabriel Andrew Dirac =

Hungarian-British mathematician (1925-1984)

- Born: 13 March 1925; Budapest
- Died: 20 July 1984 (aged 59); Arlesheim
- Education: Ph.D.
- Alma mater: St John's College, Cambridge; University of London
- Known for: Graph theory
- Scientific career
- Fields: Mathematics
- Institutions: University of Aarhus, Trinity College Dublin
- Thesis: On the Colouring of Graphs: Combinatorial topology of Linear Complexes (1952)
- Doctoral advisor: Richard Rado

Gabriel Andrew Dirac (13 March 1925 – 20 July 1984) was a Hungarian-British mathematician who mainly worked in graph theory. He served as Erasmus Smith's Professor of Mathematics at Trinity College Dublin from 1964 to 1966. In 1952, he gave a sufficient condition for a graph to contain a Hamiltonian circuit. The previous year, he conjectured that n points in the plane, not all collinear, must span at least $\lfloor n/2\rfloor$ two-point lines, where $\lfloor x\rfloor$ is the largest integer not exceeding $x$. This conjecture was proven for sufficiently large $n$ by Green and Tao in 2012.

== Education ==
Dirac started his studies at St John's College, Cambridge in 1942, but in that same year, the war saw him serving in the aircraft industry. He received his MA in 1949, and moved to the University of London, getting his Ph.D. "On the Colouring of Graphs: Combinatorial topology of Linear Complexes" there under Richard Rado.

== Career ==
Dirac's main academic positions were at the King's College London (1948-1954), University of Toronto (1952-1953), University of Vienna (1954-1958), University of Hamburg (1958-1963), Trinity College Dublin (Erasmus Smith's Professor of Mathematics, 1964-1966), University of Wales at Swansea (1967-1970), and Aarhus University (1970-1984).

== Family ==
He was born Balázs Gábor in Budapest, to Richárd Balázs, a military officer and businessman, and Margit "Manci" Wigner (sister of Eugene Wigner). When his mother married Paul Dirac in 1937, he and his sister resettled in England and were formally adopted, changing their family name to Dirac. He married Rosemari Paulsen and they had four children together.

== See also ==
- Dirac's theorem on Hamiltonian cycles
- Dirac's theorem on chordal graphs
- Dirac's theorem on cycles in k-connected graphs
