= William Curry (MP) =

Irish politician

William Curry, or Corry (1784–1843) was an Irish politician, barrister and law officer. He sat in the House of Commons of the United Kingdom and was Serjeant-at-law (Ireland).

He was born in Aughnacloy, County Tyrone, only son of William Curry senior and Anne Dobbin, daughter of Leonard Dobbin senior and sister of Leonard Dobbin, for many years MP for Armagh City. He was called to the Bar in 1806. In 1837, on his uncle Leonard's retirement from the Commons, he successfully contested Leonard's seat, Armagh City. The following year he became Third Serjeant. He vacated his seat in the Commons and his office of Serjeant-at-law in 1840, on his appointment as a Master in the Court of Chancery (Ireland).

He died in September 1843 at his nephew's house in Delgany, County Wicklow. He was married to a Miss Bruce but had no children. The obituary in the Gentleman's Magazine praised him as a man who was held in high esteem by the Bar and the public generally, both for his public and his private qualities.

== Sources ==
- Burke, Bernard. Landed Gentry of Ireland, Vol. 1 London Harrisons 1862
- Hart, A.R. A History of the King's Serjeants-at-law in Ireland, Dublin Four Courts Press 2000
- Gentleman's Magazine, Vol. 113 (1843)
