= Brian H. Murdoch =

Irish mathematician (1930–2020)

Brian Hughes Murdoch (3 April 1930 – 9 December 2020) was an Irish mathematician who served for 23 years as Erasmus Smith's Professor of Mathematics at Trinity College Dublin (TCD). He was an analyst with expertise in potential functions and random walks.

== Career ==
Born in Worcestershire in England in 1930, Brian Hughes Murdoch grew up in Dublin. He attended Trinity College Dublin, where he won a scholarship in mathematics in 1948. He obtained his BA in mathematics in 1951. In 1954, he got his PhD at Princeton under William Feller, for a thesis on “Preharmonic Functions”. After a couple of years teaching at Hull University in Kingston upon Hull and Queen's University Belfast, he returned to TCD, where he taught for another 35 years. He was elected Fellow of TCD in 1965, and the following year he was appointed Erasmus Smith's Professor of Mathematics at TCD, a position he held until he retired in 1989. In 1988 he became a Senior Fellow.

A Quaker, he was a second cousin of the author Iris Murdoch.

He died on 9 December 2020.

== Selected papers ==
- Murdoch, B. H. Simple tests for recurrence or transience of infinite sets in random walks on groups. Illinois J. Math. 12 (1968), 439–450.
- Murdoch, B. H. Wiener's tests for atomic Markov chains. Illinois J. Math. 12 (1968), 35–56.
- Murdoch, B. H. μ-distributed sequences. Proc. Roy. Irish Acad. Sect. A 64 (1966), 143–161.
- Murdoch, B. H. Rates of growth of preharmonic functions. J. London Math. Soc. 40 (1965), 605–618.
- Murdoch, B. H. Some theorems on preharmonic functions. J. London Math. Soc. 40 (1965), 407–417.
- Murdoch, B. H. A note on well-distributed sequences. Canadian J. Math. 17 (1965), 808–810.
- Murdoch, B. H. A theorem on harmonic functions. J. London Math. Soc. 39 (1964), 581–588.
- Murdoch, Brian Hughes PREHARMONIC FUNCTIONS. Thesis (Ph.D.)–Princeton University (1954).
- Allen, A. C.; Murdoch, B. H. A note on preharmonic functions. Proc. Amer. Math. Soc. 4 (1953), 842–852.
