= Michael Kearney (priest) =

18th/19th-century Irish scholar and priest

The Ven. Michael Kearney, D.D. (1734, Dublin – 1814, Dublin) was an Irish priest and academic.

A graduate of Trinity College Dublin, he was the Erasmus Smith's Professor of Modern History there from 1769 to 1776 and Regius Professor of Law from 1776 to 1778. He was the incumbent at Tullyaughnish from 1778; and then Archdeacon of Raphoe from his collation on 28 February 1798 until his death on 11 January 1814.

His younger brother was a Fellow of the Royal Society; Provost of Trinity College Dublin from 1799 to 1806; and Bishop of Ossory from 1806 to 1813.
