= Richard Murray (mathematician) =

Irish mathematician and academic

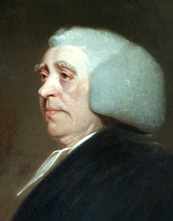
- Provost Richard Murray by William Cuming.

22nd Provost of Trinity College Dublin
- In office 30 July 1795 – 2 March 1799
- Preceded by: John Hely-Hutchinson
- Succeeded by: John Kearney

Personal details
- Born: 15 September 1725 County Down, Ireland
- Died: 2 March 1799 (aged 73) Dublin, Ireland
- Education: Trinity College Dublin (B.A., 1747; M.A., 1750; B.D., 1759; D.D., 1762)

Richard Murray (15 September 1725 – 2 March 1799) was an Irish mathematician and academic who served as the 22nd Provost of Trinity College Dublin from 1795 to 1799. His whole career was Trinity College Dublin, having also served as Erasmus Smith's Professor of Mathematics from 1764 to 1795.

== Early life and education ==
Richard Murray was born in County Down in 1725, to William Murray (merchant). He matriculated at Trinity College Dublin on 30 May 1743, aged 16, and was a Scholar there in 1745. He was awarded B.A. (1747), M.A. and Fellow (1750), B.D. (1759), and D.D. (1762).

== Academic career ==
He was Donegall Lecturer in Mathematics (1762–1764), and then became the second Erasmus Smith's Professor of Mathematics (1764–1795). He was also a Librarian, was appointed Vice-Provost in 1782, and served as Provost from 1795 until his death.

He is perhaps best remembered for his book Artis logicæ compendium (S. Hooper, 1773), "In usum juventutis collegii Dubliniensis", which was translated in 1852 by John Walker as Murray's Compendium of Logic.

Academic offices
Preceded by John Hely-Hutchinson	Provost of Trinity College Dublin; 1795–1799	Succeeded by John Kearney
