= Charles Henry Rowe =

Irish mathematician (1893–1943)

Charles Henry Rowe (9 February 1893, Cork – 4 December 1943) was an Irish mathematician, specializing in geometry. He was Erasmus Smith's Professor of Mathematics at Trinity College Dublin (1926–1943).

== Career ==
Rowe received his bachelor's degree from University College Cork in 1914 and his M.A. in Mathematics and Philosophy from Trinity College Dublin in 1917. He was a close friend of the mathematical physicist J. L. Synge. By winning a competitive examination in 1920, Rowe became a Fellow of Trinity College Dublin and retained the fellowship until his death. He spent the academic year 1920–1921 in Paris, where he studied under Hadamard, Lebesgue, and Goursat.

From 1923 to 1926 he was the Donegall Lecturer in Mathematics at TCD and, after a probationary period as an acting professor, was appointed in 1926 to the Erasmus Smith's Professor of Mathematics, retaining the position until his death.

In 1932 he was an Invited Speaker of the ICM, with talk Subspaces associated with certain systems of curves in a Riemannian space, in 1932 in Zurich. The Rowe Prize of Trinity College Dublin was established in 1959 by a bequest from his widow, Olive Marjorie Rowe.

== Selected publications ==
- "A kinematical treatment of some theorems on normal rectilinear congruences." Trans. Amer. Math. Soc. 31 (1929) 919–930. doi:10.1090/S0002-9947-1929-1501522-4
- "On certain doubly infinite systems of curves on a surface." Bull. Amer. Math. Soc. 36 (1930) 695–704. doi:10.1090/S0002-9904-1930-05040-5
- "Some theorems on the generators of a hyperboloid." Mathematische Annalen 103, no. 1 (1930): 516–531. doi:10.1007/BF01455707
- "A Proof of the Asymptotic Series for log Γ(z) and log Γ(z+ a)." Annals of Mathematics (1931): 10–16. doi:10.2307/1968409
- "A characteristic property of systems of paths." In Proceedings of the Royal Irish Academy. Section A: Mathematical and Physical Sciences, vol. 40, pp. 99–106. Royal Irish Academy, 1931. JSTOR 20490688
- "Characteristic properties of certain systems of paths in a Riemannian space." In Proceedings of the Royal Irish Academy. Section A: Mathematical and Physical Sciences, vol. 41, pp. 102–110. Royal Irish Academy, 1932. JSTOR 20490700
- "On certain systems of curves in Riemannian space." Journal de Mathématiques Pures et Appliquées 12 (1933): 283–308.
- "On natural families of curves." Bull. Amer. Math. Soc. 39 (1933) 793–801. doi:10.1090/S0002-9904-1933-05743-9
- with Bertrand Gambier: "Lieu des points dont les rapports des distances à trois droites fixes restent constants: biquadratiques, cubiques gauches et dégénérescences." In Annales scientifiques de l'École Normale Supérieure, vol. 53, pp. 329–386. Elsevier, 1936.
- "Couples de tétraèdres de Moebius inscrits dans une quadrique (ou une biquadrique) et circonscrits à une autre quadrique (ou une développable de classe quatre)." In Annales scientifiques de l'École Normale Supérieure, vol. 58, pp. 261–283. Elsevier, 1941.
