= Robert Fowler (bishop of Ossory) =

Irish Anglican bishop

Robert Fowler was an Anglican bishop in the late eighteenth and early 19th centuries.

Fowler was educated at Westminster and Christ Church, Oxford. He was Dean of St Patrick's Cathedral, Dublin from 1793 to 1794; Rector of Urney and Archdeacon of Dublin from 1794 until 1813; Bishop of Ossory from 1813 to 1835; and then the inaugural Bishop of Ossory, Ferns and Leighlin from 1835 until his death aged 75 on 31 December 1841.

He was the son of Archbishop Robert Fowler of Dublin.
