= R. D. C. Black =

Irish economic historian

Robert Denis Collison Black, FBA, MRIA (11 June 1922 – 7 December 2008), published as R. D. C. Black and known personally as Bob Black, was an Irish economic historian. He was the Professor of Economics at Queen's University Belfast, from 1962 to 1985, and an expert on the history of Irish economic thought and on W. S. Jevons.

== Early life and education ==
The son of a company secretary, Black was born on 11 June 1922 in Dublin. He attended Sandford Park School and then Trinity College Dublin, where he read commerce alongside economics and political science; he studied under George Alexander Duncan and Charles Bastable. After four years of study, Black graduated with a first-class degree in 1941. He then spent two years producing a PhD thesis on the Irish economist Mountifort Longfield, which he submitted in 1943.

== Career and honours ==
Black worked as a medical orderly in the Irish Army Reserve in the early 1940s. He began teaching at Trinity College in 1942 and deputised for Duncan during Duncan's absence in London from 1943 to 1945. He was appointed an assistant lecturer at Queen's University Belfast, in 1945; colleagues there included Duncan Black, Tom Wilson and Bruce Williams. The next year, he was promoted to a full, tenured lectureship. For the 1950–51 year, he was a Rockefeller postdoctoral fellow at Princeton University. Black published on the history, theory and applications of Irish economic thought. He was promoted to a senior lectureship in 1958 and he wrote Economic Thought and the Irish Question, 1817–1870 in 1960. The next year, he was promoted to a readership.

In 1962, Black was appointed as Stanley Dennison's successor to the Chair of Economics (his inaugural lecture was published as Economic Fashions in 1963); he worked with Jack Parkinson (the Professor of Applied Economics) as joint head of the department, continuing alone after Parkinson left in 1968. Black was also the Dean of Social Sciences from 1967 to 1970, though still managed to compile A Catalogue of Pamphlets on Economic Subjects Published Between 1750 and 1900 and Now Housed in Irish Libraries (1969) and edit The Economic Writings of Mountifort Longfield (1970). From 1971 to 1975, he was the Pro-Vice-Chancellor at Queen's. In the meantime, Black had begun work on editing the papers of the economist and economic historian William Stanley Jevons – an enormous project that had begun in the late 1950s. The seven volumes of Papers and Correspondence were published by the Royal Economic Society between 1972 and 1981; Black edited them all, the first with Rosamond Könekamp and the rest alone. Black retired in 1985. He wrote Ideas in Economics (1986) and compiled Economic Theory and Policy in Context: Selected Essays of R. D. C. Black (1995).

Black was elected a fellow of the British Academy in 1974 and, that year, was also elected to the Royal Irish Academy. In 1982 he became an honorary fellow of Trinity College Dublin. He served as president of the Statistical and Social Inquiry Society of Ireland from 1983 to 1986. He was the subject of a Festschrift: Contributions to the History of Economic Thought: Essays in Honour of R. D. C. Black, edited by A. Murphy and R. Predergast (2000). He died on 7 December 2008.
