= Regius Professor of Law =

Regius Professor of Law may refer to:

- Regius Professor of Law (Glasgow)
- Regius Professor of Laws (Dublin)

== See also ==
- Regius Professor of Civil Law (disambiguation)
