= Louden Ryan =

Irish economist and academic (1923–2018)

William James Louden Ryan, MRIA (1923–2018), known as Louden Ryan, was an Irish economist and academic. He was Professor of Industrial Economics (1961–1967), Whately Professor of Political Economy (1967–1979) and Professor of Political Economy (1979–1985) at Trinity College Dublin. Among a number of public positions, he served as chairman of the National Economic and Social Council from 1973 to 1978 and as Governor of the Bank of Ireland from 1985 to 1991. He has been credited with playing a key role in the transformation of Ireland's economy from one based on agriculture and protectionism to one dominated by industry, free trade and services.

== Career ==
=== Early life, education and academia ===
Born in Portadown in Northern Ireland on 19 October 1923, he attended Trinity College Dublin, where he was appointed an assistant lecturer after graduating in 1946. He completed a PhD at Trinity (with a thesis on "The nature and effects of protective policy in Ireland, 1922–1939") but moved to the London School of Economics in 1949, where he was a lecturer in economics until 1953. He then returned to Trinity to lecture in the Department of Economics under George Alexander Duncan, who was then Whately Chair of Political Economy. A proponent of "eclectic Keynesianism", Ryan published Price Theory in 1958, and was promoted to a personal chair as Professor of Industrial Economics in 1961, and then when Duncan retired in 1967 Ryan succeeded him as Whately Professor. In 1979, he stepped down from the chair and was appointed to another personal chair, as Professor of Political Economy. He left academia in 1985 and was elected a Member of the Royal Irish Academy in 1986. He received an honorary DSc degree from Ulster University in 1990.

=== Public service and banking ===
Ryan served as technical director of the Department of Finance's Economic Development Board from 1959 to 1961, and then served as its economic consultant until 1969; he was seconded from Trinity to work at the Department full-time from 1964 to 1966. During this time, he was involved in the implementation of T. K. Whitaker's First Programme for Economic Expansion, an economic programme for transforming the Republic of Ireland's economy from one dominated by agriculture (and then mired in depression) and protectionism, to one based on industry, services and free trade. The Irish Times noted in its obituary of Ryan that while "a significant amount of the credit for the transformation of the Irish economy... has been credited to the late T. K. Whitaker[,] in reality the transformation also owed a great deal to Whitaker's friend and academic ally Louden Ryan, and it may be more accurate to describe the successful transformation as due to the partnership between [them]". Ryan held various public offices thereafter, notably as chairman of the National Prices Commission from 1971 to 1975, chairman of the National Economic and Social Council from 1973 to 1978, and chairman of the National Planning Board between 1983 and 1984.

Appointed a director of the Central Bank of Ireland in 1966, Ryan became increasingly interested in finances. After retiring from that bank in 1978, he moved to the Bank of Ireland to sit on its board and in 1985, Ryan left academia to be its governor, serving until 1991. As governor, he attracted some criticism for his conservatism and lack of interest in credit expansion.

=== Later life ===
Ryan died on 19 November 2018; his wife Maudie predeceased him. He was survived by his daughter Jane McAfee, his son Jonathan Ryan, and his grandchildren Clare McAfee, James Ryan and Victoria Ryan.
