= Whately Professor of Political Economy =

The Whately Chair of Political Economy was established at Trinity College, Dublin by Richard Whately, in 1832. It was initially tenable for five years.

== Holders ==
- 1832 Mountifort Longfield
- 1836 Isaac Butt
- 1840 James Anthony Lawson
- 1846 William Neilson Hancock
- 1851 Richard Hussey Walsh
- 1856 John Elliot Cairnes
- 1861 Arthur Houston
- 1866 J. Slattery
- 1871 Robert Cather Donnell
- 1876 James Johnston Shaw
- 1882–1932 Charles Francis Bastable, whose tenure saw a change of system.
- 1934–1967 George Duncan
- 1967–1979 Louden Ryan
- 1979–2004 Dermot McAleese
- Philip Richard Lane, current holder
