= Richard Hussey Walsh =

Richard Hussey Walsh (1825–1862) was an Irish political economist and colonial official.

== Life ==
He was the fifth son of John Hussey Walsh of Kilduff, King's County, and his wife Maria, daughter of Michael Henley of La Mancha, County Dublin; his grandmother Margaret was the daughter and heiress of John Hussey of Mull Hussey, County Roscommon. Richard was educated at Trinity College, Dublin University, where he graduated B.A. in 1847, taking honours in mathematics and physics; in 1848 he won the senior mathematical prize founded by John Law.

On 5 May 1848 Walsh was admitted to Lincoln's Inn, but did not pursue the study of law. A Roman Catholic, he was precluded from a fellowship at Trinity College, and turned to political economy and the chance of competing for the Whately professorship. In the prize examination in 1850 he took first place, and was elected to a Barrington lectureship in political economy. In 1851 he was appointed Whately professor, a post lasting five years, and was elected one of the secretaries of the Dublin Statistical Society, a post which he held till 1857. During the winter of 1853 Walsh temporarily took on the duties of deputy professor of jurisprudence and political economy at Queen's College, Belfast, for William Neilson Hancock, and in 1856 he was appointed by government an assistant secretary of the Irish endowed schools commission.

Walsh was appointed superintendent of the government schools in Mauritius, and entered on his duties in May 1857. There he quickly increased the number of schools from 20 to 44. William Stevenson, Governor of Mauritius, then placed him on a commission inquiring into the civil service departments on the island; the work occupied nearly two years. At the end of his life he ran the census of the island taken in 1861.

Walsh died unmarried at Port Louis on 30 January 1862, after a brain haemorrhage.

== Works ==
Walsh specialised in monetary economics, and in 1853 published a lecture course, An Elementary Treatise on Metallic Currency. It was praised by contemporary economists, including John Stuart Mill and Nassau William Senior. The work took into account the context of the Bank Charter Act 1844, and the sequel Irish Bank Act 1845.

Walsh wrote also papers for the statistical section of the British Association, The Economist, and the Proceedings of the Dublin Statistical Society. In the context of the Crimean War and the fiscal policy imposed by William Gladstone to finance it, Walsh argued in 1855 against William Neilson Hancock that a "perfect" income tax (neither progressive nor regressive) was not a practical proposition.

== Notes ==
Attribution

This article incorporates text from a publication now in the public domain: Lee, Sidney, ed. (1899). "Walsh, Richard Hussey". Dictionary of National Biography. Vol. 59. London: Smith, Elder & Co.
