= Richard Gorges =

Richard Gorges may refer to:

- Richard Gorges (1662–1728), Anglo-Irish politician
- Richard Gorges (Augher MP) (1709–1778), Anglo-Irish politician
- Richard Gorges (Leominster MP) (c.1730–1780)
- Richard William Howard Gorges (c.1876–1944) Anglo-Irish soldier and criminal
- Sir Richard Gorges-Meredyth, 1st Baronet (born Richard Gorges, 1735–1821), Anglo-Irish politician and baronet

== See also ==
- Richard Georges, poet laureate of the British Virgin Islands
