= Kieran Kennedy (economist) =

Irish neo-Keynesian economist (1935–2013)

Kieran A. Kennedy, MRIA (14 July 1935 – 6 February 2013) was an Irish neo-Keynesian applied economist, economic historian and Director of the Economic and Social Research Institute (ESRI) from 1971 to 1996. A civil servant, lecturer and researcher, he worked with Fianna Fáil Taoiseach Charles Haughey to formulate his economic strategy The Way Forward and directed his and subsequent administrations from the 1980s until Kennedy's retirement.

== Biography ==
Kennedy was born on 14 July 1935 in Newbridge, County Kildare. He was the fourth of five sons born to Patrick Kennedy and Margaret Kennedy née Callahan. His father was a garda and was frequently transferred; consequently, Kennedy lived apart from his family on a farm with his grandmother in eastern Galway. He then re-joined his family in Limerick, where he was 'excellently' taught by the Congregation of Christian Brothers.

A devoted Marian, ecumenist and Catholic, Kennedy joined the Legion of Mary sometime before 1958 and spent one week each year evangelising among lapsed Catholic Irish in England. He was a friend of the Legion's founder Frank Duff and supported the latter's heretofore unsuccessful cause for canonisation after his death in 1980. In 1966, he married University College Dublin lecturer, future ESRI economist and fellow Legion member Finola Flanagan, after being introduced through Duff. Finola authored the so-called "seminal sociological study on the Irish family" for the ESRI in 1989, as well as Duff's 2008 entry in the Dictionary of Irish Biography which Kieran helped research.

After marrying, the Kennedys lived at Sydney Palace Avenue in Sandymount, Dublin and had three sons and three daughters: Kieran, Ruth, Michael, Susan, Lucy, Frank.

Kennedy was a teetotaller but smoked a pipe; he also walked, fished and watched sport on television, although he had apparently never owned one before 1987. After retirement he purposefully distanced himself from economics; he instead kept an interest in painting and fine arts, inspired by the book The Art of Painting. Early on, he also served as ombudsman for FÁS trainees.

Perhaps owing to his upbringing, Kennedy was in adulthood aloof; he was also stern, focussed, exacting and had the need to be fully absorbed in a task, leading the Sunday Independent to accuse the ESRI of being an "intellectual monastery with Dr Kennedy as its abbot". He had a lifelong Munster accent from his time in Limerick and was reportedly reserved but an engaging conversationalist.

Kennedy was made a Member of the Royal Irish Academy in 1973 and was entitled to use the designation MRIA. His paper The Role of Social Science in Relation to Public Policy was published in its proceedings that year.

Kennedy died aged 77 on 6 February 2013 in Clonskeagh Hospital, County Dublin after a long illness and was buried at Shanganagh Cemetery.

== Education and career ==
Although having qualified for both a state and corporation scholarship to university in 1953, he could accept neither and instead entered the civil service as an executive officer first in the Office of the Comptroller and Auditor General (1954), then the Department of Industry and Commerce (1955). He concurrently sat night classes at University College Dublin, earning degrees in public administration (1956) and commerce (1958).

In 1958, he won a competition to become an elite officer in the Department of Finance, but then had tuberculosis; whilst recovering, he read for a master's in economic sciences from UCD and graduated with first-class honours and a travelling scholarship for his dissertation in 1960. The Department's Secretary, and founder of the ESRI, T. K. Whitaker arranged Kennedy a leave of absence to study toward an economics degree at Nuffield College, Oxford under 1972 joint Nobel laureate Sir John Hicks. After graduating in 1963, he was awarded a teaching scholarship at Harvard University and received a PhD in economics under the tutelage of 1971 Nobel laureate Simon Kuznets in 1968.

Kennedy completed his doctoral thesis, Productivity and Industrial Growth. The Irish Experience, whilst assistant principal officer in economic policy at the Department of Finance and part-time lecturer at UCD; it would be his first book published in 1971 and variously commended as among the first academic studies of Ireland's twentieth-century economy, and his careful consideration of statistics. Therein, he argues the Salter correlation—the positive association of labour productivity growth and output growth—is owed to dynamic external economies.

In 1968, he was recommended first to the ESRI as a senior research officer, then as an economic consultant to the Central Bank of Ireland, before being elevated to succeed Michael Fogarty as director of the think tank in 1971, aged just 35. Under Kennedy, the Institute began publishing annual five-year forecasts alongside its short-term forecasts beginning 1986. He also facilitated the creation of an independent survey unit to augment official statistics. In 1979, an ESRI survey to which Kennedy had given "unwavering support" found 20.7% of Republic of Irish surveyed supported actions of the Irish Republican Army taken in relation to Northern Ireland to some degree. Political and internal backlash prompted Kennedy to both defend the methodology and publish two additional studies in 1980 that confirmed and criticised the original survey.

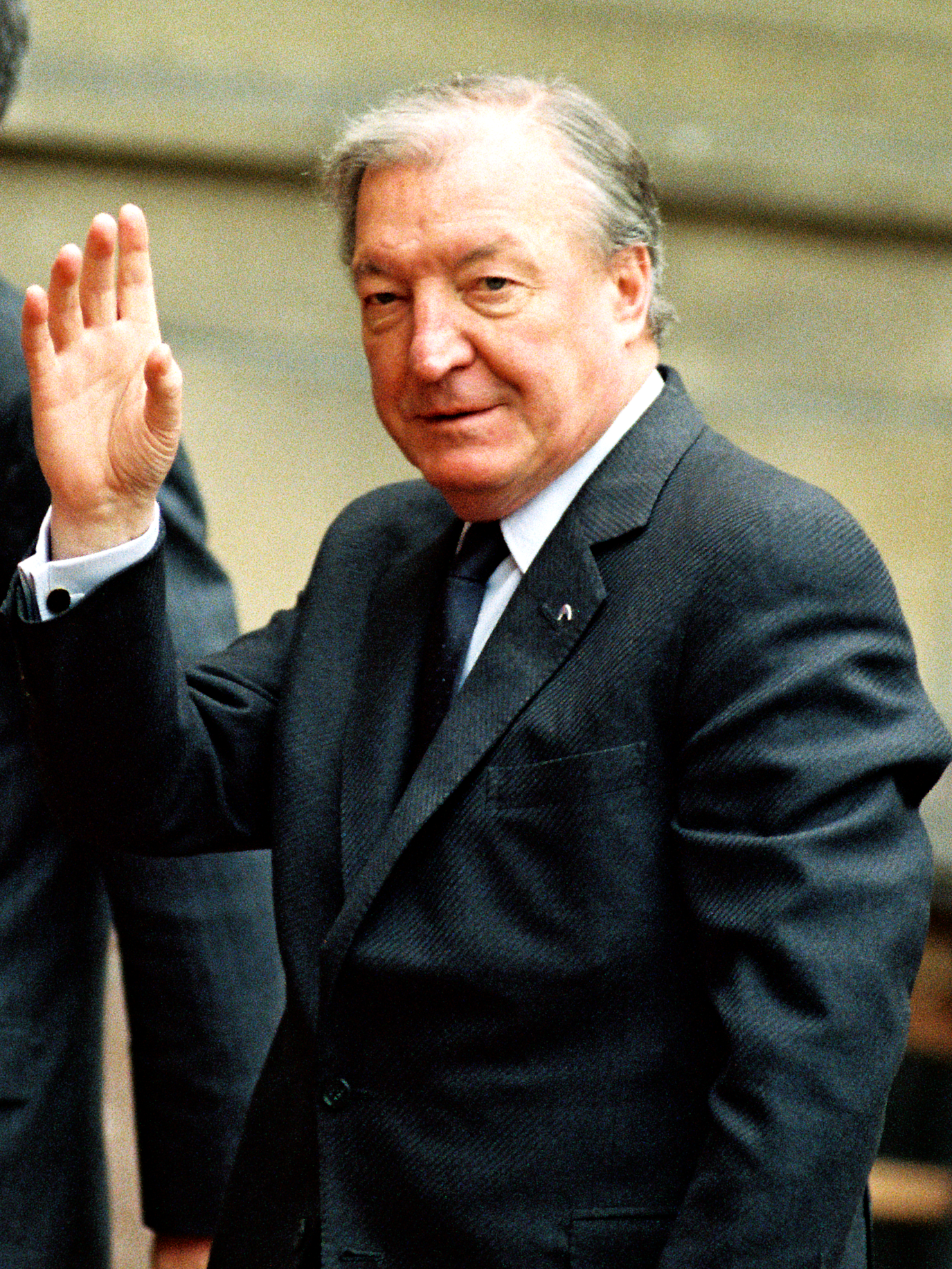
Haughey in 1989.

A consistent advocate of expenditure cuts throughout the 1970s, Kennedy was appointed by new Taoiseach Haughey to the steering committee in 1982 to create a plan to end the deficit. When published that October, The Way Forward belatedly encouraged fiscal restraint, but was criticised, including by senior Department of Finance officials, as being "highly optimistic" because it did not foresee an increase in taxes, for example. Other parties withdrew support and Haughey was defeated in the November election to a Fine Gael-Labour coalition; with his successor, Garret FitzGerald, Kennedy had only "an imperfect sympathy", whilst reportedly holding Haughey's intellect in great esteem.

Haughey was returned as Taoiseach in the 1987 general election, extending Fine Gael's budget cuts that Labour had rejected and using The Way Forward as a blueprint for economic recovery. The ESRI had its funding slashed, and he reneged on the accusation commissioned research would compromise the ESRI's independence; by 1995, most of its revenue derived from research commissioned or sponsored largely for state or European Union bodies, rather than a state grant or the American Ford Foundation, and increased its total full-time researchers from 25 to 40. Nevertheless, the ESRI maintained its independence and Kennedy criticised the government's industrial development strategy, which was largely affirmed during the Celtic Tiger years.

He continued to influence government policy toward small business supports and chaired a working group on the Irish punt's 10% devaluation in 1993 on the back of speculative attacks against the British pound (Black Wednesday) and Italian lira. He retired as director of the ESRI in October 1996 but continued for some years as a part-time researcher; his last publication with the institute, Reflections on the Process of Irish Economic Growth, was read before the Statistical and Social Inquiry Society of Ireland 26 April 2001.

Kennedy produced over seventy papers in his lifetime on economics and religion, and wrote, co-wrote or edited fourteen books focussing on unemployment, manufacturing and economic history, including The Irish Economy, co-authored with current Fine Gael TD Richard Bruton. He was involved with the early work of the Historical National Accounts Group for Ireland, founded 1994, that collects statistics from between the Great Famine and World War I, and delivered a Thomas Davis lecture for RTÉ on industrial development since the Famine.

== Politics and views ==
It will be clear that a satisfactory long-term resolution of the inflation-unemployment dilemma will involve an extension of the conventional boundaries of economics to take account of social and political variables – not only at national but also at international level.

— Kieran A. Kennedy, May 1983.

Kennedy was a statist and soft interventionist who recognised the constraints associated with Ireland's small, open economy and parties that benefit from a burgeoning private sector. He prioritised lowering unemployment, which he saw as a national failure, over particularly inflation or the deficit, possibly due to his charity work with the Legion of Mary. He proposed many ideas for reducing the deficit, including a balanced budget amendment to the Constitution; this, as well as supporting Ireland's membership of the European Exchange Rate Mechanism, "reflected an ethos of self-denial that found little purchase in an emerging consumer society", according to Clavin.

Kennedy attacked the Industrial Development Authority for attracting capital intensive industries from abroad that he accused of embellishing growth figures and leaving the country reliant on a multinational sector that created few jobs. Instead, he argued for the State supporting domestic industries that produced raw materials, and attacked successive governments for accumulating foreign debt in the 1970s. Some of his suggestions were implemented in the 1980s, but most were either diluted or cut entirely by unsympathetic civil servants.

While taking night classes at UCD, Kennedy befriended professor and Independent Seanad member George O'Brien, who wrote comforting letters for when he was recuperating from tuberculosis.
