= George Vaughan Hart (academic) =

Irish lawyer and Regius Professor

George Vaughan Hart, KC
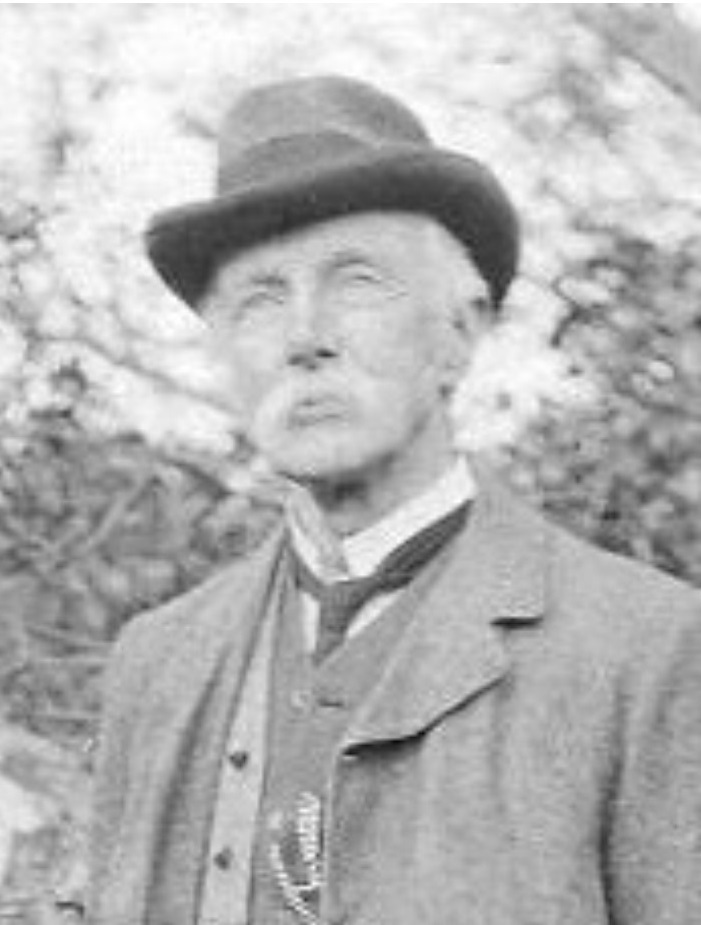
- George Vaughan Hart KC
- Born: 5 June 1841; Dublin, County Dublin, Ireland, United Kingdom of Great Britain and Ireland
- Died: 13 December 1912 (aged 71); Dublin, County Dublin, Ireland

George Vaughan Hart, KC (5 June 1841 – 13 December 1912) was an Anglo-Irish academic who served as Regius Professor of Feudal and English Law at Trinity College Dublin from 1890 to 1909.

== Life ==
Hart was born on 5 June 1841 to Sir Andrew S. Hart, sometime vice-provost of Trinity College Dublin, and his wife, Frances MacDougall, the daughter of Henry MacDougall QC, of Dublin. He was educated at St Columba's College, Dublin and Trinity College Dublin. He was the brother of the explorer and botanist Henry Chichester Hart. He was also a great-nephew of William Allman, a professor of Botany at Trinity College Dublin and the first cousin once removed of George Johnston Allman through his maternal grandmother, Frances Allman.

He was called to the Irish Bar in 1865. He was King's Inns Professor of Law of Personal Property from 1880 to 1886. He was appointed Chief Examiner of Titles, Land Judges, Dublin in 1890. His career culminated in his post as Regius Professor of Feudal and English Law at TCD from 1890 to 1909.

George Vaughan Hart was a keen gardener, owner of the house and garden at Woodside, Howth, County Dublin.

== Family ==
On 12 September 1873, he married Mary Elizabeth Hone, daughter of Addison Hone, a scion of the Hone family. They had seven children:

- Ethel Vaughan Hart (1875–1964). She married Sir Anthony Babington on 5 September 1907. The couple had three children: Mary, Emerson and Ruth.
- George Vaughan Hart (31 August 1877 – 8 September 1928). He married Maud Cullen and the couple had six children: George, Frances, Andrew, John, Edward and Ann. George Vaughan Hart and two of his sons (Andrew and John) died in a bathing accident on the coast of County Donegal in 1928.
- Norah Searle Hart (3 October 1879 – 1965). She married Mr Roberts of the Royal Ulster Constabulary. The couple had no children.
- Hilda Chichester Hart (31 December 1882 – 1967). She married Geoffrey Surtees Phillpotts, son of James Surtees Phillpotts. The couple had five children: Dorothy, James, Mary Elizabeth (Betty), George and Brian.
- Tristram Beresford Hart (6 March 1884 – 1963). He married Hon. Vivian Parker, daughter of Robert Parker, Baron Parker of Waddington. The couple had no children.
- William Hume Hart (6 April 1885 - 1976), medical doctor. He married Margot Miller. The couple had no children.
- Ruth Hart (20 December 1866 – 1977). She married Rt. Hon. Andrew Jameson. The couple had no children (though Jameson had children by a previous marriage).

== Photographs ==
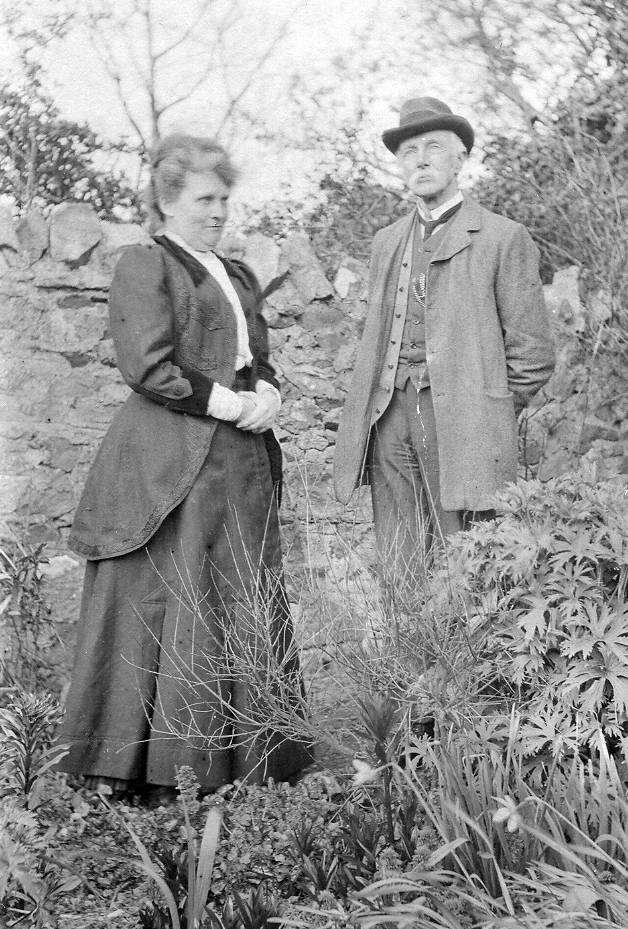
G V Hart and Mary Hart in their garden at Woodside, Howth, County Dublin, c 1900

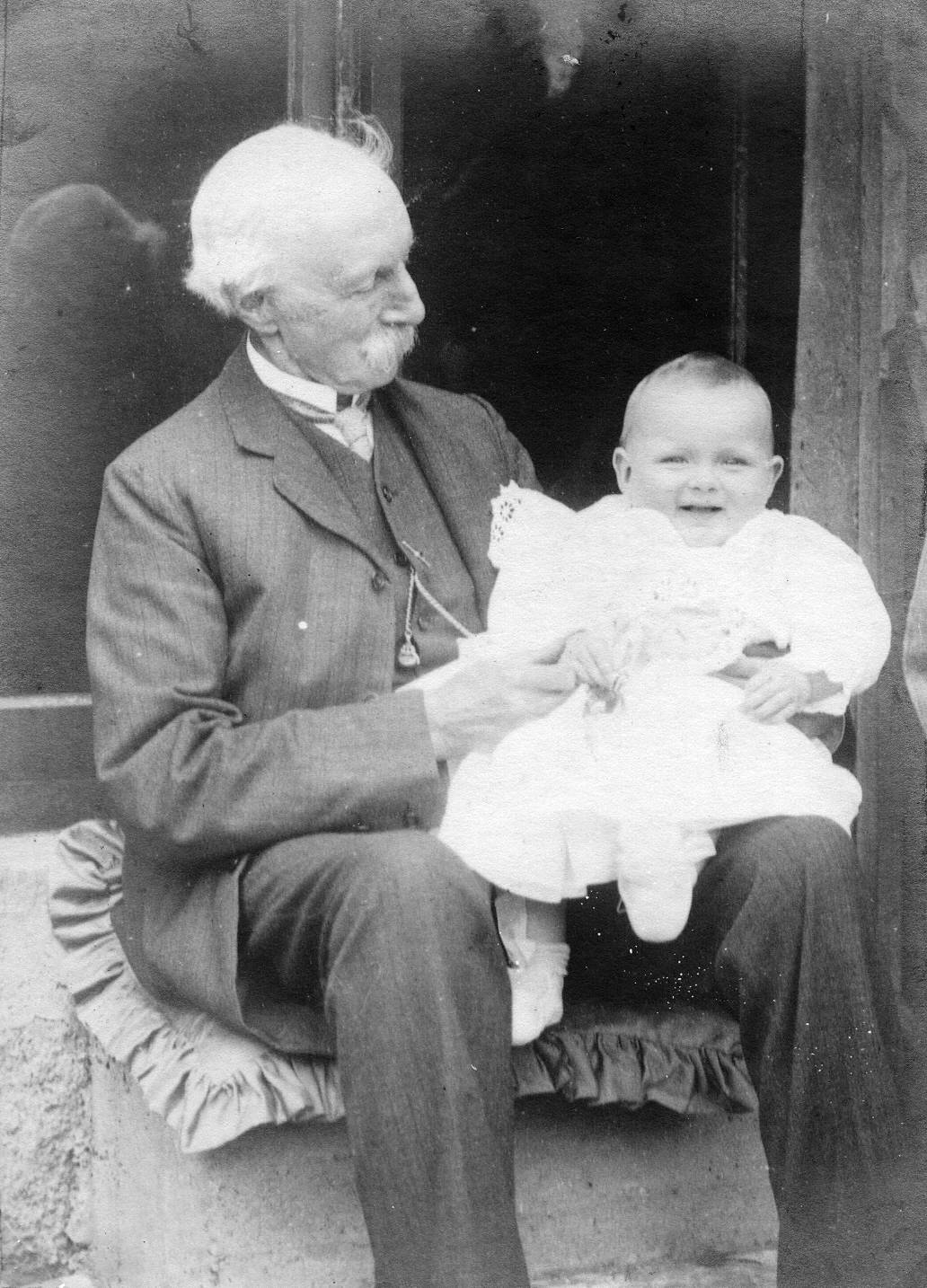
G V Hart with his first granddaughter Mary, 1908

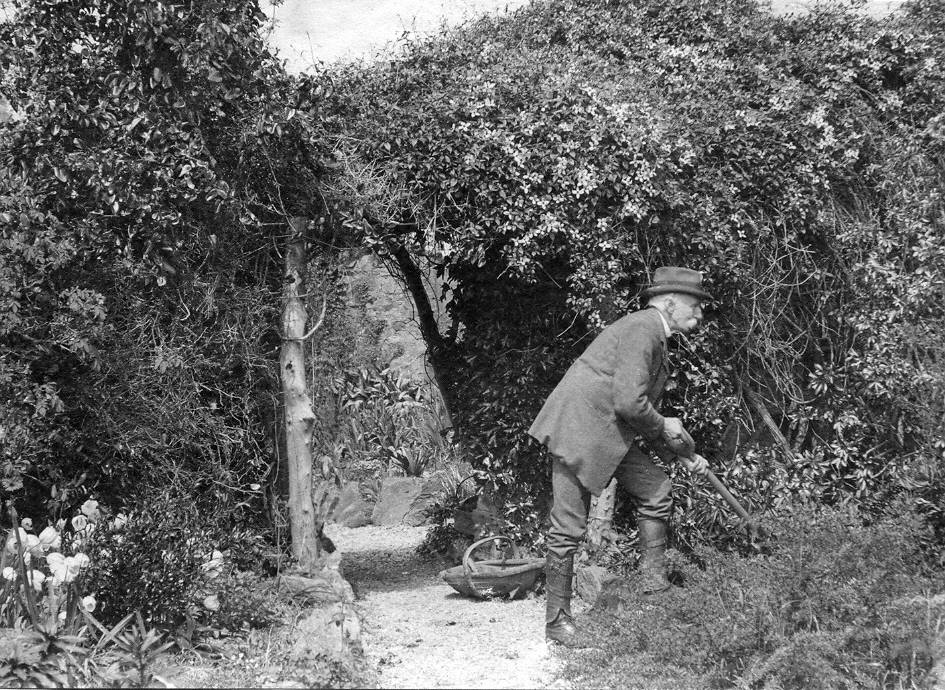
G V Hart gardening
