= Andrew Hart =

Andrew Hart may refer to:

- Andrew Hart (rugby league) (born 1976), Australian rugby league footballer
- Andrew Hart (runner) (born 1969), retired English middle-distance runner
- Andrew Searle Hart (1811–1890), mathematician and vice-provost of Trinity College, Dublin
