= W. H. Murray =

Scottish mountaineer and writer

William Hutchison Murray, OBE (18 March 1913 – 19 March 1996) was a Scottish mountaineer and writer, one of a group of active mountain climbers, mainly from Clydeside, before and just after World War II.

== Life ==
Murray was born in Liverpool, the son of William Hutchison Murray (1878–1915), of Cairndhu, Queens Drive, Mossley Hill, H.M. Inspector of Mines for Liverpool and North Wales, who was killed at Gallipoli whilst serving as a sapper with the Royal Marines, and his wife Helen (née Robertson). He was subsequently raised at Huntly Terrace, North Kelvinside, Glasgow. His paternal grandparents, William Hutchison Murray (b. 1850; a wool manufacturer who, on losing all the money he had invested in the 1878 collapse of the City of Glasgow Bank, became a respected music teacher at Anderson College, Glasgow, later becoming Music Inspector for the Glasgow Board of Education, and conductor of the Glasgow Choral Society) and Margaret Hesketh (née Jenkins), lived at Giffnock, East Renfrewshire.

Murray did much of his most influential climbing in the period just before World War II. He climbed on many occasions with the slightly older J. H. B. Bell.

At the outbreak of World War II, he joined the Argyll and Sutherland Highlanders and was posted to the Middle East and North Africa. He was captured south of Mersa Matruh during the Western Desert Campaign in a retreat to El Alamein in June 1942 by a tank commander from the 15th Panzer Division who was armed with a machine-pistol. A passage in Mountain magazine (#67, 1979) describes the moments after his capture:

To my astonishment, he [the German tank commander] forced a wry smile and asked in English, 'Aren't you feeling the cold?' ... I replied 'cold as a mountain top'. He looked at me, and his eyes brightened. 'Do you mean – you climb mountains?' He was a mountaineer. We both relaxed. He stuffed his gun away. After a few quick words – the Alps, Scotland, rock and ice – he could not do enough for me.

He then spent three years in prisoner of war camps in Italy (Chieti), Germany (Moosberg, Brunswick) and Czechoslovakia (Marisch Trubeau Oflag VIII-F). While imprisoned, Murray wrote a book entitled Mountaineering in Scotland. The first draft of the work was written on the only paper available to him – rough toilet paper. The manuscript was found and destroyed by the Gestapo. To the incredulity of his fellow prisoners, Murray's response to the loss was to start again, despite the risk of its loss and his physical condition being so poor from the near starvation diet that he believed he would never climb again. The rewritten work was finally published in 1947 and was followed by the sequel, Undiscovered Scotland, in 1951. Both concentrate on Scottish winter climbing and were widely credited with helping to inspire the post-war renaissance in the sport.

Murray was deputy leader to Eric Shipton on the 1951 Everest Reconnaissance Expedition, but failed to acclimatise at altitude and so was not included in the 1953 team. He also explored part of the Api group in Nepal with John Tyson in 1953. He was an active campaigner to protect wilderness areas of Scotland from ill-considered development. In 1961, a major success was the defeat of plans to build a hydroelectric scheme in Glen Nevis.

He won many awards, including the Literary Award of the U.S.A. Education Board, an honorary doctorate from Stirling University and the Mungo Park Medal for Himalayan exploration. He settled with his wife, Anne B. Murray (née Clark), in Argyll. He was appointed O.B.E. in the 1966 New Years Honours for services to Mountaineering in Scotland.

His autobiography, The Evidence of Things Not Seen, won the Grand Prize of the Banff Mountain Book Festival (2002). The book was completed on his death by his wife Anne, who also contributed some of her poetry and its title links to the title of the penultimate chapter of his earlier book Mountaineering in Scotland where Murray quoted a passage from the KJV translation of the New Testament which states that "faith is the evidence of things not seen" (Epistle to the Hebrews, chapter 11, verse 1).

== Honours ==
- 1966 – O.B.E.
- 1970 – Honorary Doctorate, Stirling University, Scotland
- 1991 – Doctor of Letters (DLitt), University of Strathclyde, Scotland: – William H Murray, Mountaineer and Author July 1991

=== Scottish decorations ===
- Royal Scottish Geographical Society: – Mungo Park Medal, 1952

== Goethe ==
A quotation by Murray is widely misattributed to Johann Wolfgang von Goethe. The following passage occurs near the beginning of Murray's The Scottish Himalayan Expedition (1951):

... but when I said that nothing had been done I erred in one important matter. We had definitely committed ourselves and were halfway out of our ruts. We had put down our passage money— booked a sailing to Bombay. This may sound too simple, but is great in consequence. Until one is committed, there is hesitancy, the chance to draw back, always ineffectiveness. Concerning all acts of initiative (and creation), there is one elementary truth, the ignorance of which kills countless ideas and splendid plans: that the moment one definitely commits oneself, then Providence moves too. All sorts of things occur to help one that would never otherwise have occurred. A whole stream of events issues from the decision, raising in one's favour all manner of unforeseen incidents and meetings and material assistance, which no man could have dreamt would have come his way. I learned a deep respect for one of Goethe's couplets:

Whatever you can do or dream you can, begin it.
Boldness has genius, power and magic in it!

The "Goethe couplet" referred to here is from an extremely loose translation of Goethe's Faust lines 214-30 made by John Anster in 1835.

== Works ==
=== Mountaineering in Scotland and the Greater Ranges ===
- Mountaineering in Scotland (1947) ISBN 1-898573-23-9
- Rock Climbs: Glencoe and Ardgour. 1949. OCLC 29523513.
- Undiscovered Scotland: Climbs on Rock, Snow, and Ice. 1951. OCLC 8149854.
- The Scottish Himalayan Expedition. 1951. OCLC 1725730.
- Story of Everest. 1953. OCLC 1235607.
- The Craft of Climbing. 1951. OCLC 11478230.
- Glencoe, Blackmount and Lochaber : a regional guide. 1964. OCLC 30225722.
- Scotland's Mountains (1987) ISBN 0907521150

=== Scottish Culture, Nature & Wildlife ===
- Highland Landscape: A Survey. National Trust for Scotland. 1962. OCLC 226123010.
- Hebrides. 1966. OCLC 4998389.
- Companion Guide to the Western Highlands of Scotland (1968 and revised in 1969, 73, 72, 73 and 74 – ISBN 0-00-211135-7)
- The Islands of Western Scotland (1973) ISBN 9780413261007
- The Scottish Highlands (1976) ISBN 9780901516831
- Beautiful Scotland (1976) ISBN 9780713432176
- The Companion Guide to the West Highlands of Scotland. London: William Collins Sons & Co. Ltd. 1977. ISBN 0-00-216813-8.
- The Curling Companion (1981) ISBN 9780002168649

=== Historical Biography ===
- Rob Roy MacGregor – His Life and Times (1982) ISBN 0862415381

=== Autobiography ===
- The Evidence of Things Not Seen: A Mountaineer's Tale (2002) (autobiography) ISBN 1-898573-24-7

=== Fiction ===
- Five Frontiers. 1959. OCLC 7871458.
- The Spurs of Troodos. 1960. OCLC 30244236.
- Maelstrom. 1962. OCLC 11021863.
- Dark Rose the Phoenix. 1965. OCLC 1318078.
- The Real Mackay. 1969. ISBN 9780434482023.

=== Biography ===
- "The Sunlit Summit: The Life of W. H. Murray" by Robin Lloyd-Jones (Author), Robert Macfarlane (Forward) (Sandstone Press Ltd, 2013), ISBN 1908737387 and ISBN 978-1908737380
