= Frances P. Ruane =

Irish economist

Professor Frances Ruane
- Born: 22 January 1951 (age 75); Tuam, Galway, Ireland
- Citizenship: Irish
- Spouse(s): J. Peter Neary (1972–90), James Slevin (1999–)

Academic background
- Education: University College Dublin

Academic work
- Discipline: Industrial economics
- Institutions: Trinity College Dublin, ESRI
- Awards: Honorary Fellowship, TCD

Frances Philomena Ruane, MRIA, is an Irish academic economist and former director of the Economic and Social Research Institute (ESRI) in Dublin, Ireland 2006−2015. She is recognised for her research on FDI and its effect on host economies. She has also been a regular appointee to State and public policy boards and committees, including most recently acting as Chair of the Statistical and Social Inquiry Society of Ireland (2016-2019) and the National Competitiveness Council (since 2019).

== Early life ==
She is a native of Tuam, County Galway. She entered University College Dublin in 1968 and graduated in 1971 with a B.A. in Economics, Politics & Statistics, and in 1973 with an M.A. in Econometrics and Statistics.

== Career ==
=== Early career ===
Between 1971 and 1974, she worked as a Planning Officer at the Industrial Development Authority, which spawned her interest in FDI, and subsequently as a Research Economist at the Central Bank of Ireland. Between 1974 and 1979, she undertook a MPhil and then a DPhil in Economics, at Nuffield College in Oxford. It was in Oxford that she got her first lecturing experience, teaching at Balliol College between 1975 and 1977.

=== Career in higher education ===
In 1977, after her MPhil, and while still studying for her DPhil, she took up a teaching post at Trinity College, Dublin, becoming a Fellow in 1985 and promoted to Associate Professor in 1991. She was Bursar of Trinity College between 1991 and 1995 and Head of the Economics Department 1997-2000, the first female to have the role since the foundation of the Department. She was Editor of the Economic and Social Review between 1981 and 1984 and was Research Director of the Foundation for Fiscal Studies between 1989 and 1996. Between 1998 and 2004, she served as Vice-President (1998-2000), President (2000-2002) and Vice-President (2002-2004) of the Irish Economics Association. In 2001, she ran unsuccessfully, as a candidate for Provost of Trinity College, an event later described by Prof Jane Ohlmeyer as important for encouraging women to take on leadership roles in the Irish public service, creating "a crack in the glass ceiling". In 2003, she was made a member of the Royal Irish Academy.

In 2002, together with other economists, she warned against "Benchmarking" pay increases proposed for Ireland's public sector. This prediction of significant economic costs was largely borne out following the end of Ireland's Celtic Tiger bubble, as the government was faced with a very large current spending deficit, following its permanent spending commitments on the back of temporary taxation revenues. Her interest in public policy led to the publication of "Governance and Policy Making in Ireland", co-edited with Donal de Buitléir, in 2003 and "Using Evidence to Inform Policy", co-edited with Pete Lunn, in 2013.

Her principal academic research interests relate to FDI. Through her research, Ruane has contributed to the understanding of international economics, industrial development, structural change, and firm heterogeneity. For her academic research and public service, she was recognised with an Honorary Fellowship by Trinity College Dublin in 2010 and was invited to give the 21st Leonard Abrahamson Memorial Lecture by the Royal College of Surgeons in Ireland in 2011. She served as a member of the Council of the Royal Irish Academy between 2012 and 2015.

=== ESRI & later career ===
She succeeded Brendan Whelan as director of the ESRI on 1 December 2006 and retired in 2015. During her tenure as ESRI Director and since, Ruane has appeared regularly in the media.

== Public body and voluntary roles ==
She has served on many committees and boards, including the Higher Education Authority, the Health Research Board, the Council of Economic Advisers (Scotland), the National Statistics Board, the European Advisory Committee on Statistical Information in the Economic and Social Spheres, the National Board for Science and Technology, and the boards of the Industrial Development Authority, Forfás, and Bord Gáis.

From 2016 to 2019, she served as Chair of the Statistical and Social Inquiry Society of Ireland, one of Ireland's oldest learned societies; she was only the second female Chair in the Society's 170-year existence, after Thekla Beere. In 2017, she was named chair of the board at the Abbey Theatre. Since 2019, she has been Chair of Ireland's National Competitiveness Council.
