= Richard William Howard Gorges =

British jewel thief

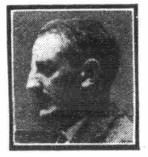
Captain Richard Howard Gorges at his trial 1915

Richard William Howard Gorges (c1876-1944) came from an Irish family of Norman descent. He served in the Boer War and was later implicated in the theft of the Irish Crown Jewels. He was never prosecuted for this offence, but was later found guilty of shooting a policeman and was sentenced to 12 years in prison.

== Family ==
Richard William Howard Gorges was from the Irish branch of the Norman Gorges family that had settled in England in the early 13th century. His great-great-grandfather was Gorges Edmond Howard, his great-grandfather was Captain Hamilton Gorges, M.P., of Kilbrew and Ballygowley, and his father was Major John Arthur Howard Gorges. His mother, Mary Kelly, was a published author and poet who was descended from Arthur French of Frenchpark, County Roscommon. (Note: The Irish branch of the Gorges family invariably gave their male children the middle name of Howard.)

== South Africa ==
Gorges was born in Boyle, County Roscommon in 1876 and in about 1888 moved to South Africa, where he had family connections. (Note: Army records give Gorges date of birth as February 14, 1876, other sources indicate that his date of birth was February 14, 1874.) He fought in the Second Matabele War (1896) and joined the Cape police force in 1897; on his application form for the Cape Police he claimed that he had spent eighteen months in the Royal Canadian Dragoons. He next fought in the Boer War, first as a trooper with Thorneycroft’s Mounted Infantry from November 1899, but was dishonourably discharged in March 1900 for alleged sodomy. He then became an orderly with the Imperial Hospital Corps from May to September 1900, later joining Scott’s Railway Guards as a lieutenant in April 1901, leaving in September 1901. His final posting in South Africa was as a lieutenant in the Border Scouts from November 1901 to May 1902. In November 1902 he was back in Britain, where he joined the 3rd Battalion, Royal Irish Regiment, as an instructor in musketry with the rank of captain.

== Irish Crown Jewels ==
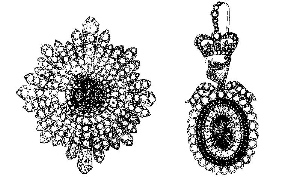
The Irish Crown Jewels. This image was published by the Royal Irish Constabulary and the Dublin Metropolitan Police

The “Irish Crown Jewels” were a set of insignia comprising the jewelled Order of St Patrick and a diamond encrusted badge with chain. The precious stones that made up the pieces came from jewellery previously owned by Queen Charlotte and King George III. These items had ceremonial significance and were held in Dublin castle under the charge of Sir Arthur Vicars, who was the Ulster King of Arms. The jewels, kept in a safe in Sir Arthur’s office, were found to be missing on 6 July 1907, and the circumstance led the police to believe that the robbery was an "inside job". Many theories were put forward as to who was involved with the theft; one of those under suspicion at the time was Captain Richard Howard Gorges. He was publicly named by the Irish Member of Parliament Laurence Ginnell (1852–1923) in a speech he made in the House of Commons on 20 December 1912, under the protection of Parliamentary Privilege. He said of Gorges that while in South Africa he had been "a reckless bully, a robber, a murderer, a bugger, and a sod". He also intimated that Gorges was not being prosecuted in order "to conceal crimes much worse than theft".

Gorges was never charged, and the crime remains unsolved. He resigned his commission on 9 August 1908, leaving the army until the outbreak of World War I, when he joined the 9th Battalion, the Border Regiment, on 5 September 1914. However, he relinquished his commission on 20 January 1915, later blaming headaches and a drinking problem.

== Death of a policeman ==
On 14 July 1915, Detective Sergeant Askew and Detective Constable Arthur Young went to serve a warrant on Gorges in his Mount Vernon, Hampstead, flat; the warrant was for “indulgence in illegal sexual practices” and the police officers were unarmed. The police had already visited the flat when Gorges was out, and had removed a revolver and 197 rounds of ammunition of two different calibres. They had also been told by someone who knew Gorges of his threats to shoot any policeman who attempted to lay a hand on him. When they eventually confronted Gorges they asked if they could talk to him privately; he at first agreed, but then pulled a second revolver and fired almost point blank at Detective Young. Askew managed to wrestle Gorges to the floor, and with help subdued him. A doctor later pronounced Detective Young dead at the scene.

At the murder trial, Gorges told of headaches he had been having from the sunstroke he had suffered while fighting in Matabeleland. He also said that he had consumed large amounts of alcohol on the day of the shooting, a story confirmed by witnesses. The jury found him guilty of manslaughter, and he was sentenced to twelve years’ imprisonment, being released from jail in 1925.

== Wealthy brother ==
In May 1941, Gorges was arrested and sent to jail for obtaining clothes from Simpsons of Piccadilly with a worthless cheque. He told the court at the trial that he was waiting for money from his brother, who had married an American millionairess. Although this seemed improbable, it was actually not far from the truth. Gorges' brother was Raymond Charles Howard Gorges (1877–1943), who in 1912 married the American Grace (Vernon) Dodge (1870–1953). She was the widow of Norman White Dodge, who made his wealth from lumber, but was also a member of the family that started Phelps, Dodge & Co., one of the largest copper producers in the world. Her step-son was Marcellus Hartley Dodge Sr., who married Ethel Geraldine Rockefeller, both of them multi-millionaires. Raymond Gorges was a writer and painter and lived with his wife in America. He compiled the history of the Gorges family that was published in 1944.

== Death ==
Richard William Howard Gorges died under the wheels of a London underground train in January 1944. The coroner recorded an open verdict.

Although his brother, Raymond, appears to have provided financial support during his later life, Captain Richard Gorges' name has been removed from the family history and is no longer shown in Burke's Landed Gentry.
