= Charles Bastable =

Irish economist

Charles Francis Bastable, FBA (1855–1945) was an Irish economist. He was Whately Professor of Political Economy (1882–1932) and Regius Professor of Laws (1908–1932) at Trinity College, Dublin.

The son of a priest, he studied at Trinity College, Dublin from 1873 to 1878, graduating with a first-class BA in history and political science. After graduating, Bastable considered a legal career and was called to the bar in Ireland in 1881, but the following year he successfully sat the five-yearly examination for the Whatley Professorship and during his tenure the statutes were altered allowing him to be re-elected without examination. He remained in the chair until retiring in 1932. He was also professor of jurisprudence and political economy at Queen's College, Galway, from 1883 to 1903; and professor of jurisprudence and international law at Trinity College between 1902 and 1908. Bastable made significant contributions to theories of international trade and finance. He was a founding member of the Royal Economic Society and in 1915 he was elected a Fellow of the British Academy, the United Kingdom's national academy for the social sciences.

Academic offices
Preceded by James Johnston Shaw	Whately Professor of Political Economy at Trinity College, Dublin; 1882-1932	Succeeded by George Alexander Duncan
