= Irish Crown Jewels =

State Jewels of Ireland

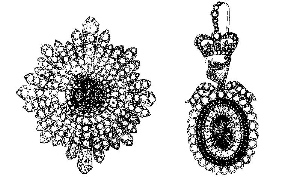
Image of the Irish Crown Jewels, as published by the Royal Irish Constabulary and the Dublin Metropolitan Police twice a week after the theft of the items was discovered in July 1907

The Jewels of the Order of St Patrick, commonly called the Irish Crown Jewels, were the heavily jewelled badge and star created in 1831 for the Grand Master of the Order of St Patrick, an order of knighthood established in 1783 by George III to be an Irish equivalent of the English Order of the Garter and the Scottish Order of the Thistle. The office of Grand Master was held by the Lord Lieutenant of Ireland.

The jewels were stolen from Dublin Castle in 1907, along with the collars of five knights of the order. The theft has never been solved, and the items have never been recovered.

== History ==
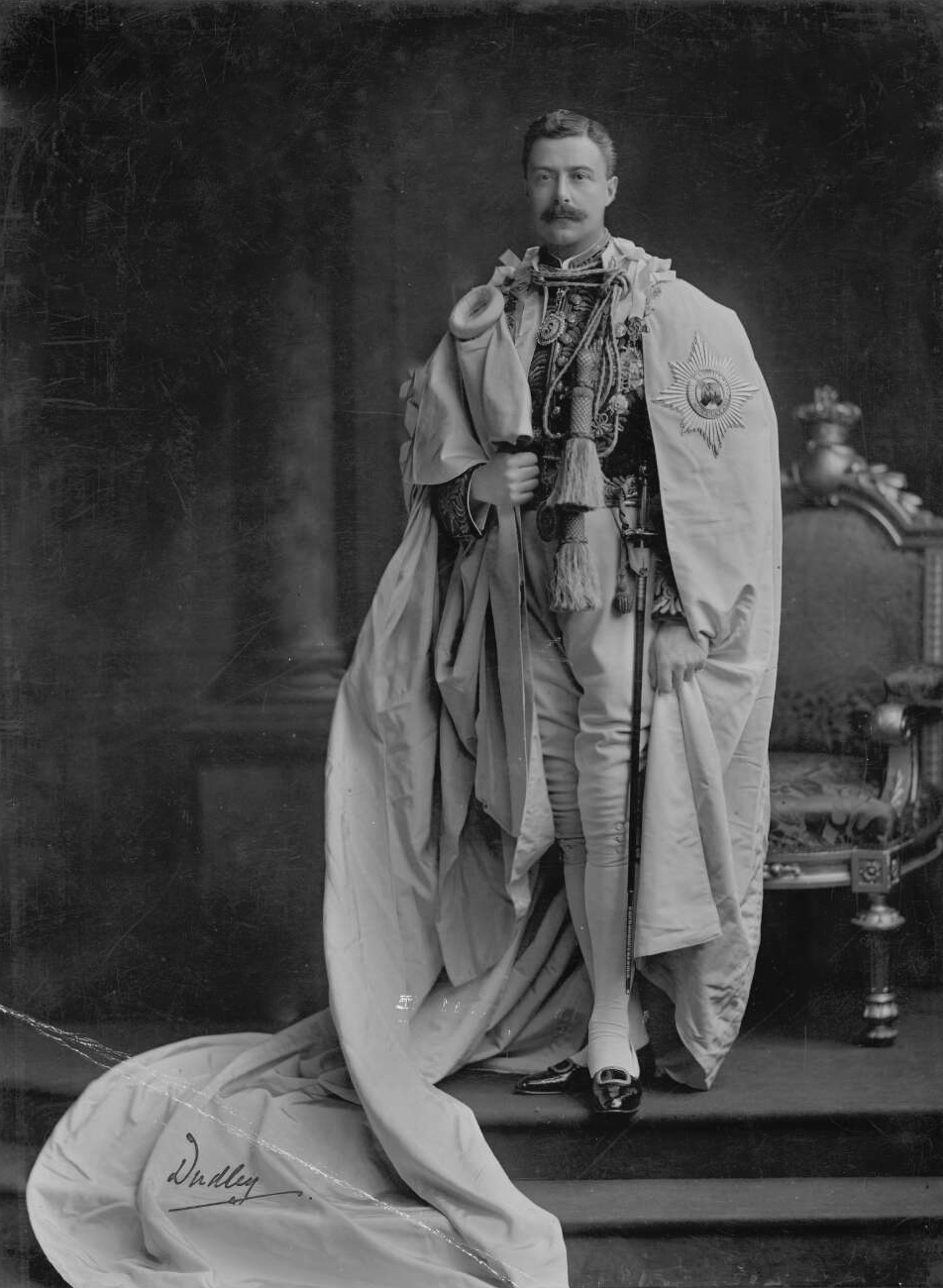
The Earl of Dudley as Viceroy of Ireland and Grand Master of the Order of St Patrick

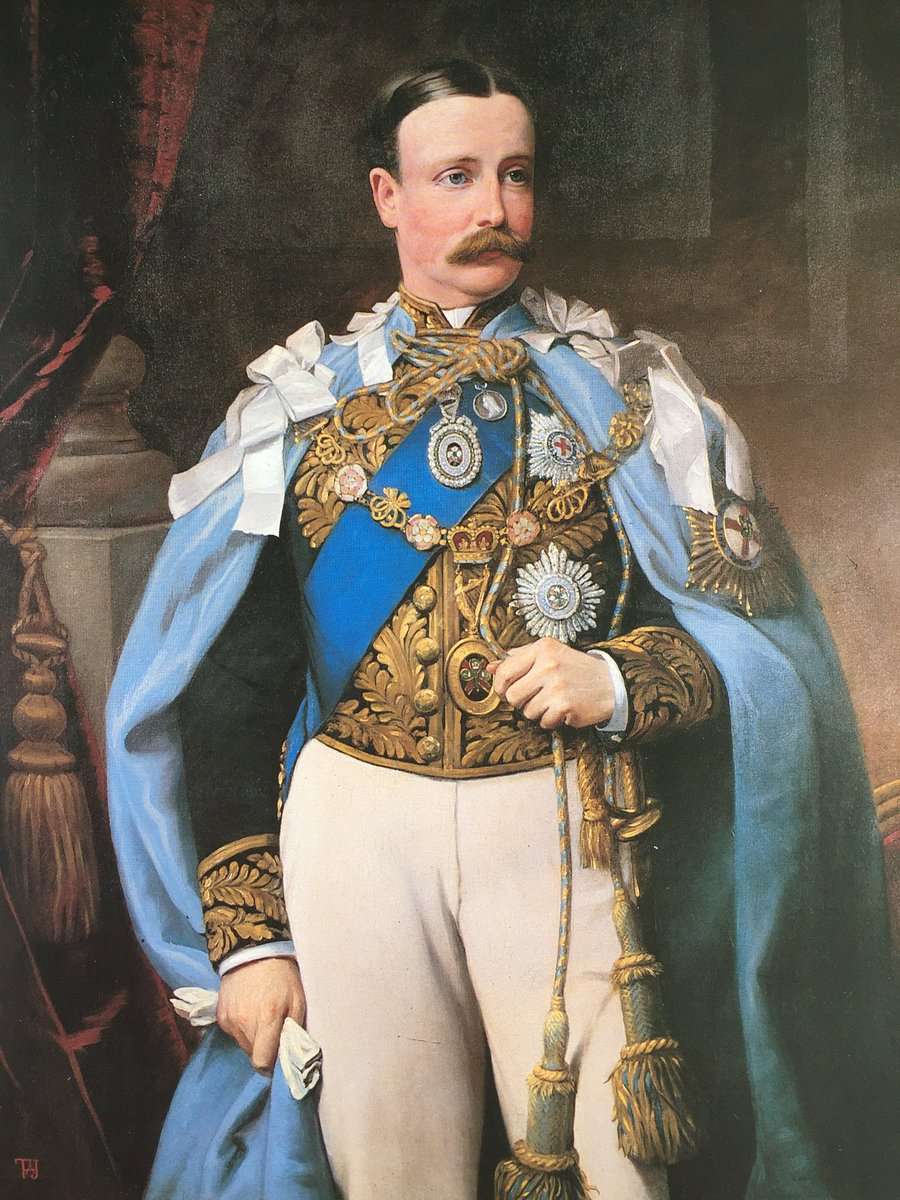
The Marquess of Londonderry as Viceroy and Grand Master

The original regalia of the Grand Master were only slightly more opulent than the insignia of an ordinary member of the order; the king's 1783 ordinance said they were to be "of the same materials and fashion as those of Our Knights, save only those alterations which befit Our dignity". The regalia were replaced in 1831 by new ones presented by William IV as part of a revision of the order's structure. They were delivered from London to Dublin on 15 March by the Earl of Erroll in a mahogany box together with a document titled "A Description of the Jewels of the Order of St. Patrick, made by command of His Majesty King William the Fourth, for the use of the Lord Lieutenant of Ireland, and which are Crown Jewels." They contained 394 precious stones taken from the English Crown Jewels of Queen Charlotte and the Order of the Bath star of her husband George III. The jewels were assembled by Rundell & Bridge. On the badge, of St Patrick's blue enamel, the green shamrock was of emeralds and the red saltire of rubies; the motto of the order was in pink diamonds and the encrustation was of Brazilian diamonds of the first water. Notices issued after the theft described the jewels thus:

A Diamond Star of the Grand Master of the Order of St. Patrick composed of brilliants (Brazilian stones) of the purest water, 4 5/8 by 4 1/4 inches, consisting of eight points, four greater and four lesser, issuing from a centre enclosing a cross of rubies and a trefoil of emeralds surrounding a sky blue enamel circle with words, "Quis Separabit MDCCLXXXIII." in rose diamonds engraved on back. Value about £14,000. (equivalent to £1,460,000 in 2025).

A Diamond Badge of the Grand Master of the Order of St. Patrick set in silver containing a trefoil in emeralds on a ruby cross surrounded by a sky blue enamelled circle with "Quis Separabit MDCCLXXXIII." in rose diamonds surrounded by a wreath of trefoils in emeralds, the whole enclosed by a circle of large single Brazilian stones of the finest water, surmounted by a crowned harp in diamonds and loop, also in Brazilian stones. Total size of oval 3 by 2 3/8 inches; height 5 5/8 inches. Value £16,000. (equivalent to £1,660,000 in 2025).

When not being worn or cleaned, the insignia of the Grand Master and those of deceased knights were in the custody of the Ulster King of Arms, the senior Irish herald, and kept in a bank vault. The description "Crown Jewels" was officially applied to the star and badge regalia in a 1905 revision of the order's statutes. The label "Irish Crown Jewels" was publicised by newspapers after their theft.

== Theft ==
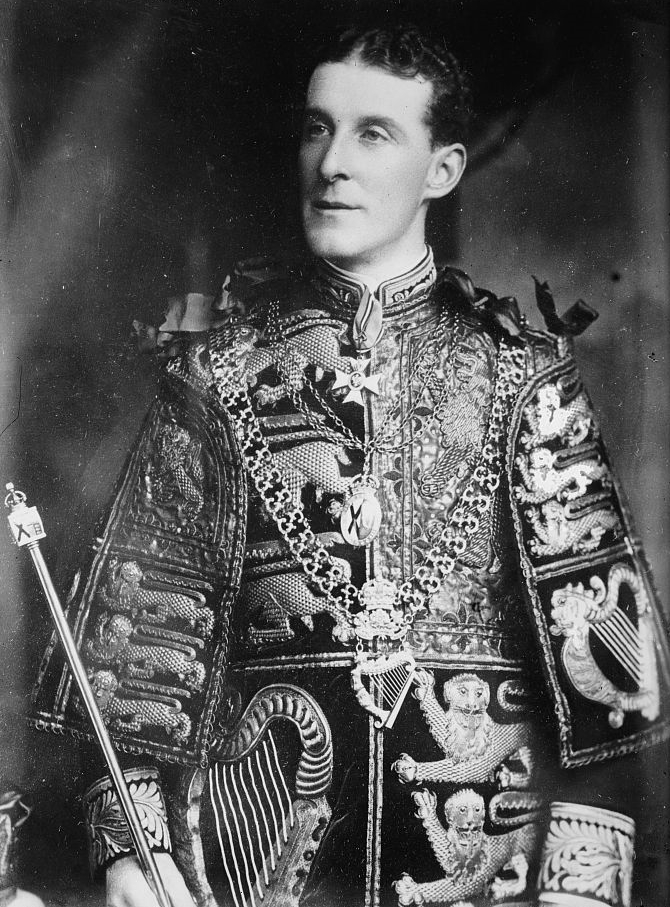
Sir Arthur Vicars

In 1903, the Office of Arms, the Ulster King of Arms's office within the Dublin Castle complex, was transferred from the Bermingham Tower to the Bedford or Clock Tower. The jewels were transferred to a new safe, which was to be placed in the newly constructed strongroom. The new safe was too large for the doorway to the strongroom, and Sir Arthur Vicars, the Ulster King of Arms, instead had it placed in his library. Seven latch keys to the door of the Office of Arms were held by Vicars and his staff, and two keys to the safe containing the regalia were both in the custody of Vicars. Vicars was known to get drunk on overnight duty and he once awoke to find the jewels around his neck. It is not known whether this was a prank or practice for the actual theft.

The regalia were last worn by the Lord Lieutenant, the Earl of Aberdeen, on 15 March 1907, at a function to mark Saint Patrick's Day. They were last known to be in the safe on 11 June, when Vicars showed them to a visitor to his office. The jewels were discovered to be missing on 6 July 1907, four days before the start of a visit by King Edward VII and Queen Alexandra to the Irish International Exhibition; Lord Castletown was set to be invested into the order during the visit. The theft is reported to have angered the king, but the visit went ahead. However, the investiture ceremony was cancelled. Some family jewels inherited by Vicars and valued at £1,500 (equivalent to £160,000 in 2025) were also stolen, along with the collars of five members of the order: four living (the Marquess of Ormonde and the Earls of Howth, Enniskillen, and Mayo) and one deceased (the Earl of Cork). These were valued at £1,050 (equivalent to £110,000 in 2025).

=== Investigation ===
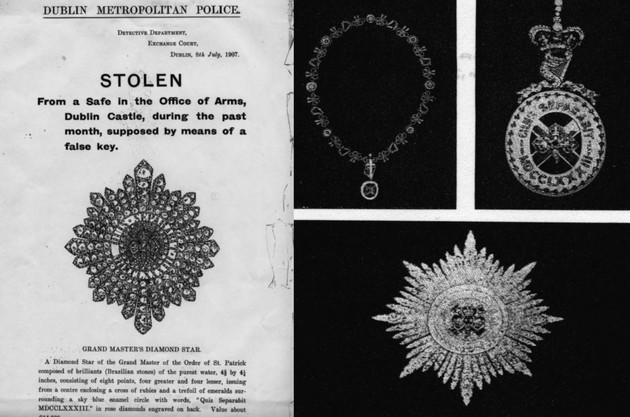
Dublin Police notice of theft of crown jewels

A police investigation was conducted by the Dublin Metropolitan Police. Posters issued by the force depicted and described the missing jewels. Detective Chief Inspector John Kane of Scotland Yard arrived on 12 July to assist. His report, never released, is said to have named the culprit and to have been suppressed by the Royal Irish Constabulary. Vicars refused to resign his position, and similarly refused to appear at a Viceregal Commission under Judge James Johnston Shaw into the theft held from 10 January 1908. Vicars argued for a public Royal Commission instead, which would have had power to subpoena witnesses. He publicly accused his second in command, Francis (Frank) Shackleton, Dublin Herald of Arms, of the theft. Kane explicitly denied to the Commission that Shackleton, brother of the explorer Ernest Shackleton, was involved. Shackleton was exonerated in the commission's report, and Vicars was found to have "not exercise[d] due vigilance or proper care as the custodian of the regalia." Vicars was compelled to resign, as were all the staff in his personal employ.

=== Rumours and theories ===
In 1908, the Irish journalist Bulmer Hobson published an account of the theft in a radical American newspaper, The Gaelic American, using information he had received from Vicars' half-brother Pierce O'Mahony. It stated that the culprits were Shackleton and a military officer, Richard Gorges. The two men allegedly obtained access to the safe by plying Vicars with whiskey until he fell unconscious, at which point they removed the key from his pocket. Once the jewels had been extricated, Shackleton transported them to Amsterdam, where he sold them for £20,000. Hobson claimed that the men escaped prosecution due to Shackleton threatening to expose the "discreditable doings" of various high-ranking personages with whom he was acquainted. Hobson repeated the allegations in a formal statement to officials in 1955, and in his autobiography.

Officials were aware of the homosexuality of Shackleton, Gorges, and Vicars and the claim that the investigation was compromised to avoid a greater scandal, such as the Dublin Castle scandal of 1884, was also made by Vicars, including in his will. The Lord Lieutenant's son, Lord Haddo, had been a participant in the parties at the castle, and King Edward VII's allegedly bisexual brother-in-law the Duke of Argyll was known to Frank Shackleton, through a friendship with the prominent social figure Lord Ronald Gower.

Of the persons alleged to be involved in the theft:

- Sir Arthur Vicars was killed by the IRA in County Kerry in April 1921.
- Frank Shackleton defrauded Lord Ronald Gower of his fortune between 1910 and 1913. Shackleton was eventually prosecuted and imprisoned, but only for defrauding a spinster friend of Gower, even though it was for a far smaller sum. It has been surmised this legal oddity was due to the British Government's desire not to provoke Shackleton unduly, or probe Gower, over fear prominent names might be voiced. Upon release from prison, Shackleton changed his name to Mellor and became an antiques dealer in Chichester, England, until his death on 24 June 1941, aged 64.
- Richard Gorges shot and killed Detective Constable Arthur Young on 14 July 1915, and served 10 years of a 12-year sentence. In May 1941, Gorges was arrested and again sent to gaol for obtaining clothes from Simpsons of Piccadilly with a worthless cheque. In January 1944 he was killed after being run over by a train in the London Underground.

Only a short time after the theft, accusations began to be made, most especially by overseas press, that proper investigation of the theft was being suppressed by the British Government to protect prominent names. This led to such claims regularly being made in Parliament by Irish MPs for several years.

There was a theory that the jewels were stolen by political activists who were in the Irish Republican Brotherhood. In the House of Commons in August 1907, Pat O'Brien, MP, blamed "loyal and patriotic Unionist criminals". Lord Haddo was alleged by some newspapers to have been involved in the theft; Augustine Birrell, the Chief Secretary for Ireland, stated in the Commons that Haddo had been in Great Britain throughout the time period within which the theft took place. In 1912 and 1913, Laurence Ginnell suggested that the police investigation had established the identity of the thief, that his report had been suppressed to avoid scandal, and that the jewels were "at present within the reach of the Irish Government awaiting the invention of some plausible method of restoring them without getting entangled in the Criminal Law". In an adjournment debate in 1912 he alleged:

The proposition I ask to be allowed to make is this: The police charged with collecting evidence in connection with the disappearance of the Crown Jewels from Dublin Castle in 1907 collected evidence inseparable from it of criminal debauchery and sodomy being committed in the castle by officials, Army officers, and a couple of nondescripts of such position that their conviction and exposure would have led to an upheaval from which the Chief Secretary shrank. In order to prevent that he suspended the operation of the Criminal Law, and appointed a whitewashing commission with the result for which it was appointed.

His speech was curtailed when a quorum of forty MPs was not present in the chamber. He elaborated the following week on the alleged depravity of "two of the characters", namely army captain Richard Gorges ("a reckless bully, a robber, a murderer, a bugger, and a sod") and Shackleton ("One of [Gorges'] chums in the castle, and a participant in the debauchery"). Birrell denied any cover-up and urged Ginnell to give to the police any evidence he had relating to the theft or any sexual crime. Walter Vavasour Faber also asked about a cover-up; Edward Legge supported this theory.

On 23 November 1912, the London Mail alleged that Vicars had allowed a woman reported to be his mistress to obtain a copy of the key to the safe and that she had fled to Paris with the jewels. In July 1913, Vicars sued the paper for libel; it admitted that the story was completely baseless and that the woman in question did not exist; Vicars was awarded damages of £5,000. Vicars left nothing in his will to his half-brother Pierce O'Mahony, on the grounds that O'Mahony had repudiated a promise to recompense Vicars for the loss of income caused by his resignation.

After Frank Shackleton was imprisoned in 1914 for passing a cheque stolen from a spinster, Earl Winterton asked for the judicial inquiry demanded by Vicars.

A 1927 memo of the Executive Council of the Irish Free State, released in the 1970s, stated that W. T. Cosgrave "understands that the Castle jewels are for sale and that they could be got for £2,000 or £3,000." However, it has been suggested that this is a misunderstanding, the memorandum having resulted from a communication to Cosgrave from a Dublin jeweller, James Weldon, who had been theoretically offered the jewels by a man fitting the description of Frank Shackleton, but in 1908.

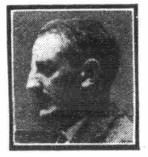
Captain Richard Howard Gorges at his trial 1915

In 1965, Vicious Circle: The Case of the Missing Irish Crown Jewels was published. While not ascribing definitive responsibility for the theft, it was the most detailed account to that date. In 2002, another published account, Scandal & Betrayal: Shackleton And The Irish Crown Jewels suggested the theft was a Unionist plot to embarrass the Liberal government. A reviewer called it "speculation and allegation dressed up as history". A 2003 study, The Stealing Of The Irish Crown Jewels, stated that while Shackleton and Gorges may have been shielded from prosecution due to fears they would expose homosexuality in prominent figures, this was only speculation, and the police may simply not have had enough evidence against them. In 2023, A Secret Between Gentlemen further detailed the British Government's suppression of the case, and its hesitancy in prosecuting Shackleton in 1913 over his defrauding of Gower's fortune. It served to strengthen Bulmer Hobson's allegation over the reason for the Government's behaviour in 1908.

Folklore within the Genealogical Office of the Republic of Ireland, the successor to the Office of Arms, was that the jewels were never removed from the Clock Tower, but were merely hidden. In 1983, when the Genealogical Office vacated its structurally unsound premises inside the Clock Tower, Donal Begley, the Chief Herald of Ireland, supervised the removal of walls and floorboards, in case the jewels were found, but they were not.

=== Fictional accounts ===
A 1967 book suggests that the 1908 Sherlock Holmes story "The Adventure of the Bruce-Partington Plans" was inspired by the theft; author Sir Arthur Conan Doyle was a friend of Vicars, and the fictional Valentine Walters, who steals the Plans but is caught by Holmes, has similarities with Francis Shackleton.

Jewels, a Bob Perrin novel based on the theft, was published in 1977.

The Case of the Crown Jewels by Donald Serrell Thomas, a Sherlock Holmes story based on the theft, was published in 1997.

"The Crown Jewel Affair", a short story by Michael Scott, appeared in the 2016 anthology Echoes of Sherlock Holmes, edited by Laurie R. King and Leslie S. Klinger.

Knave of Diamonds, a Mary Russell novel by Laurie R. King, published in 2025, deals with the theft.

== Bibliography ==
- Hood, Susan (2002). Royal Roots, Republican Inheritance: The Survival of the Office of Arms. Dublin: Woodfield Press in association with National Library of Ireland. ISBN 9780953429332.
- Statutes and Ordinances of the Most Illustrious Order of St. Patrick. Dublin: George & John Grierson for Her Majesty's Stationery Office. 1852.
- Legge, Edward (1913). More about King Edward. Boston: Small, Maynard.
- Viceregal Commission to investigate the circumstances of the loss of the regalia of the Order of Saint Patrick (1908). Report. Command papers. Vol. Cd.3906. HMSO – via Internet Archive.
- Viceregal Commission to investigate the circumstances of the loss of the regalia of the Order of Saint Patrick (1908). Appendix. Command papers. Vol. Cd.3936. HMSO – via Internet Archive.
