= Francis Stoughton Sullivan =

Irish lawyer and professor

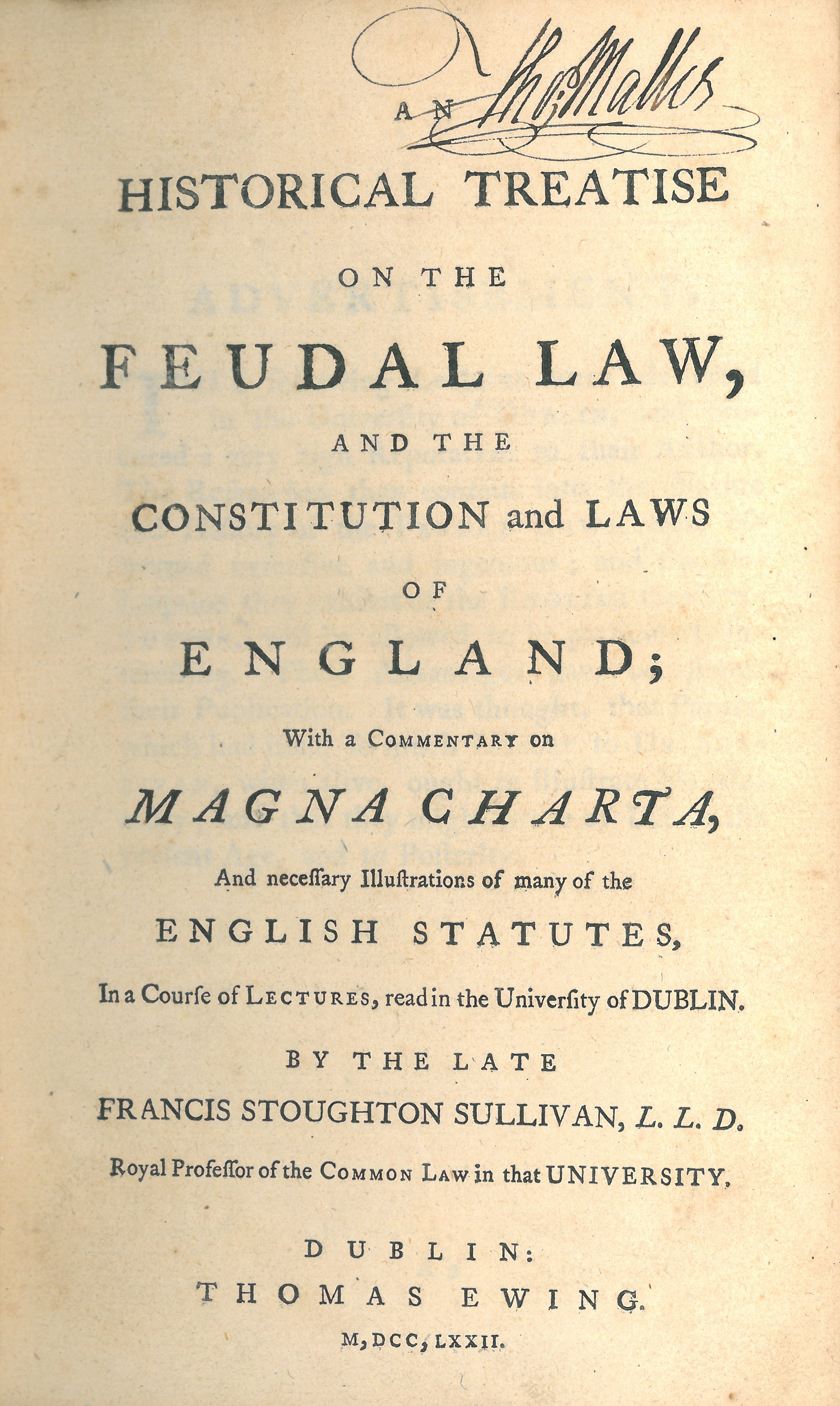
The title page of the first Irish edition of Sullivan's work An Historical Treatise on the Feudal Law, and the Constitution and Laws of England (1772)

Francis Stoughton Sullivan (1715–1766) was an Irish lawyer, and Professor of Oratory and law professor at Trinity College Dublin.

Sullivan, a member of the Kerry O'Sullivan More family, was born in Galway and educated at Trinity College Dublin, graduating with a Doctor of Laws (LL.D.) in 1745. He was called to the Bar the following year. In 1750 he was appointed Professor of Laws in Trinity, in 1759 Professor of Oratory, and three years later the first Regius Professor of Feudal and English Law. He was especially noted for excellence in the latter fields, and lectures he gave at the university, including commentaries on Magna Carta, were posthumously published in a volume called An Historical Treatise on the Feudal Law, and the Constitution and Laws of England (1772).

Sullivan also had a great interest in Irish history and Irish manuscripts all his life, and employed native scribes in preparing editions of Lebor Gabála Érenn (The Book of the Taking of Ireland) and the Annals of the Four Masters which never saw print. He died in Dublin on 1 March 1766. His son, William Francis Sullivan (1756–1830) served in the United States Navy, and published plays and poems.

== Bibliography ==
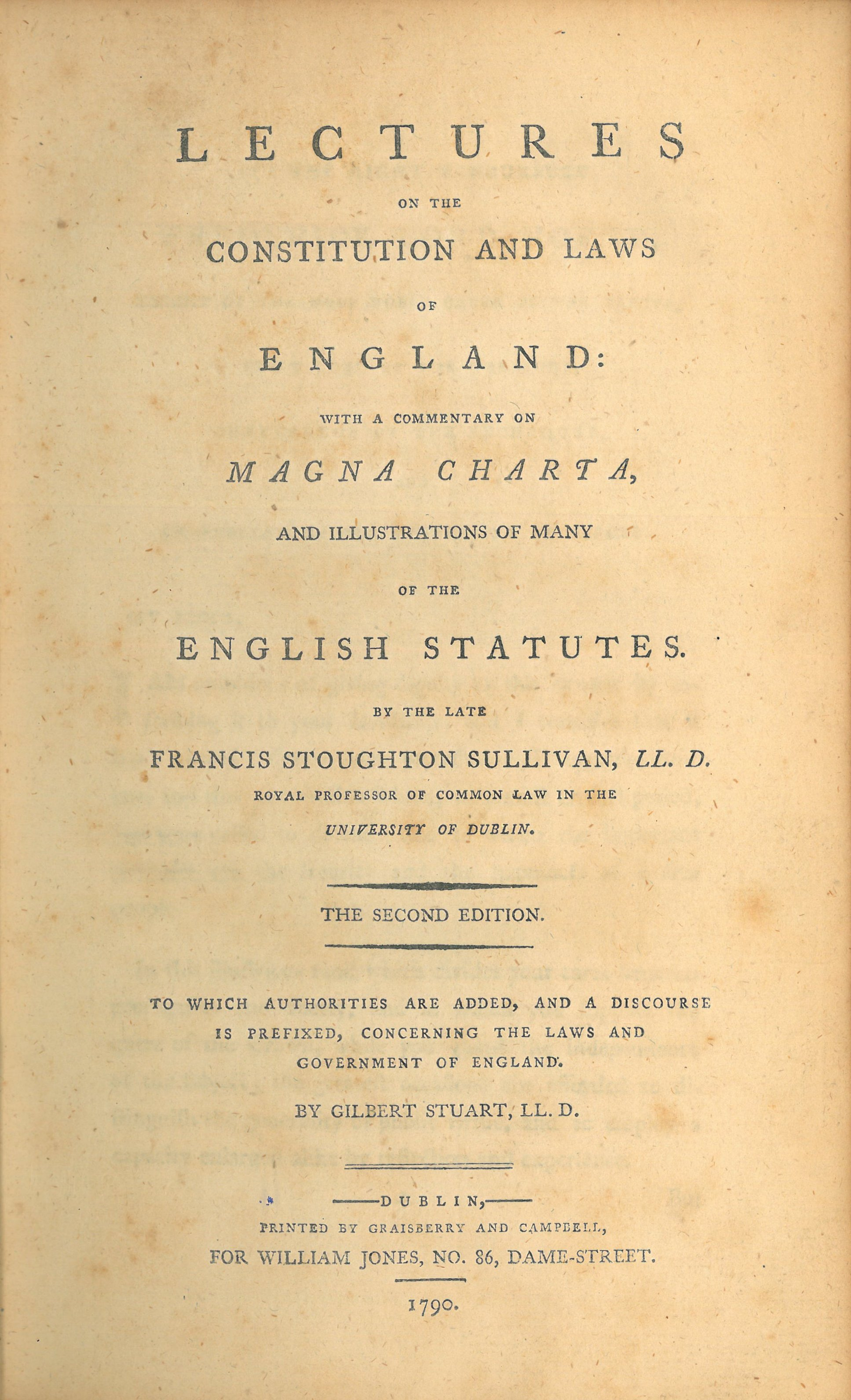
The title page of the second Irish edition of Sullivan's Lectures on the Constitution and Laws of England (1790), published in Dublin

- An Historical Treatise on the Feudal Law, and the Constitution and Laws of England: With a Commentary on Magna Charta, and Necessary Illustrations of many of the English Statutes, in a Course of Lectures, Read in the University of Dublin. By the Late Francis Stoughton Sullivan, LL.D. Royal Professor of the Common Law in that University (1st Irish ed.), Dublin: Thomas Ewing, 1772, OCLC 776548497.
- An Historical Treatise on the Feudal Law, and the Constitution and Laws of England: With a Commentary on Magna Charta, and Necessary Illustrations of many of the English Statutes: In a Course of Lectures Read in the University of Dublin (1st English ed.), London: J[oseph] Johnson and J. Payne, 1772, OCLC 76925321.
- Lectures on the Constitution and Laws of England: With a Commentary on Magna Charta, and Illustrations of Many of the English Statutes. By the Late Francis Stoughton Sullivan, LL.D. Royal Professor of Common Law in the University of Dublin. The Second Edition. To which Authorities are Added, and a Discourse is Prefixed, Concerning the Laws and Government of England. By Gilbert Stuart, LL.D. (2nd English ed.), London: Printed for Edward and Charles Dilly in the Poultry; and Joseph Johnson in St. Paul's Church-yard, 1776, OCLC 173651650.
- Lectures on the Constitution and Laws of England: With a Commentary on Magna Charta, and Illustrations of Many of the English Statutes. By the Late Francis Stoughton Sullivan, LL.D. Royal Professor of Common Law in the University of Dublin. The Second Edition. To which Authorities are Added, and a Discourse is Prefixed, Concerning the Laws and Government of England. By Gilbert Stuart, LL.D. (2nd Irish ed.), Dublin: Printed by Graisberry and Campbell, for William Jones, No. 86, Dame-Street, 1790, OCLC 642108490.
