= James Johnston Shaw =

Irish economist and judge

James Johnston Shaw (4 January 1845 – 27 April 1910) was an Irish county court judge.

== Early life ==
He was born at Kircubbin, County Down, Ireland on 4 January 1845, the second son among seven children of John Maxwell Shaw (died 1852), a merchant and farmer at Kircubbin, by his wife Anne, daughter of Adam Johnston. Shaw was first taught in a local national school, and later by James Rowan, Presbyterian minister of Kircubbin. In 1858 he was sent to the Belfast Academy, where he became a favourite pupil of the principal, Rev. Reuben John Bryce, LL.D. (uncle of James Bryce, 1st Viscount Bryce). In 1861 he entered Queen's College, Belfast, gaining the highest entrance scholarship in classics, the first of many honours. Diverging to the study of mental science and political economy, he graduated B.A. in 1865 and M.A. in 1866 in the Queen's University of Ireland with first-class honours in those subjects. In 1882 he received the honorary degree of LL.D. from his university.

== Academic and professional career ==
After studying theology in the General Assembly's College, Belfast, and at the University of Edinburgh, he was licensed to preach in 1869 by the Presbytery of Ards, and was appointed in the same year by the General Assembly Professor of Metaphysics and Ethics in Magee College, Derry.

In 1878, he resigned this chair and was called to the Irish Bar, where he rapidly attained success. Meanwhile in 1876 he was elected Whately Professor of Political Economy in Trinity College, Dublin. Several papers on economic subjects which he read before the Statistical and Social Inquiry Society of Ireland, the British Association, the Social Science Congress, and elsewhere, were published and attracted attention. He became president of the Statistical Society in 1901.

In 1886, he was made a member of the Senate of the Royal University of Ireland, and in 1891 a Commissioner of National Education. In the last year, however, he became County Court Judge of County Kerry. The work of the new office proved congenial and afforded leisure to apply to other work.

In 1902, he joined the council of trustees of the National Library of Ireland, and in 1908 was chairman of a viceregal commission of inquiry into the mysterious disappearance of the Irish Crown Jewels from Dublin Castle. When the Queen's University of Belfast was founded by royal charter in 1908, he was appointed by the Crown chairman of the commission charged with the framing of the statutes, and he discharged the duties of this office with marked ability.

He was also a member of the governing body of the University, and in 1909 pro-chancellor in succession to Sir Donald Currie.

== Death ==
In 1909, he was created Recorder of Belfast, and County Court Judge of County Antrim. A singularly clear thinker and writer, and a high-principled administrator, Shaw died in Dublin on 27 April 1910, and was buried in the Mount Jerome Cemetery there.

In 1911, his portrait by Sydney Rowley was placed in the hall of the Queen's University of Belfast, together with a memorial brass; a Shaw prize in economics was also founded in his memory.

== Personal life ==
Shaw married in 1870 Mary Elizabeth (d. 1908), daughter of William Maxwell of Ballyherly, Portaferry, County Down, by whom he had one daughter, Margaret (who married Robert H. Woods, president of the Royal College of Surgeons in Ireland, 1910–11 and MP for Dublin University, 1918–22), and two sons.

== Works ==
Shaw translated the Enchiridion in 1873, for an edition of the works of Augustine edited by Dr. Marcus Dods. After his death his daughter, Mrs. Woods, collected and edited, with a biographical sketch, a number of his papers on economic and other subjects under the title 'Occasional Papers' (Dublin, 1910). It was reviewed unfavourably in The Irish Review.

== Sources ==
- Personal knowledge of Thomas Hamilton (university administrator).
- Address by Right Hon. Christopher Palles at unveiling of memorial tablet in Belfast University, 1911.
- Biographical sketch by Mrs. Woods, referred to above.

== Notes ==
Academic offices
Preceded by John Park	Professor of Metaphysics and Ethics at Magee College, Derry, County Londonderry; 1869-78	Succeeded by Rev. Hugh C. Graham
Preceded by Robert Cather Donnell	Whately Professor of Political Economy at Trinity College, Dublin; 1876-82	Succeeded by Charles Francis Bastable

This article incorporates text from a publication now in the public domain: Hamilton, Thomas (1912). "James Johnston Shaw". In Lee, Sidney (ed.). Dictionary of National Biography (2nd supplement). Vol. 3. London: Smith, Elder & Co.
