= Arthur Vicars =

Ulster King of Arms (1862–1921)

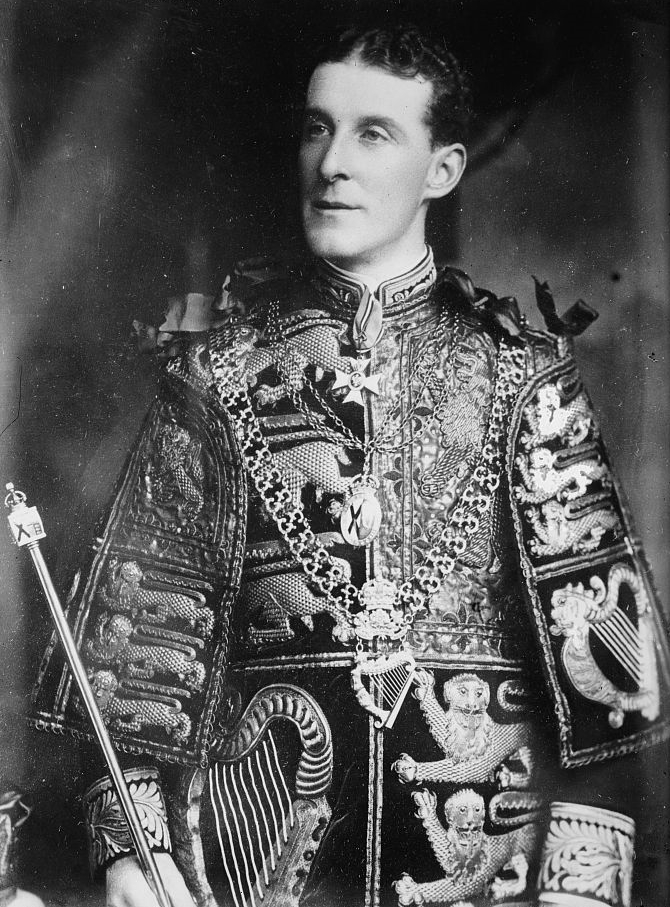
Sir Arthur Vicars

Sir Arthur Edward Vicars, KCVO (27 July 1862 – 14 April 1921), was a genealogist and heraldic expert. He was appointed Ulster King of Arms in 1893, but was removed from the post in 1908 following the theft of the Irish Crown Jewels in the previous year. He was murdered by the IRA in 1921 during the Irish War of Independence.

== Antiquarian and expert in heraldry ==
Vicars was born on 27 July 1862 in Leamington Spa, Warwickshire, and was the youngest child of Colonel William Henry Vicars of the 61st Regiment of Foot and his wife Jane (originally Gun-Cunninghame). This was his mother's second marriage, the first being to Pierce O'Mahony by whom she had two sons. Arthur was very attached to his Irish half-brothers and spent much time at their residences. On completing his education at Magdalen College School, Oxford and Bromsgrove School he moved permanently to Ireland.

He quickly developed an expertise in genealogical and heraldic matters and made several attempts to be employed by the Irish heraldic administration of Ulster King of Arms, even offering to work for no pay. In 1891, he was one of the founder members of the County Kildare Archaeological Society, and remained its honorary secretary until his death.

He first attempted to find a post in the Office of Arms when, in 1892, he applied unsuccessfully for the post of Athlone Pursuivant on the death of the incumbent, Bernard Louis Burke. In a letter dated 2 October 1892 Vicars's half-brother Peirce Mahony wrote that Sir Bernard Burke, Ulster King of Arms, was dying and urged him: "You should move at once."

Burke died in December 1892, and Vicars was appointed to the office by letters patent dated 2 February 1893. In 1896 Arthur Vicars was knighted, in 1900 he was appointed Commander of the Royal Victorian Order (CVO) and in 1903 he was elevated to Knight Commander of the order (KCVO).

He was a fellow of the Society of Antiquaries and a trustee of the National Library of Ireland.

In 1897, Vicars published An Index to the Prerogative Wills of Ireland 1536 -1810, a listing of all persons in wills proved in that period. This work became very valuable to genealogists after the destruction of the source material for the book in 1922 when the Public Record Office at the Four Courts was destroyed at the start of the Irish Civil War.

== Theft of the Irish Crown Jewels ==
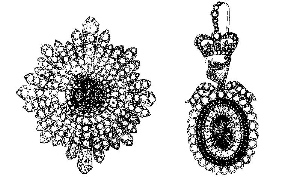
The Irish Crown Jewels. This image was published by the Royal Irish Constabulary and the Dublin Metropolitan Police twice a week after the theft of the jewels was discovered.

Vicars' career was very distinguished until 1907 when it was hit by the scandal of the theft of the Irish Crown Jewels. As Registrar of the Order of St Patrick, Vicars had custody of the insignia of the order, also known as the "crown jewels". They were found to be missing on 6 July, and a Crown Jewel Commission under Judge James Johnston Shaw was established in January 1908 to investigate the disappearance. Vicars and his barrister Tim Healy refused to attend the commission's hearings. The commission's findings were published on 25 January 1908. Vicars was replaced as Ulster five days later.

On 23 November 1912, the Daily Mail published serious false allegations against Vicars. The substance of the article was that Vicars had allowed a woman reported to be his mistress to obtain a copy to the key to the safe and that she had fled to Paris with the jewels. In July 1913, Vicars successfully sued the paper for libel; the paper admitted that the story was completely baseless and that the woman in question did not exist. Vicars was awarded damages of £5,000.

Vicars left Dublin and moved to Kilmorna, near Listowel, County Kerry, the former seat of one of his half-brothers. He married Gertrude Wright in Ballymore, County Wicklow on 4 July 1917. He continued to protest his innocence until his death, even including bitter references to the affair in his will.

== Death ==
In May 1920 up to a hundred armed men broke into Kilmorna House and held Vicars at gunpoint while they attempted to break into the house's strongroom. On 14 April 1921, he was taken from Kilmorna House, which was set alight, and shot dead in front of his wife. According to the communiqué issued from Dublin Castle, thirty armed men took him from his bed and shot him, leaving a placard around his neck denouncing him as an informer. On 27 April, as an official reprisal, four shops were destroyed by Crown Forces in the town of Listowel. The proclamation given under Martial law and ordering their demolition also stated:

For any outrage carried out in future against the lives or property of loyalist officials, reprisals will be taken against selected persons known to have rebel sympathies, although their implication has not been proved.

Vicars was buried in Leckhampton, Gloucestershire on 20 April. His wife died in Somerset in 1946.

== Armorial bearings ==
Coat of arms of Sir Arthur Vicars KCVO as Ulster King of Arms
| Notes Arms of Sir Arthur Vicars KCVO as Ulster King of Arms with crest and motto, taken from Sir Arthur's bookplate as drawn by C.W. Sherborn and illustrated in Fox-Davies's Armorial Families (5th ed.) of 1905 Adopted 1893 (confirmation) Coronet Coronet of a king of arms Crest Upon a wreath of the colours a dove holding in its bill an olive branch all proper Helm Knight's helm Escutcheon Argent, on a cross sable, five estoiles of the field impaled by the arms of the Ulster King of Arms, namely or, a cross gules and on a chief of the last, a lion passant guardant between a harp and portcullis all of the field Motto Vincit omnia virtus Previous versions Subsequent to his appointment as Ulster King of Arms, a confirmation of the arms as detailed here was made on 11 November 1893 to descendants of Sir Arthur's great grandfather, Richard Vicars of Levally, Queen's County; this grant specifies the Vicars arms here impaled by the arms of the Ulster King of Arms. These arms are stated to have "been for many generations borne by his family" (Irish grants: H236) |

== Sources ==
- Royal Roots, Republican Inheritance, The Survival of the Office of Arms, Susan Hood, Dublin 2002

Heraldic offices
| Preceded by Sir John Bernard Burke | Ulster King of Arms; 1893–1908 | Succeeded by Sir Neville Rodwell Wilkinson |
