= Robert Shawe =

Robert Shawe (circa 1699 to 1752) was an Irish academic who spent his final years as a clergyman. He was Donegall Lecturer of maths at Trinity College Dublin (TCD) from 1734 to 1735.

== Life and career ==
Shawe was born near Athenry, in county Galway, Ireland. He attended TCD, being elected a scholar in 1717. He graduated BA in 1719, obtained MA in 1722, and was elected a Fellow the same year (replacing Richard Helsham). He was Professor of Oratory and History (1732-1738). In 1734, he was awarded DD and became Donegall Lecturer of Mathematics for a year, also serving as vice-provost (1734-1744). He was appointed Regius Professor of Laws (1740-1743). In 1743 he became the rector of Ardstraw, in County Tyrone.
