= J. H. B. Bell =

British mountain climber

James Horst Brunnerman Bell (1896–1975) was a leading Scots mountaineer in the period prior to World War II, going on to edit the SMC Journal for an unequalled 24 years from 1936 to 1959. He put up many serious routes on Ben Nevis and in many other areas of Scotland. One of his first ascents was "Long Climb" (Bell & J. D. B. Wilson, June 1940), a 1,400-foot (430 m) Severe on the Orion Face of Ben Nevis—it is reputedly the longest in the UK and a chapter by Malcolm Slesser is devoted to it in the compendium of classic UK rock climbs Classic Rock.

The aphorism "Any fool can climb good rock, but it takes craft and cunning to get up vegetatious schist or granite" has been attributed to him by several authors, including W. H. Murray and Hamish Brown (in his introduction to Bell's Scottish Climbs).

He tutored, among others, the younger W. H. Murray and inspired many others. The words which he wrote in Progress in Mountaineering—"the head of the Fionn Loch would be a veritable paradise for the enthusiastic rock-climber, for I do not know any other corner in the Scottish Highlands with so much opportunity for exploration in grand and imposing surroundings. It was the grandeur and beauty of the scene which held me spellbound"—led indirectly to the development of climbing on Carnmore crag in the Fisherfield Forest by inspiring a young Mike O'Hara to visit and establish a string of first ascents there.

Bell trained as an industrial chemist (DSc, Edinburgh, 1932), and so (according to Murray) regarded food only as "fuel", mixing many courses together when preparing for a day on the hill.

Bell was always keen to train others, and did several of his new routes with women climbers, including his wife Pat. He published A Progress in Mountaineering in 1950 which was partially reissued as Bell's Scottish Climbs in 1988, both are still well regarded.

Bell also revised the guidebook for the Island of Skye (originally produced by Steeple, Barlow & MacRobert in 1931) in 1954 and contributed the Scottish section for the book British Hills & Mountains.
