= Paul O'Higgins =

Irish legal scholar (1927–2008)

Paul O'Higgins (5 October 1927 – 13 March 2008) was a noted Irish scholar of human rights and labour law. The Times credits O'Higgins as "one of the founding fathers of the academic study of labour law and social security law" in Britain. According to Professor Keith Ewing, O'Higgins "was at the forefront of an innovation in legal teaching and scholarship, which encouraged lawyers to appreciate how law worked in practice, and to reflect on the social context of the legal rules they examined." According to Professor Suttvinder Juss, O'Higgins was "a mentor of unfathomable talent and achievements, who left his mark on all who came under his guidance."

O'Higgins was educated at Coláiste Iognáid in Galway. He studied medicine at Trinity College Dublin, but later switched to law, being called to the bars in both England and Ireland, and completing a PhD at the University of Cambridge. O'Higgins' PhD thesis has been described as "one of the most exceptional works in English legal literature". In 1959, O'Higgins became a fellow of Christ's College, Cambridge and subsequently a lecturer, teaching constitutional law, administrative law, civil liberties and public international law. When promoted to Reader, O'Higgins chose to take the title of "Reader in Labour Law", to signify the special relevance of the subject.

In 1970, O'Higgins was denied the prestigious Regius Professor Chair at Trinity College Dublin, due to his left-wing views and past opposition to flying the Union Jack. However, he was eventually appointed to the position, in 1984. In 1987, King's College London appointed O'Higgins as a chair professor, which he held for five years until his retirement. O'Higgins later returned to Cambridge, where he served as Vice-Master of Christ's College.

Apart from significant contributions to the field of labour law, O'Higgins wrote an important book on freedom of speech, Censorship in Britain, published in 1972.
