= Andrew Searle Hart =

Anglo-Irish mathematician and Vice-Provost of Trinity College Dublin

Sir Andrew Searle Hart
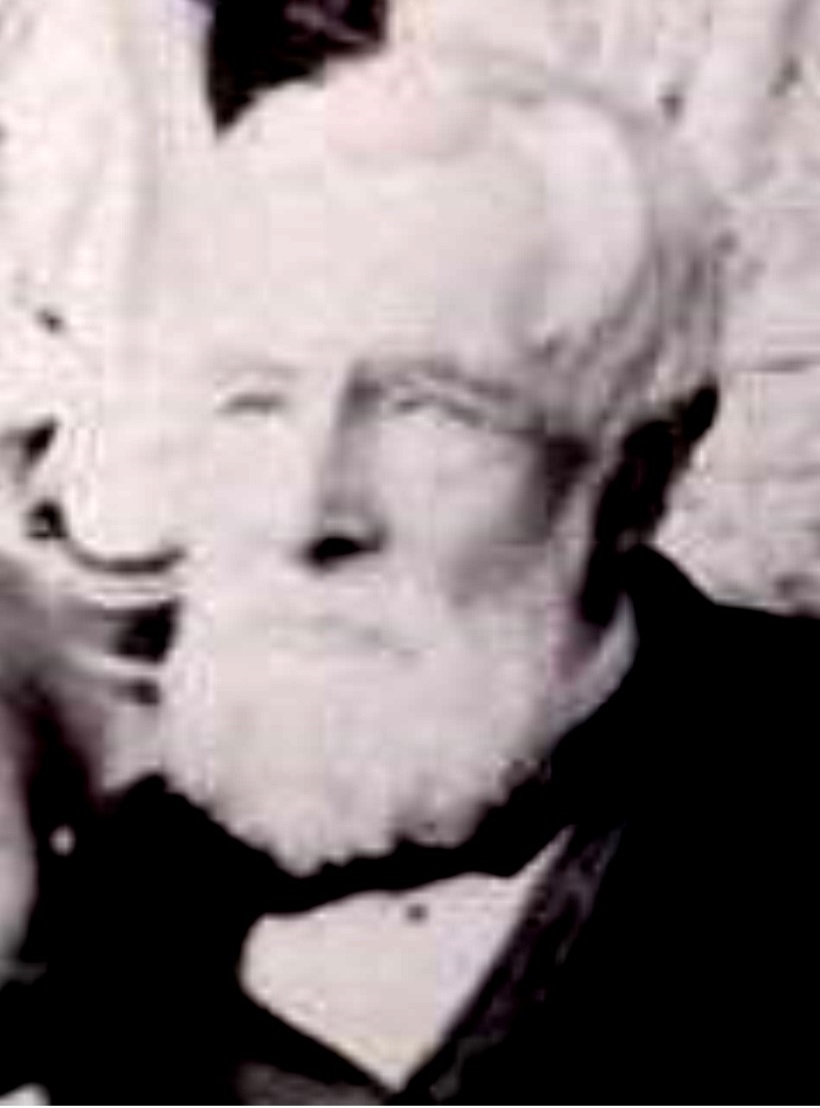
- Born: 14 March 1811; Limerick, Ireland
- Died: 13 April 1890 (aged 79); Kilderry House, County Donegal, Ireland
- Occupation: Mathematician and Vice-Provost of Trinity College, Dublin

Sir Andrew Searle Hart (1811–1890) was an Anglo-Irish mathematician and Vice-Provost of Trinity College Dublin (TCD).

== Early life and background ==
He was the youngest son of the Rev. George Vaughan Hart of Glenalla, County Donegal, and his wife Maria Murray, daughter of the Very Rev. John Hume, dean of Derry, and was born at Limerick on 14 March 1811. His grandfather, Lieutenant John Hart, a younger son of the family, was killed in action at the Battle of the Monongahela.

His father took possession of the Glenalla and Carrablagh estates from the Murrays, to whom his wife was related.

He was a descendant of Henry Hart, who came to Ireland with the army of Elizabeth I. Another relation, Sir Eustace Hart, married Lady Mary de Vere, a daughter of John de Vere, 16th Earl of Oxford and a sister of the 17th Earl of Oxford, who is a proposed alternative to the authorship of the works by William Shakespeare.

His mother, Maria Murray Hume, was from the same family as the philosopher David Hume. Sir Andrew's first cousin once removed was James Deacon Hume, the 18th-century economist and civil servant. On the Murray side, Hart was a direct descendant of the Murrays of Cockpool and of Sir William Murray, who married Isabel Randolph, a sister of Thomas Randolph, 1st Earl of Moray and a niece of Robert the Bruce.

He was educated at Foyle College and by a private tutor before entering TCD in 1828, where he became the class-fellow and intimate friend of Isaac Butt, with whom he always preserved a warm friendship although they differed in politics. Hart graduated BA 1833, proceeded MA 1839, and LL.B. and LL.D. 1840. He was elected a fellow on 15 June 1835. From 1847 to 1858 he was the Donegall Lecturer in Mathematics at TCD.

== Academic career ==
Hart obtained much reputation as a mathematician, and published useful treatises on hydrostatics and mechanics. Between 1849 and 1861 he contributed valuable papers to the Cambridge and Dublin Mathematical Journal, to the 'Proceedings of the Irish Academy,' and to the Quarterly Journal of Mathematics, chiefly on the subject of geodesic lines and on curves.

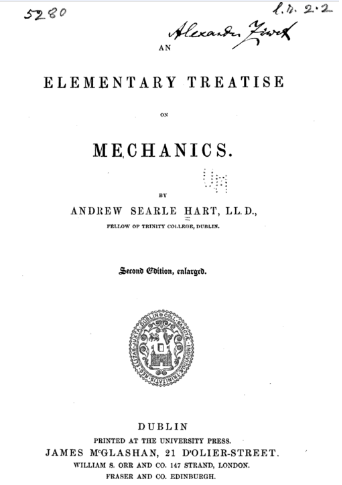

Hart also served as Professor of Real and Personal Property in King's Inns, Dublin.

=== Hart's Theorem ===
Hart's most important contribution was contained in his paper Extension of Terquem's theorem respecting the circle which bisects three sides of a triangle (1861). Hart wrote this paper after carrying out an investigation suggested by William Rowan Hamilton in a letter to Hart. In addition, Hart corresponded with George Salmon on the same topic. This paper contains the result which became known as Hart's Theorem, which is a generalisation of Feuerbach's Theorem. Hart's Theorem states:

Taking any three of the eight circles which touch three others, a circle can be described to touch these three, and to touch a fourth circle of the eight touching circles.

In Principles of geometry (1925), Henry Baker sums up Hart's Theorem as follows:

Given three lines in a plane, there are four circles touching them; these circles, we know, are all touched by another circle, the nine-points circle (Feuerbach's theorem; see Vol. II). In other words, given three lines, we can add to them a circle such that the four, these lines and the circle, are all touched by four other circles. In the present chapter we show how, given any three circles in a plane, we can add to them another circle, which we call the Hart circle, such that the four circles are all touched by four other circles (Hart, 'Quart. J. of Math.', IV (1861), p. 260). The three original circles are in fact touched by eight other circles, as we shall prove. There are fourteen ways of choosing, from these eight, four circles which touch another circle. In six of these ways, the four circles chosen have a common orthogonal circle; and the four circles consisting of the original circles, and their Hart circle, have also a common orthogonal circle. We have shown that circles in a plane may be regarded as projections of plane sections of a quadric. We prove the results enunciated as theorems for such plane sections. This appears greatly to increase the interest and clearness of the matter.

Hart was co-opted as a Senior Fellow of TCD on 10 July 1858.

In February 1873, Hart made up part of the delegation sent to London on behalf of TCD to lobby members of parliament to vote against the Irish University Bill

He was elected Vice-Provost of TCD in 1876, and at this time undertook many of the duties of the then provost, Humphrey Lloyd, that ill health had permitted him from carrying out.

== Personal life ==
He married in 1840 Frances, daughter of Sir Henry McDougall, Q.C., of Dublin; she died in 1876. Two sons, George Vaughan Hart (1841-1912), a barrister, and Henry Chichester Hart (1847-1908), a botanist and explorer, of Carrablagh House, Donegal, survived him. The youngest son, William Hume Hart (1852-1887) predeceased Sir Andrew.

Sir Andrew Hart took an active interest in the affairs of the Irish Church, and was for many years a member of the general synod and representative church body.

On 25 January 1886, he was knighted at Dublin Castle by the lord-lieutenant, Lord Carnarvon, "in recognition of his academic rank and attainments."

Sir Andrew Hart died suddenly at the house of his brother-in-law and cousin, George Vaughan Hart, of Kilderry, County Donegal, on 13 April 1890.

== Photograph ==
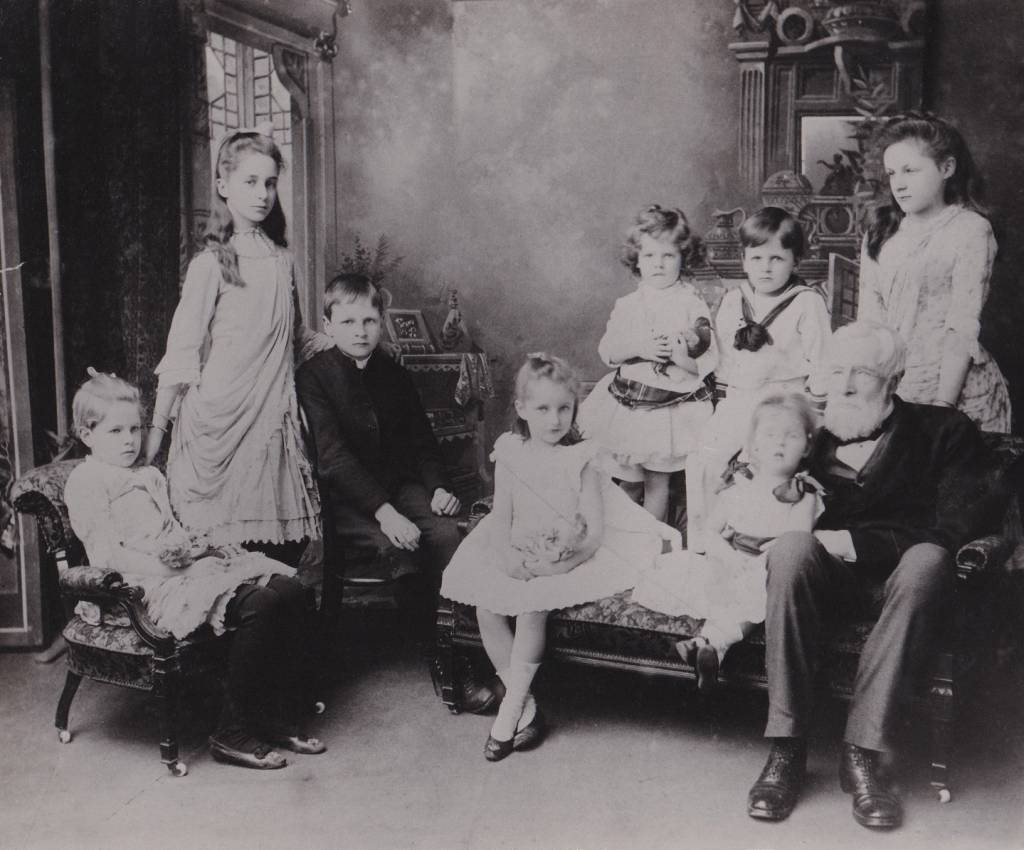
Sir Andrew Hart with his eight grandchildren, Dublin, 1888

Left to right: Norah Searle Hart (1879-1965), Adelaide (Ada) Hart (1876-197?), George Vaughan (Vaughan) Hart (1877-1928), Hilda Chichester Hart (1882-1967), Tristram Beresford Hart (1884-1963), Ruth Hart (1886-1977), Sir Andrew Searle Hart, Ethel Hart (1875-1964). All the minors shown except Ada were children of George Vaughan Hart. Ada was the daughter of William Hume Hart.

== Ancestry ==
Ancestors of Andrew Searle Hart

16. Captain Henry Hart (grandson of Captain Henry Hart)
8. Colonel George Hart
17. Anne Beresford (daughter of Sir Tristram Beresford, 1st Baronet and Sarah Sackville)
4. John Hart
18. George Vaughan of Buncrana Castle
9. Marianna Vaughan
2. Rev. George Vaughan Ledwich Hart
20. John Barnard
10. Nathaniel Barnard (brother of Rt. Rev William Barnard, the Bishop of Derry)
21. Isabella ?
5. Catherine Barnard
1. Sir Andrew Searle Hart
24. Rev. William Hume (scion of Home of Blackadder)
12. Dr James Hume (brother of John Hume (bishop))
25. Jane Robertson
6. Very Rev. John Hume
26. Nathaniel Rokeby
13. Elizabeth Rokeby
27. Elizabeth ?
3. Maria Murray Hume
28. John Murray (son of George Murray of Broughton)
14. Captain James Murray
29. Bathia Freeman
7. Jane Murray (sister of Brig-Gen. John Murray)
15. Nikola Anna Johnstone

== Publications ==
1. 'An Elementary Treatise on Mechanics,' 1844; 2nd edit. 1847.
2. 'On the Form of Geodesic Lines through the Umbilic of an Ellipsoid, Proceedings of the Royal Irish Academy 4 (1847-1850), 274,' 1849.
3. 'Geometrical demonstration of some properties of geodesic lines, Cambridge and Dublin Mathematical Journal 4 (1849), 80–84.'
4. 'On geodesic lines traced on a surface of the second degree, Cambridge and Dublin Mathematical Journal 4 (1849), 192–194.'
5. 'An Elementary Treatise on Hydrostatics and Hydrodynamics,' 1846; another edit. 1850.
6. 'An account of some transformations of curves, Cambridge and Dublin Mathematical Journal 8 (1853), 47–50.'
7. 'On the porism of the in-and-circumscribed triangle, Quarterly Journal of Pure and Applied Mathematics 2 (1858), 143.'
8. 'Extension of Terquem's theorem respecting the circle which bisects three sides of a triangle, Quarterly Journal of Pure and Applied Mathematics 4 (1861), 260–261.'
9. 'On Nine-Point Contact of Cubic Curves, The Transactions of the Royal Irish Academy 25, Science (1875), 559–565.'
10. 'On the Intersections of Plane Curves of the Third Order, The Transactions of the Royal Irish Academy 26, Science (1879), 449–452.'
11. 'On Twisted Quartics, Hermathena 5 (10) (1884), 164–170.'
12. 'On the Linear Relations between the Nine Points of Intersection of a System of Plane Cubic Curves, Hermathena 6 (13) (1887), 286–289.'
