= George O'Brien (Irish politician) =

Irish politician, economist and academic (1892–1973)

Senator
- In office 21 April 1948 – 23 June 1965
- Constituency: National University

Personal details
- Born: 26 January 1892 Dublin, Ireland
- Died: 31 December 1973 (aged 81) Dublin, Ireland
- Party: Independent
- Education: University College Dublin; King's Inns

George Augustine Thomas O'Brien (26 January 1892 – 31 December 1973) was an Irish politician, economist and academic.

He was elected to Seanad Éireann as an independent member in 1948 by the National University constituency. He was re-elected in 1951, 1954, 1957 and 1961. He lost his seat at the 1965 election.

He was educated at the Catholic University School, St George's College, Belvedere College, University College Dublin, and King's Inns.

He was Professor of National Economics and later Political Economy at University College Dublin from 1921 to 1961. He was president of the Statistical and Social Inquiry Society of Ireland between 1942 and 1946. In the 1950s he was appointed to the board of the Guinness Brewery, then one of Ireland's largest companies, and was thanked for assisting the authors of its first history. In the 1960s he was one of the first chairmen of the Economic and Social Research Institute.

== Publications ==
- The Economic History of Ireland in the Eighteenth Century (3 Vols.) (1918–1921)
- Essay on Medieval Economic Teaching, Longmans (1920)
- Labour Organisation (1921)
- An Essay on the Economic Effects of the Reformation (1923)
- Agricultural Economics (1929)
- The Four Green Fields, Talbot (1936)
- The Phantom of Plenty (1948)
