= Mountifort Longfield =

Irish lawyer, judge, mathematician, and academic

- Born: 1802
- Died: 21 November 1884; 47 Fitzwilliam Square, Dublin
- Education: Trinity College Dublin; M.A. in 1829 & LL.D. in 1831
- Alma mater: Trinity College, Dublin
- Occupation(s): judge, mathematician, and academic
- Employer(s): Trinity College, Dublin
- Known for: the first Professor of Political Economy at TCD
- Notable work: Four Lectures on Poor Laws; Lectures on Political Economy
- Spouse: Elizabeth Penelope
- Parent(s): Mountifort Longfield (father); Grace Lysaght (mother)

Samuel Mountifort Longfield (1802 – 21 November 1884) was an Irish lawyer, judge, mathematician, and academic. He was the first Professor of Political Economy at Trinity College, Dublin.

== Life ==
He was son of Mountifort Longfield, vicar of Desert Serges (Desert Magee), County Cork, and his wife Grace, daughter of William Lysaght of Fort William and Mount North, County Cork. He was educated at Trinity College Dublin, graduated as moderator and gold medallist in science in 1823, became a fellow in 1825, and proceeded to the degrees of M.A. in 1829 and LL.D. in 1831.

In 1828 Longfield was called to the Irish bar, but did not practise. When the professorship of political economy in Trinity College was founded in 1832, he was appointed the first professor; and in 1834 he resigned his fellowship and became Regius Professor of Feudal and English Law there, a post he held for the rest of his life, from 1871 having as deputy N. Ritchie, Q.C.

Longfield was reputed as a real property lawyer. In 1842 he became a Queen's Counsel, and in 1859 a bencher of the King's Inns. On the passing of the Incumbered Estates Act in 1849 he was appointed one of the three commissioners for it, holding office until the landed estates court was constituted in 1858. He became a judge of the court, and continued to sit until 1867.

A liberal in politics, Longfield helped draft the Irish measures of the first and second Gladstone administrations. In 1867 he was sworn a member of the Irish Privy Council. He was appointed a commissioner of Irish national education in 1853, and on several occasions was an assessor to the general synod of the Church of Ireland; with Joseph Galbraith he was one of the architects of the church's finances.

Longfield was an active member of the Social Science Congress and the Dublin Statistical Society. He died at 47 Fitzwilliam Square, Dublin, on 21 November 1884.

== Economist ==
His most important work in economics was "Lectures on Political Economy", which was published in 1834. He argued against the labor theory of value and developed a marginal revenue productivity theory of labour and capital. It was unusual for its time and was only rediscovered after 1900; some of his ideas on capital and interest foreshadowed the work of the Austrian School.

His main approaches revolved around the labor theory of value, an analysis of capital and distribution theory (based on a concept of marginal productivity). He applies insofar as the representative of the marginal utility theory avant la lettre.

== Works ==
- Four Lectures on Poor Laws, 1834.
- Lectures on Political Economy, delivered in Trinity and Michaelmas Terms, 1834. Dublin: William Curry, Jun. and Company. 1834. ISBN 1409959198 – via Internet Archives.
- Three Lectures on Commerce and One on Absenteeism, 1835
- An Elementary Treatise on Series, published by Hodges, Foster & Figgis, Dublin, 1872

== Family ==
In 1845 Longfield married Elizabeth Penelope, daughter of Andrew Armstrong.
