= John Anster =

Irish lawyer, academic and author

John Anster (1793– 9 June 1867 age 73–74) was an Irish professor and poet. He was Regius Professor of civil law at Trinity College Dublin.

== Life ==
Anster was born in Charleville, County Cork, and educated at Trinity College Dublin from 1814. He converted from Catholicism to the Church of Ireland and was admitted to the bar in 1824. He contributed prose essays in the North British Review and 28 poems to the Amulet in 1826. Eventually he became Regius Professor of Civil Law at Trinity College Dublin, having held office as registrar of the Admiralty Court, from 1837.

In Blackwood's Magazine for June, 1820, Anster published fragments of a translation of Goethe's Faust, and reprinted in England and America. He published the first part in 1835 as Faust: A Dramatic Mystery. The second part appeared in 1864.

He was a contributor to the Dublin University Magazine between the years 1837–56.

== Works ==
- Ode to Fancy, with Other Poems (Dublin: Milliken 1815)
- Lines on the Death of Her Royal Highness the Princess Charlotte of Wales (Dublin: R. Milliken; London: Longman 1818)
- Poems with Some Translations from the German (Dublin: R. Milliken; London: Cadell & Davies; Edinburgh: Blackwood 1819)
- Goethe's Faust (1820)
- Xeniola (1824)
- Faust (London: Harrap 1925)
- Faustus: A Dramatic Mystery; The Bride of Connth; The First Walpurgis Night, 'translated by J.A.' (London: Longman 1835)
- Xeniola: Poems including Translations from Schiller and de la Motte-Fouqué (Dublin: R. Milliken 1837)
- The Fairy Child in the Ballad Poetry of Ireland, Charles Gavan Duffy, ed.(1845)
- Introductory Lecture on the Study of the Roman Civil Law (Dublin: Hodges & Smith 1850)
- Schiller, Dublin University Magazine, Vol. VII, No. 37 (Jan. 1856)
- Faustus: The Second Part, from the German of Goethe (London: Longman 1864)
- German Literature at the Close of the Last Century and the Commencement of the Present, in Afternoon Lectures on Literature and Art (Dublin: Hodges & Smith; London: Bell & Daldy 1864), pp. 151–95.
