= National Economic and Social Council =

Advisory body to the Irish Prime Minister

The National Economic and Social Council (NESC) (Irish An Chomhairle Náisiúnta Eacnamaíoch Shóisialta) is an independent body that advises the Taoiseach (Irish Prime Minister) on areas of policy relating to social and economic development. It was part of the Social Partnership model that became part of Irish politics before the Celtic Tiger years. Its findings can hold a considerable amount of information about problems in existing public sector operations, such as how unemployed people are incentivized to remain unemployed, but these findings are not always acted upon.

== Current work ==
The council is currently working on three projects:

- Unemployment and Active Labour Market Policies, 2011-2015
- The Role of Standards in the Provision of Quality Human Services
- Ireland’s Economic Recovery: Recognising Performance – Finding Shared Goals
