= Brendan Whelan =

Brendan J. Whelan was Director of the Economic and Social Research Institute (ESRI) in Dublin, Ireland from 1996 to 2006, having previously been head of the survey unit at the institute. From 2007 to 2009 he was Research Director of the TILDA project at Trinity College Dublin. He has master's degrees in economics from University College Dublin and in statistics from the London School of Economics.

Most of Brendan Whelan's research has been concerned with the application of statistical methods to the collection and analysis of economic and social data. He designed sampling systems, and played crucial role the household surveys of the Economic and Social Research Institute in Ireland. He has published on fisheries, voting patterns, and social mobility. His recent research is focused on ageing.

Brendan Whelan has been a member of several committees, including the Network on Panel Surveys of the European Science Foundation and Research and Methodology Advisory Group of Eurostat.

Brendan Whelan regularly appears in the media.
