= Regius Professor of Laws (Dublin) =

Professorship at Trinity College Dublin

The Regius Professorship of Laws is a professorship at Trinity College Dublin (TCD). It is one of the oldest chairs in the college, having been founded in 1668. Professor Mark Bell has held the post since July 2015.

== History of the Chair ==
In the founding charter of Trinity College, Elizabeth I granted the university the right to award degrees in omnibus artibus et facultatibus, including law. There were no other ways to train legally in Ireland until the mid-19th century. Even in early regulations, there was a professor of civil law who was responsible for the exams and the training standards. Before 1668, the teaching of jurisprudence was under the control of the university administration. One of the Fellows taught law for one semester. There was no permanent professorship.

The first mention of a publicly appointed professor is on 20 November 1667, when Henry Styles was appointed the first publ. Prof. Legum. By a letter of Charles II. On 4 November 1668, a professorship was newly established as the Regius Professor of Civil and Canon Law and supported with funds from the Act of Settlement with 40 pounds sterling per year.

Down through the centuries, the chair of Civil and Canon Law was usually occupied by a fellow from the college, a practice that was expressly prohibited, for example, in the Chair of Feudal and English Law (which was founded in 1761). When this latter chair came to require written examination regulations in the mid-19th century, the civil law chair was reformed at the same time, the salary was increased and the practice of appointing a fellow was abandoned. From then on, the professor had to be a doctor of law, a barrister with at least six years of professional experience. In 1871 it was even stipulated that a fellow appointed professor had to give up his fellowship.

Nevertheless, the chair was just a sinecure for many of the holders. Notable exceptions were people such as Francis Stoughton Sullivan, who later became the first Regius Professor of Feudal and English Law, or Arthur Brown, who also campaigned politically for the goals of the university.

It was not until the mid-19th century that the division of responsibilities between the Regius Professor of Laws (Roman law, general law and international law) and that of Feudal and English Law (property law) made the chair a permanent first-class position in university teaching. In 1944, Frances Elizabeth Moran took over the chair, becoming the first woman in Ireland (or indeed Britain) to be a professor in law To date, no other woman had been appointed to a Regius Professorship of Laws at TCD.

== List of Regius Professors of Laws ==
Regius Professors of Laws since its founding in 1688 include:

- Henry Styles, 1668
- George Brown, 1686
- John Barton, 1693
- Benjamin Pratt, 1704
- John Elwood, 1710
- Robert Shawe, 1740
- John Forster, 1743
- Brabazon Disney, 1747
- John Whittingham, 1749
- Francis Stoughton Sullivan, 1750
- Patrick Duigenan, 1766
- Michael Kearney, 1776
- James Drought, 1778
- Henry Joseph Dabzac, 1779
- John Forsayeth, 1782
- Gerald FitzGerald, 1783
- Arthur Browne, 1785
- Francis Hodgkinson, 1806
- Robert Phibbs, 1808
- Richard Graves, 1809
- Francis Hodgkinson, 1810
- Christopher Edmund Allen, 1817
- Richard MacDonnell, 1840
- Henry Wray, 1841
- John Lewis Moore, 1844
- John Anster, 1850
- Thomas E. Webb, 1867
- Henry Brougham Leech, 1888
- Charles Francis Bastable, 1908, retired 1932
- Vacant, 1932–34
- Samuel Lombard Brown, 1934
- Vacant, 1939–44
- Frances Elizabeth Moran, 1944
- Vincent Thomas Hyginus Delany, 1963
- John Desmond Morton, 1965
- Charles Beuno McKenna, 1966
- Robert Heuston, 1970
- Paul O'Higgins, 1984
- William Binchy, 1992
- Mark Bell, 2015

== List of Regius Professors of Feudal and English Law (1761–1934) ==
In 1761, a second Regius Professorship was introduced by George III, the Regius Chair of Feudal and English Law. This chair would be continuously occupied until it was discontinued in 1934 and replaced by The Professorship of Laws.

- Francis Stoughton Sullivan, 1761
- Patrick Palmer, 1766
- Patrick Duigenan, 1776
- Philip Cecil Crampton, 1816
- Samuel Mountifort Longfield, 1834
- Edmund Thomas Bewley, 1884
- George Vaughan Hart, 1891
- James Sinclair Baxter, 1909–33
