= Henry Chichester Hart =

Anglo-Irish botanist, explorer, and editor (1847–1908)

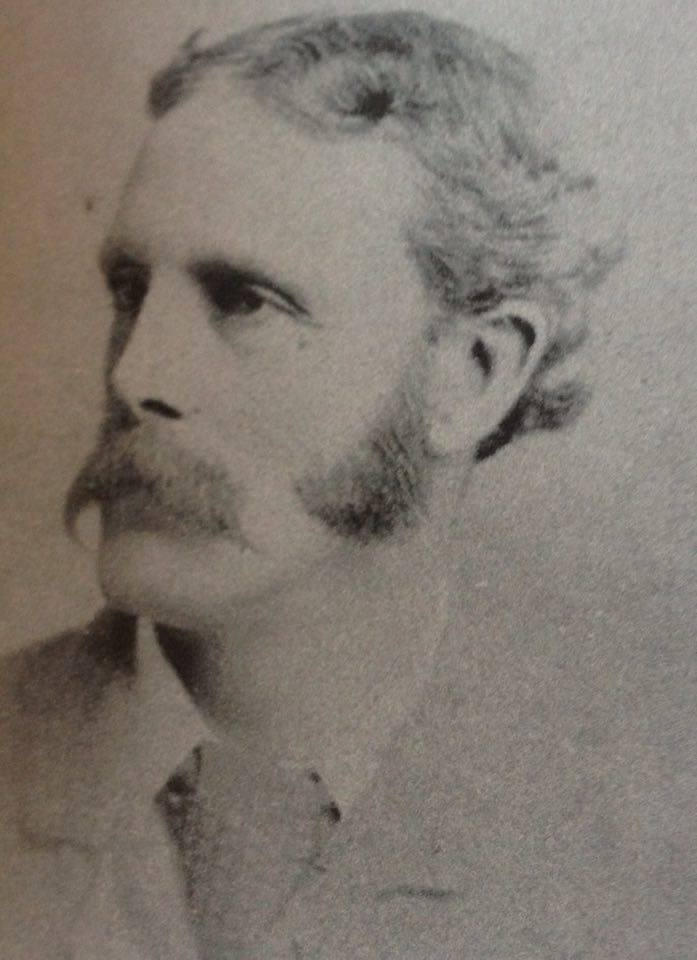
- Born: 1847
- Died: 1908 (aged 60–61)
- Education: Trinity College, Dublin
- Known for: Exploration, climbing, walking
- Scientific career
- Fields: Natural history, Botany

Henry Chichester Hart MRIA FLS (1847–1908) was an Anglo-Irish botanist and explorer.

== Early life ==
He was the son of Sir Andrew Searle Hart and his wife Frances MacDougall, daughter of Henry MacDougall, Q.C., of Dublin. He was educated at Trinity College, Dublin, with a B.A. in experimental and natural science.

== Botany and exploration ==
From the age of 17, Hart conducted a botanical survey of Donegal (lasting until 1898), which led to his publication Flora of the County Donegal, widely regarded as his most important botanical work. The publication was destroyed during a fire as part of the 1916 Easter Rising.

In 1886, H. C. Hart wagered fifty guineas with the naturalist R. M. Barrington that he could walk the 111 km (69 mi) between the tram terminus in Terenure in Dublin, Ireland to the summit of Lugnaquilla in Wicklow and back in under 24 hours. Hart, accompanied by Sir Frederick Cullinan, walked from Terenure to Lugnaquilla, in the Wicklow Mountains - a total of 75 miles - and back in 24 hours, making a record at the time. Hart left Terenure at 10:58 pm on 20 June 1886 and arrived back at 10:48 pm the next evening. The success of this challenge is remembered by the commemorative Hart Walk.

In 1875–1876, Hart accompanied Sir George Strong Nares as a naturalist on his British Arctic Expedition. He was also a naturalist on the Palestine Exploration Fund's 1883-1884 expedition to Palestine.

== Personal life ==
In 1887, he married Edith Susan Anna Donelly (1852-1901), daughter of William Donnely, C.B., L.L.D, of Dublin. They had two daughters and divorced in 1897.

Hart was also interested in Elizabethan literature and he edited numerous Shakespeare plays for the Arden Shakespeare and many works by Ben Jonson for Methuen's Standard Library.

He lived at Carrablagh House, Portsalon, County Donegal. He was High Sheriff of Donegal in 1895.

== Publications ==
1. On the botany of the British polar expedition of 1875–1876, (1880).
2. On the botany of Sinai and South Palestine, (1885).
3. Flora of Howth, (Hodges, Figgis, 1887).
4. The animals mentioned in the Bible, (Religious Tract Society, 1888).
5. Flora of the County Donegal, (Sealy, Bryers and Walker; 1898).

The standard author abbreviation Hart is used to indicate this person as the author when citing a botanical name.
