= Regius Professor of Civil Law =

Regius Professor of Civil Law may refer to:

- Regius Professor of Civil Law (Oxford)
- Regius Professor of Civil Law (Cambridge)
