= George Alexander Duncan =

Irish economist (1902–2006)

- Born: 15 May 1902
- Died: 14 January 2006 (aged 103)

George Alexander Duncan (15 May 1902 – 14 January 2006), publishing as G. A. Duncan, was an Irish economist and academic, specialising in political economy and the Austrian school of economics. He was Professor of Political Economy at the Trinity College Dublin from 1934 to 1967, and Pro-Chancellor of the University of Dublin from 1965 to 1972.

== Selected works ==
- Duncan, G. A. (February 1927). "Rural industries: an example from North Carolina". Journal of the Statistical and Social Inquiry Society of Ireland. XIV (4): 331–351. hdl:2262/4365.
- Duncan, G. A. (December 1941). "The First Year of War: Its Economic Effects on Twenty Six Counties of Ireland". Economic Journal. 51 (204): 389–399. doi:10.2307/2226367. JSTOR 2226367.
- Duncan, G. A. (1946). International Trade. London: Royal Institute of International Affairs.
