= Statistical and Social Inquiry Society of Ireland =

Learned society focused on demographics and administrative topics

The Statistical and Social Inquiry Society of Ireland
- Formation: 1847
- Headquarters: Dublin, Republic of Ireland
- President: Patrick Paul Walsh
- Website: www.ssisi.ie

The Statistical and Social Inquiry Society of Ireland (SSISI) is a learned society which analyses the major changes that have taken place in population, employment, legal and administrative systems and social services in Ireland. It operates as an all-Ireland body.

The Society was founded in Dublin in 1847 by a group of Irish academics, clergymen, aristocrats and politicians. Its first president was Richard Whately. From its establishment until the 1920s the overwhelming majority of members were Unionists of the Anglo-Irish class, who were, generally speaking, more sympathetic to the British administration in Ireland than with the Irish Home Rule movement. As a result, most papers read to the Society until at least 1870 were in favour of assimilating the laws and practices in Ireland to those applying in England and Wales. Even so, official political or religious endorsement has never been allowed in the Society. During the nineteenth century it frequently provided an important platform for people who were concerned about major social problems, such as the care of orphans and neglected children. The key figures associated with the founding of the Irish National Society for the Prevention of Cruelty to Children in 1889 were prominent members of the Society.

From 1924, several Irish nationalists became presidents of the SSISI. In addition, the Society began to enroll a substantial number of senior officials from the new Irish civil service, and as such has formed a close relationship with the Irish state. The Journal of the Society has provided one of the few opportunities to penetrate the official anonymity of the Irish public service; senior civil servants have spoken more freely on crucial aspects of government policy at SSISI meetings than in any other public forum. On the whole the papers presented to the Society have been concerned with practical problems, such as crime, poverty and economic progress, and by a common concern with the condition of Ireland.

The current president of SSISI is Frances P. Ruane, who is only the second female president in the Society's history. The Society often meets at the Royal Irish Academy and its journal is printed with the help of Trinity College Dublin, where Honorary Secretary Ronan C. Lyons is based, and disseminated with the help of the Central Statistics Office and the Central Bank of Ireland.

== Presidents ==
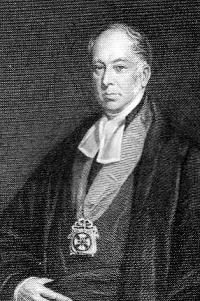
Richard Whately, 1st President of the SSISI

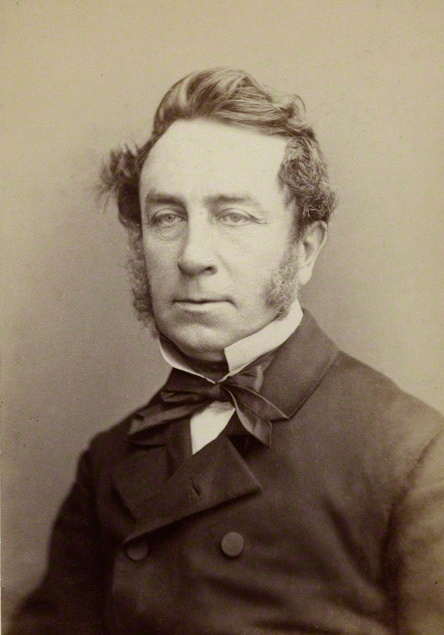
Lord O'Hagan, 3rd President of the SSISI

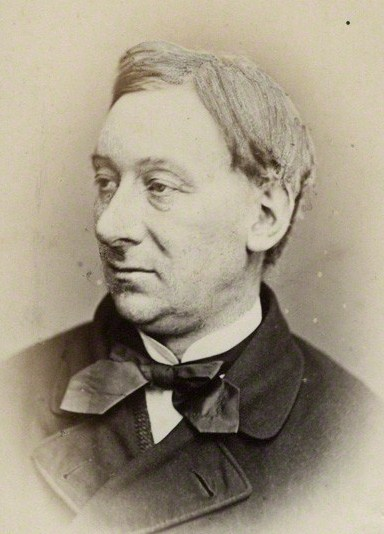
Lord Emly, 5th President of the SSISI

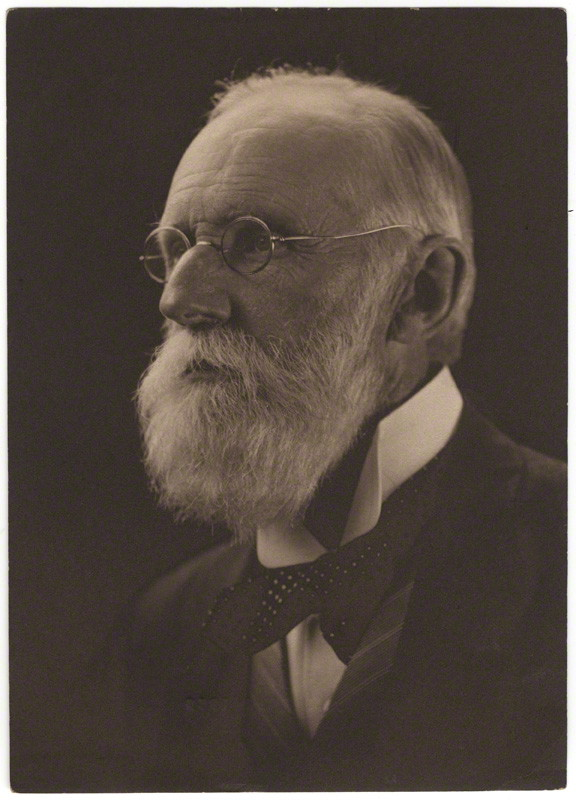
Lord Monteagle of Brandon, 11th President of the SSISI

Since 1847, the SSISI has appointed numerous notable figures from academia and politics as its president:

- Richard Whately (1847–1863)
- Mountifort Longfield (1863–1867)
- Thomas O'Hagan, 1st Baron O'Hagan (1867–1870)
- James Anthony Lawson (1870–1872)
- William Monsell, 1st Baron Emly (1872–1875)
- Jonathan Pim (1875–1877)
- John Lentaigne (1877–1878)
- John Kells Ingram (1878–1880)
- Edward Dillon Mapother (1880–1881)
- William Neilson Hancock (1881–1882)
- Thomas Spring Rice, 2nd Baron Monteagle of Brandon (1882–1884)
- James McDonnell (1884–1888)
- Thomas Wrigley Grimshaw (1888–1890)
- John O'Hagan (1890–1891)
- William Findlater (1891–1894)
- William Huston Dodd (1894–1896)
- Joseph Todhunter Pim (1896–1900)
- James Johnston Shaw (1900–1902)
- William Frederick Bailey (1902–1904)
- Robert Edwin Matheson (1904–1906)
- Arthur Samuels (1906–1908)
- Richard Cherry (1908–1911)
- Thomas A. Finlay (1911–1913)
- Charles Athill Stanuell (1913–1917)
- William Lawson (1917–1918)
- William John Thompson (1918–1920)
- Sir Thomas Molony, 1st Baronet (1920–1924)
- Charles Hubert Oldham (1924–1926)
- James Creed Meredith (1926–1929)
- John Hooper (1929–1930)
- J.C.M. Eason (1930–1934)
- Joseph Brennan (1934–1938)
- Stanley G Lyon (1938–1942)
- George O'Brien (1942–1946)
- Roy C. Geary (1946–1951)
- Joseph Johnston (1951–1953)
- Jim P. Beddy (1953–1956)
- James Meenan (1957–1959)
- William A. Honohan (1959–1962)
- M. Donal McCarthy (1962–1965)
- Patrick Bourke (1965–1968)
- Thomas Kenneth Whitaker (1968–1971)
- Thekla J. Beere (1971–1974)
- Thomas P. Linehan (1974–1977)
- Brendan Menton Snr (1977–1980)
- Robert O'Connor (1980–1983)
- Robert Dennis Collison Black (1983–1986)
- Jerry J. Sexton (1986–1989)
- Kieran A. Kennedy (1989–1992)
- Padraig McGowan (1992–1995)
- Dermot McAleese (1995–1998)
- William Keating (1998–2001)
- Brendan Walsh (2001–2004)
- Aidan Punch (2004–2007)
- Dónal de Buitléir (2007–2010)
- Paul Sweeney (2010–2013)
- John D. FitzGerald (2013–2016)
- Frances P. Ruane (2016–2019)
- Danny McCoy (2019–2022)
- Patrick Paul Walsh (2022–present)
