= Regius Professor of Meteorology and Climate Science =

Regius Professor of Meteorology and Climate Science University of Reading
- Incumbent; Hannah Cloke since 2026
- Formation: 2013
- First holder: Keith Shine

The Regius Professor of Meteorology and Climate Science is a royal professorship established in 2013 at the University of Reading in England. The chair is attached to Reading's Department of Meteorology.

== History ==
In 2013 Queen Elizabeth II endowed new Regius Professors at 12 universities across the United Kingdom, as a part of her Diamond Jubilee celebrations. This was the first Regius Professorship to be established at the University of Reading, and the first in the fields of either meteorology or climate science.

== List of professors ==
- 2013−2026 Keith Shine
- 2026− Hannah Cloke
