= Hannah Cloke =

British hydrologist

Hannah Cloke OBE
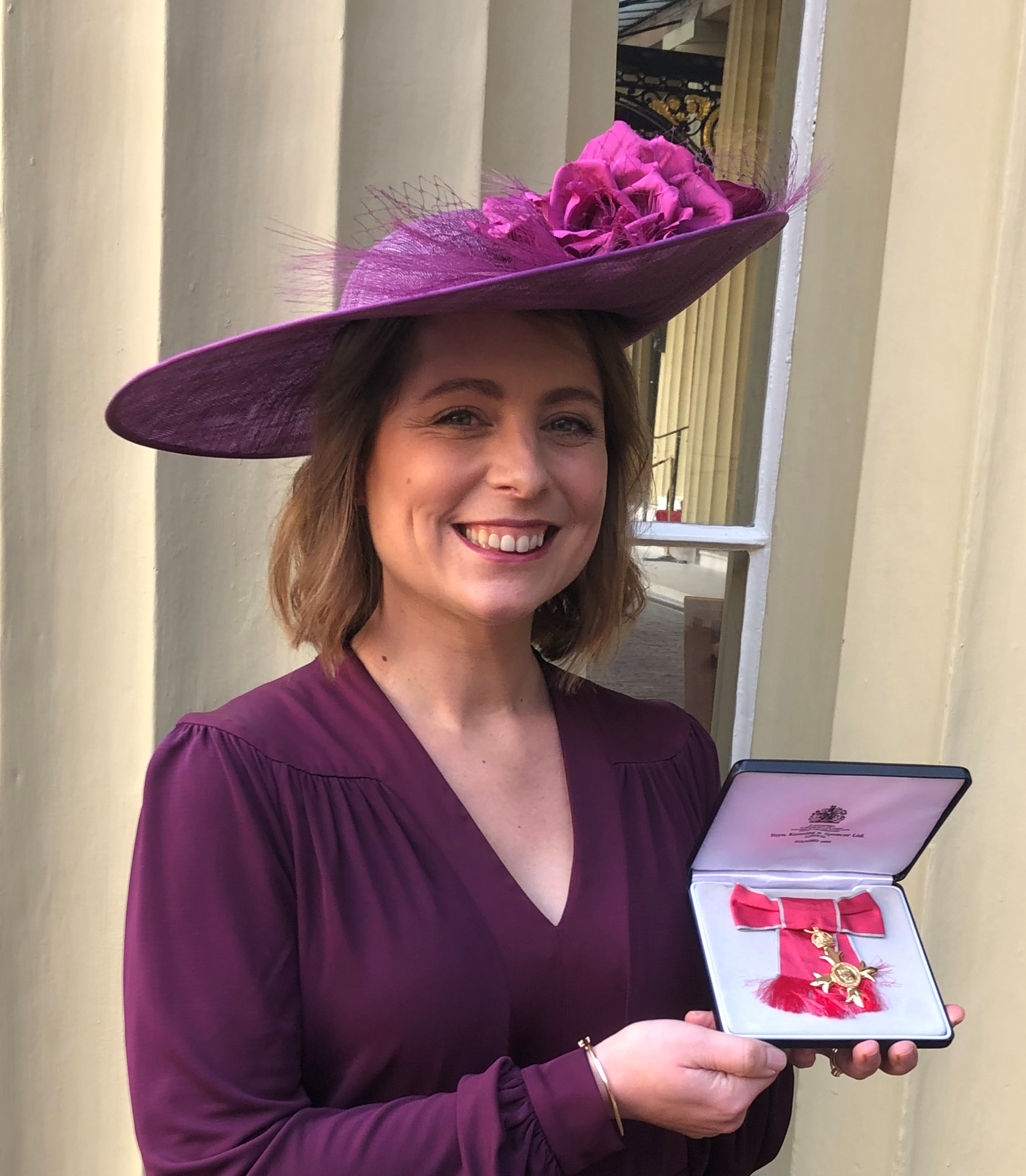
- Cloke at Buckingham Palace
- Born: Hannah Louise Cloke
- Education: University of Bristol (BSc, PhD)
- Awards: Plinius Medal (2018)
- Scientific career
- Fields: Land surface models Large scale hydrology Ensemble flood forecasting
- Workplaces: University of Reading; King's College London
- Thesis: Modelling riparian hydrology and streamflow generation (2003)
- Website: www.reading.ac.uk/h-l-cloke.aspx

Hannah Louise Cloke OBE is a British hydrologist who is Regius Professor of Meteorology and Climate Science at the University of Reading. She was awarded the European Geosciences Union Plinius Medal in 2018 and appointed Officer of the Order of the British Empire in the 2019 Birthday Honours.

== Early life and education ==
Cloke's father was a geography teacher and her uncle is a professor of human geography. She studied geography at the University of Bristol where she earned her bachelor's degree in 1999 and a PhD in 2003. Cloke worked at the Joint Research Centre on the European Flood Awareness System.

== Research and career ==
Cloke joined the Department of Geography at King's College London. She was part of the Europeanizing Flood Forecasting program, which looked at flood forecasting and management in the European Union.

She joined the University of Reading in 2012, where she held the post of professor of hydrology. In 2026, Cloke was appointed as the Regius Professor of Meteorology and Climate Science in the University of Reading, succeeding Professor Keith Shine FRS.

Cloke co-directs the Water@Reading group, which concentrates on water science, policy and societal impacts. She is the Director of the Natural Environment Research Council programme Flooding from Intense Rainfall. She is interested in flood forecasting and risk management, leading the project TENDERLY (Towards END-to End flood forecasting and a tool for ReaL-time catchment susceptibilitY). She works with the Met Office, Environmental Agency and the European Centre for Medium-Range Weather Forecasts (ECMWF). Cloke's Global Flood Awareness System is a partnership between the European Commission and the ECMWF, and provides hydrological monitoring and forecasting that is independent of political boundaries. She was also involved with the Natural Environment Research Council projects Susceptibility of catchments to INTense RAinfall and flooding (SINATRA) and Improving Predictions of Drought for User Decision-Making (IMPETUS). Since climate change will make flooding more probable, Cloke says that we should start to take precautions to protect homes and livelihoods.

Cloke's research helps policymakers make better decisions about flood preparation. She has discussed the problems with the United Kingdom's flood defence systems. She called for the National Flood Resilience Review to evaluate how flood risks are likely to change in different locations across the United Kingdom. She is supported by the European Commission Horizon 2020 programme. In 2019 Cloke created IMPREXive, a game that allowed players to control flood forecasting during a deluge. The information provided to the players is not always correct; and decisions must be made to keep cities safe.

She has written for The Conversation and The Guardian. She was the guest on The Life Scientific on BBC Radio 4 in October 2021.

== Awards and honours ==
Her awards and honours include;

- 2013 Natural Environment Research Council Early Career Impact Award
- 2016 Guardian Research Impact Award runner-up
- 2018 European Geosciences Union Plinius Medal
- 2019 Officer of the Order of the British Empire
- 2026 Regius Professor in Meteorology and Climate Science
