= Regius Professor of Hebrew =

Regius Professor of Hebrew may refer to:

- Regius Professor of Hebrew (Cambridge), a professorship in the University of Cambridge
- Regius Professor of Hebrew (Oxford), a professorship at the University of Oxford
- Regius Professor of Hebrew (Dublin), a professorship at the University of Dublin.
