= List of professorships at the University of Dublin =

This is a list of professorships, other notable positions, and public lectures at Trinity College Dublin.

The chairs in French (1776), German (1776), Irish (1840), English Literature (1867) and the precursor (1776) of the current Chair of Spanish (1926) are the oldest in the world in their respective subjects, as some others may be, or thereabouts - the Chair of Civil Engineering (1842) is the third oldest engineering professorship in the world (very soon after Paris and London).

Only professorships more than 50 years old are listed, as are some other notable historical positions (e.g. Donegall Lecturer in Mathematics (1668), now mostly an honorary, usually one-year, title for a distinguished visiting mathematician). Some old chairs transferred to other institutions (e.g. the four King's Professors of Medicine to The Royal College of Physicians of Ireland, which also previously appointed the professors) or were discontinued with changing circumstances, especially those beyond the ordinary (e.g. Chair of English Feudal Law).

== List of professorships ==
- Regius Chair of Physic (1637)
- Regius Professor of Laws (1668)
- Donegall Lectureship (1668)
- University Chair of Chemistry (1711)
- University Professor of Botany (1711)
- University Anatomist (1716)
- Erasmus Smith's Professor of Natural and Experimental Philosophy (1724)
- Erasmus Smith's Professor of Hebrew (1724)
- Regius Professor of Greek (1761)
- Erasmus Smith's Professor of Modern History (1762)
- Erasmus Smith's Professor of Mathematics (1762)
- Chair of Music (1764)
- Professor of French (1776)
- Professor of German (1776)
- Andrews Professor of Astronomy (1783) (honorary)
- University Chair of Anatomy and Chirurgery (1800)
- Whately Chair of Political Economy (1832)
- Chair of Moral Philosophy (1837)
- Chair of Irish (1840)
- Chair of Civil Engineering (1842)
- Chair of Geology and Mineralogy (1843)
- University Chair of Natural Philosophy (1847)
- Professor of Surgery (1848)
- Regius Chair of Surgery (1852)
- Professor of English Literature (1867)
- Chair of Latin (1870)
- Louis Claude Purser Chair of Ancient History (1871)
- Chair of Zoology and Comparative Anatomy (1871)
- Public Orator (1879)
- Professor of Pastoral Theology (1888)
- Reid Professor of Criminal Law, Criminology and Penology (1888) (The former title of this chair was Reid Professor of Penal Legislation, Constitutional and Criminal Law, and the Law of Evidence (1888) which was amended by the High Court on 3 March 1975. Appointments to this chair are made on the lecturer scale)
- Lecturer in Medical Jurisprudence (1888)
- Professor of Pathology (1895)
- Chair of Education (1905)
- Lecky Chair of History (1913) (a Medieval History Chair (although Lecky himself was a modern historian) and previously styled the 'Lecky Chair of Modern History (1913)'
- Professor of Microbiology (1919) (formerly 'Prof. of Bacteriology and Preventive Medicine')
- Chair of General Chemistry (1922)
- Chair of Human Anatomy and Embryology (1922)
- Professor of Physiology (1922)
- Chair of Spanish (1926) (the precursor was a 'Prof. of Modern Languages' covering both Italian and Spanish' created in 1776)
- Professor of Physical Chemistry (1935)
- Professor of Medicine (1955)
- Professor of Biostatistics (2019)
- Workday Professor of Technology and Society (2023)

Discontinued / evolved into or merged with other positions / No longer separately listed in College Calendar:

- Regius Professor of Divinity (1607,? 1600)
- Professor of Theological Controversies (1607?, or earlier). Considered then the most important professorship in the University of Dublin
- Regius Professor of Hebrew (1637/1762/1855)

The next four are the 'King's Professors of Medicine' (transferred to the Royal College of Physicians of Ireland)

- King's Professor of Practice of Medicine (1717)
- King's Professor of Materia Medica and Pharmacy (1749)
- King's Professor of Institutes of Medicine (1786)
- King's Professor of Midwifery (1827)
- Archbishop King's Professor of Divinity (1718)
- Erasmus Smith's Professor of Oratory and History (1724) (merged with Erasmus Smith's Professor of Modern History (1762), see above)
- Professor of Biblical Greek (1838)
- Professor of English Feudal Law
- Lecturer on the Bible (1898)
- Wallace Divinity Lecturer (1901)
- Lecturer in the Practice of Electrical Engineering (1902)
- Lecturer in Anaesthetics (1910)
- Lecturer in Dental Surgery and Therapeutics (1910)
- Lecturer in Dental Prosthetics (1919)
- Lecturer in Roman Law (1920)
- Professor of Plant Biology (1922)
- Professor of Laws (1934)
- Louis Claude Purser Lecturer in Classical Archaeology (1934)
- Lecturer in Dental Anatomy and Physiology (1937)
- CATHECHIST
- Catechists (Presbyterian Church)
  - 'Professorships without any year of foundation against them in calendar of 1961-62'
- Professor of Materia Medica and Therapeutics (Robert Henry Minks appointed in 1952)
- Professor of Social Medicine (William John Edward Jessop appointed in 1952)
- Professor of Midwifery and Gynaecology (John Brown Fleming appointed in 1953)
- Professor of Clinical Surgery (Robert Francis Jack Henry appointed in 1960)
- Professor of Clinical Medicine (Peter Barry Bronte Gatenby appointed in 1960)
- Professor in Pre-Clinical Veterinary Sciences (Veterinary Sciences transferred to UCD)
- Professor in Clinical Veterinary Sciences (Veterinary Sciences transferred to UCD)
- Professor in Clinical Veterinary Practices (Veterinary Sciences transferred to UCD)

Chairs that existed for brief periods, or especially for one holder only

- Professor of Geophysics (1934 for John Hewitt Jellett Poole only)
- Professor of Applied Economics (1939 for Joseph Johnson only)
- Professor of Experimental Medicine (1943 for Robert Allen Quain O'Meara only)
- Berkeley Professor of Metaphysics (1953 for Arthur Aston Luce only)
- Professor of Industrial Economics (William James Louden Ryan appointed in 1961)
- Professor of Experimental Nutrition (1978 for John Scott only)

== Public lectures ==
- The Donnellan lectures

The Donnellan lectures were founded by the board on 22 February 1794, to carry out the intentions of Miss Anne Donnellan, of the parish of St George, Hanover Square, Middlesex, spinster, who bequeathed £1,243 to the College "for the encouragement of religion, learning, and good manners; the particular mode of application being left to the Provost and Senior Fellows". The subject is presented in not less than two lectures.

- The E.S. and R. Duthie lecture in microbiology

In 1984 the late Mrs Ruth Duthie made a gift of £1,000 to the college, which she augmented in 1989 by a further £1,000, to fund a lecture to be delivered once every two years, the lecturer to be chosen by the Professor of Microbiology and the Head of the Unit of Clinical Microbiology.

- The Hely-Hutchinson memorial lecture

In 1976 the Earl of Donoughmore, together with members of the Hely-Hutchinson family, endowed a visiting lectureship in memory of John Hely-Hutchinson who established the Chairs of Modern Languages and Literature in 1776 (during his term as Provost). The lectures are given every second year by a scholar or writer of the highest distinction in the modern languages and literature field.

- The Joly memorial lectures

After the death of John Joly, F.T.C.D., SC.D., F.R.S., professor of geology and mineralogy 1897–1933, a number of his friends subscribed a sum of money to found a series of lectures in his memory.

- The MacNeill lectures

This lectureship was founded in 1970 from a benefaction provided by the Engineering School Trust Fund to commemorate Sir John MacNeill, the first professor of civil engineering in the university. A public lecture is delivered every year by a lecturer appointed by the board.

- The Normanby lecture in microbiology

Founded in 1996 by the Department of Microbiology in recognition of the generous support given to the department by the Dowager Marchioness of Normanby and her family, which includes funding the construction of the Moyne Institute of Preventive Medicine in 1953 and the provision of additional research facilities within the institute since then. The lecture is delivered annually by a research scientist who has made an outstanding contribution to the field of microbiology.

- The O'Donnell lectures in Celtic history and literature

These lectures take their name from Charles James O’Donnell 1850–1934, who bequeathed a sum of money to found annual lectures in the Universities of Oxford, Wales and Edinburgh, the National University of Ireland, and the University of Dublin. In the British universities the lectures are on the Celtic element in the English language and population; in the Irish universities they are on Irish history since Cromwell, with special reference to the history of ancient Irish families since 1641. The first O’Donnell lecture given in the University of Dublin was in 1957.

- The Royal Dublin Society lecture

In 1981, on the occasion of its 250th anniversary, the Royal Dublin Society commemorated the college meeting to which it traces its origins by endowing a biennial lecture on aspects of Irish social and economic policy and history with special reference to the contribution of individuals and institutions.

- The W.B. Stanford memorial lectures

These lectures were founded in 1988 from funds provided by subscription to commemorate William Bedell Stanford, Regius Professor of Greek 1940–1980, and chancellor of the university 1983–1984. A series of three public lectures is delivered twice every three years by a lecturer appointed by the board. It is intended that the lectures shall be published.

- The John Lighton Synge public lecture

This lecture was established in 1992 from funds subscribed by friends and past colleagues and students to honour John Lighton Synge, F.R.S., M.R.I.A. [Scholar (1916), Fellow and Professor of Natural Philosophy (1925–30), Honorary Fellow (1954-95)]. The lecture is delivered once every two years by a lecturer appointed by the School of Mathematics.

- The H. O. White memorial lectures

These lectures were founded in 1964 from funds provided by subscription to commemorate Herbert Martyn Oliver White, Professor of English Literature 1939–60. A public lecture is delivered every two or three years by a lecturer appointed by the Board and is followed by a seminar for senior students in English literature.

- The Godfrey Day memorial lectures

The Godfrey Day memorial lectureship was founded by the Board on 9 December 1939. Each year a lecture (or lectures) on a missionary theme is organised. The Board appoints the lecturer on the nomination of the Missionary Council of the Church of Ireland which is at all times advised by the committee of the Dublin University Far Eastern Mission.

- The Sarah Davis memorial lectures in communications in health care

A public lecture is given from time to time financed by a fund established by colleagues and friends to commemorate Sarah Davis, 1943–82, who was a member of staff of the Department of Statistics. The objective of the fund is to promote the study of communications in health care by organising occasional lectures and other means.

=== Public lectures in the School of Medicine ===
- The Mary Louisa Prentice Montgomery lectures in ophthalmology
- The John Mallet Purser lectures
- The Frederick Price lectures
- The T. J. D. Lane lectures
