= Hans Das =

European civil servant and humanitarian

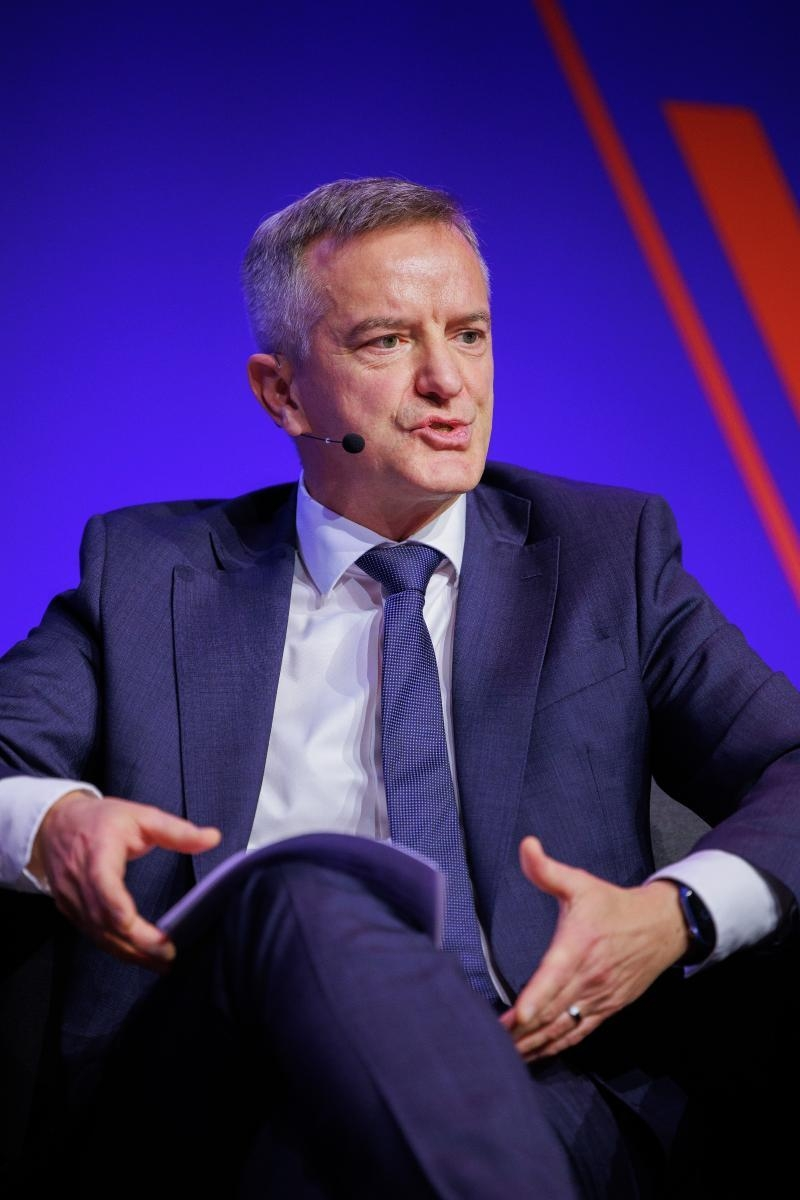
- Das speaking at the European Civil Protection Forum in 2024

Deputy Director-General and Chief Operating Officer of DG ECHO
- Incumbent
- Assumed office 1 February 2024
- Commission: Von der Leyen I and II

Personal details
- Citizenship: Belgium
- Education: KU Leuven (LLM, PhD); Geneva Graduate Institute (DES)
- Profession: European civil servant

Hans Das is a European civil servant of Belgian nationality, currently serving, since February 2024, as Deputy Director-General and Chief Operating Officer of DG ECHO at the European Commission, the humanitarian arm of the European Union.

Hans Das undertook his legal studies at KU Leuven, completing his PhD in law in 2004. From 1994 to 1996, he also obtained a Diplôme d'études supérieures (DES) in International Relations from the Graduate Institute Geneva.

Prior to joining the commission, Das worked in the Balkans, first in Bosnia and Herzegovina as director of the legal department for the Commission for Real Property Claims of Displaced Persons and Refugees from 1997 to 1999. Later, he became a senior legal advisor at the Kosovo United Nations Centre for Human Settlements, from 1999 to 2000. Upon returning he worked in foreign policy for the Flemish Government, whilst continuing to complete his doctorate.

In 2004, Hans Das joined the European Commission and became a policy officer at DG ENV. In 2007, he moved to DG ECHO where he would henceforth build most of his professional career. He led the emergency response unit and, later, the civil protection policy and international cooperation team. From 2016 to 2020, he headed counter-terrorism and prevention of radicalisation for DG HOME, before returning to ECHO in 2020 as Director for Emergency Management and rescEU, the strategic reserve of European disaster response capabilities and stockpiles. On 1 February 2024, he was promoted to the rank of Director-General. As part of his responsibilities, he leads the Emergency Response Coordination Centre.

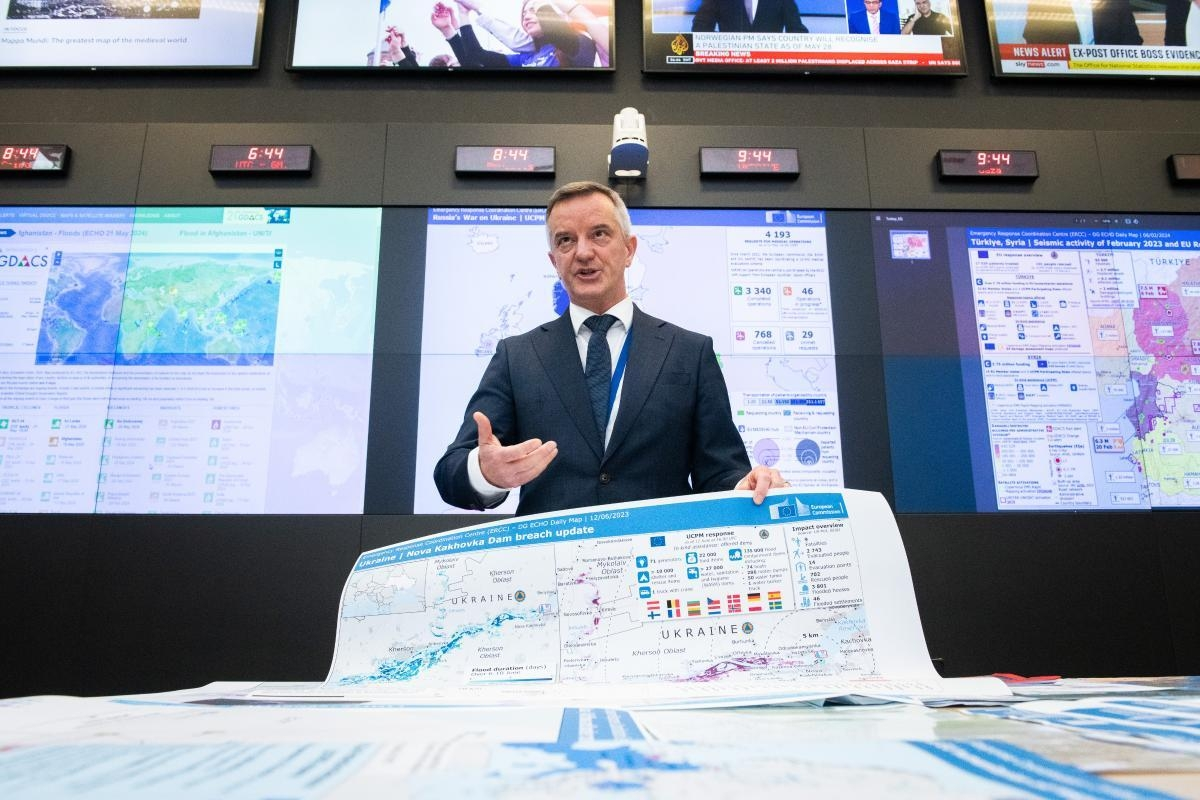
Hans Das at the Emergency Response Coordination Centre in 2024 speaking to the 27 COREPER II Ambassadors

Das also works on the coordination of the humanitarian response to the ongoing Russian war of aggression against Ukraine and on adapting the EU's preparedness to the shifting geopolitical landscape.

A native Dutch-speaker, Das also speaks French and English.
