= Regius Professor of Surgery =

Regius Professor of Surgery may refer to:

- Regius Professor of Surgery (Aberdeen)
- Regius Professor of Surgery (Dublin)
- Regius Chair of Clinical Surgery, Edinburgh
- Regius Professor of Surgery (Glasgow)
