= Emergency Response Coordination Centre =

Diplomatic service and ministry of the EU

Emergency Response Coordination Centre (ERCC)

Agency overview
- Formed: 15 May 2013
- Preceding agency: Monitoring and Information Centre (MIC)
- Jurisdiction: Directorate-General for European Civil Protection and Humanitarian Aid Operations, European Commission
- Headquarters: Brussels
- Website: https://erccportal.jrc.ec.europa.eu/Home/About

The Emergency Response Coordination Centre (ERCC) serves as the operational centre of the European Union Civil Protection Mechanism (UCPM), which was established by Regulation 836/2021, amending Decision 1313/2013.

The UCPM represents enhanced cooperation between all 27 European Union (EU) Member States and 10 additional participating states, with a focus on prevention, preparedness, and response.

The ERCC coordinates the delivery of assistance of the EU Member States and the 10 UCPM participating states to disaster-stricken countries, such as relief items, expertise, civil protection teams and specialised equipment. The centre is an integral part of the European Commission's Directorate-General for European Civil Protection and Humanitarian Aid Operations (DG ECHO), and it operates continuously 24/7 from its headquarters in Brussels.

When an emergency hits, the UCPM can be activated following a request for assistance. The request can be made by a national authority, a United Nation (UN) body or a recognised international organisation, such as the International Organization for Migration (IOM) or the International Federation of Red Cross and Red Crescent Societies (IFRC). Following a request for assistance, the ERCC acts as a coordination hub between the civil protection authorities of the EU Member States, the 10 additional participating states to the UCPM, the affected country, and the humanitarian aid community to mobilise assistance and ensure the rapid deployment of emergency support. The centre also ensures cooperation and coherence of EU action at an inter-institutional level, focusing on coordination mechanisms with the European External Action Service (EEAS), the European Council and EU Member States. The 24/7 communication and information exchange between the ERCC, the EU Member States and UCPM participating states is based on the Common Emergency Communication and Information System (CECIS), which is a web-based notification application.

The ERCC also serves as the central point of contact when the Solidarity Clause is invoked and/or when the Integrated Political Response Coordination (IPCR) arrangement is triggered by the EU Presidency (on its own initiative or following a request by an EU member state).

== History ==
One of the foundational pillars for the creation of a solidarity mechanism was set in place in 1987, following the Council resolution for the introduction of a Community Cooperation on Civil Protection. This Council resolution led to several others, particularly one in 1991 aimed at improving mutual aid between Member States in the event of natural or technological disasters. Subsequently, in 1997, the Community Action Programme was established in the field of civil protection and began operations in 1999. Eventually, in October 2001, the European Commission established the EU Civil Protection Mechanism (UCPM) to bolster cooperation between the EU countries and participating states, and to pool their emergency response capacities during disasters. At this point, the predecessor of the ERCC, the Monitoring and Information Centre (MIC) was established to monitor, inform and facilitate the coordination of the delivery of assistance in the event of disasters within or outside the EU. In 2007, following the 2004 Indian Ocean Tsunami, the UCPM was reviewed, and a dedicated Civil Protection Financial Instrument was set up to facilitate a rapid response to major disasters allowing co-funding the transport of assistance channelled via the UCPM.

2007 was also the year when the Treaty of Lisbon, was signed by all EU member states and subsequently came into force on 1 December 2009, which brought two important innovations. First, the treaty included the introduction of Art. 196 in Title XXII on Civil Protection encouraging the cooperation amongst EU Member States in the field of civil protection, complementing the national systems. Second, it introduced the Solidarity Clause, which created

‘’one of the most explicit demands upon EU Member States to act jointly and to assist one another in the face of crises, inside and outside, to protect citizens and critical infrastructure’’.

— Article 222

In 2023 with Decision 1313/2023 the UCPM was strengthened and the ERCC, replacing the MIC, was formally established. On 15 May 2013, the ERCC was inaugurated by the commission's president, Jose Manuel Barroso and European Commissioner, for International Cooperation, Humanitarian Aid and Crisis Response, Kristalina Georgieva, and started its 24/7 operations. Decision 1313/2013 also set up a European Emergency Response Capacity (EERC), which consisted of a voluntary pool of pre-committed response capacities from the UCPM participating states, trained experts, and a Common Emergency Communication and Information System (CECIS) that is managed by the ERCC and a contact point for each UCPM participating state.

In early November of the same year 2013, the ERCC was confronted with the first major emergency: typhoon Haiyan. Typhoon Haiyan was one of the strongest tropical storms ever recorded, causing massive devastation in the Philippines, including thousands of deaths. Several EU countries stepped in to provide emergency assistance through the UCPM. This was the first major emergency where the ERCC played its role as a coordinator.

On the 24th of June 2014 the General Affairs Council of the EU adopted a decision on the implementation of the `Solidarity Clause’ (Art. 222 TFEU), where the ERCC was explicitly made to be the central contact point at Union level with Member States’ competent authorities and other stakeholders upon invocation of the Solidarity Clause.

In 2014, during the Ebola crisis in West Africa, the ERCC got involved in responding to a major health crisis. The ERCC coordinated the deployment of emergency supplies and experts and managed evacuation requests in cooperation with the World Health Organisation (WHO). The crisis constituted the largest civil-military cooperation under the UCPM.

In 2019, the EU upgraded the UCPM and established rescEU, as a reserve of European capacities, to further protect citizens from disasters and manage emerging risks, acting as a safety net when other capacities cannot be mobilised. The same year the voluntary pool, the EERC, changed its name to European Civil Protection Pool (ECPP).

From 2020 onwards, the ERCC has become de facto a single crisis coordination hub delivering support for long-term crises, including the COVID-19 pandemic the Russian invasion of Ukraine and the humanitarian crisis in the Gaza Strip following the Gaza war.

== Union Civil Protection Mechanism (UCPM) ==
The ERCC lies at the heart of the UCPM, where it efficiently coordinates support for crises worldwide once the Mechanism has been activated by a request for assistance from an affected country. The aim of the UCPM is to improve prevention, preparedness, and response to disasters. The response function of the UCPM operates in the following way: when a disaster occurs, irrespective of whether it is of natural origin or caused by human activities, a request for assistance can be initiated by activating the UCPM. This call for help can be made by any country across the globe, as well as by the UN, its various agencies, or any significant international organisation (e.g., the International Red Cross and Red Crescent Movement) that may require support in response to the emergency. Once the UCPM is initiated, the request will be posted on CECIS. This allows Member and participating states to respond and provide all or part of the requested aid. The ERCC will then swiftly deploy the assistance or expertise, additionally covering at least 75% of the transport and/or operational costs for the deployment.

UCPM member and participating states.

As of 2024, 37 countries are members of the Mechanism; all 27 EU Member States, in addition to the 10 additional participating states, Iceland, Norway, Serbia, North Macedonia, Montenegro, Turkey, Albania, Moldova, Ukraine and Bosnia and Herzegovina. The Mechanism was set up to enable coordinated assistance from the participating states to victims of natural and man-made disasters in Europe and elsewhere.

=== Notable examples of UCPM responses ===
Since its inception in 2001, the EU Civil Protection Mechanism has responded to over 700 requests for assistance inside and outside the EU. Some notable examples are included below.

2013 Typhoon Haiyan (Philippines): As a response to one of the decade's deadliest tropical cyclones, 26 participating states of the UCPM offered in-kind assistance, including 25 civil protection experts, medical services in the form of medical teams, posts and field hospitals that provided treatment for thousands of patients, shelter and sanitation items and in total 40 million euros of humanitarian and early recovery funding.

2015 Nepal earthquake: In total 17 participating states of the UCPM helped in the form of advanced medical posts and medical teams, search and rescue teams, water purification, Technical Assistance and Support Teams (TAST) and in-kind assistance including shelter, beds, blankets, clothes, medical equipment and medicines. The European Union Civil Protection Team (EUCPT), composed of 10 experts and three Liaison officers, was deployed to Nepal for a total period of 20 days.

2019 Hurricane Ida (Mozambique): the UCPM was activated on 20 March following a request for assistance. Nine EU MS teams responded through the UCPM of which five provided in-kind assistance including shelter and non-food items. To support the response also two EU Civil Protection teams were deployed to Mozambique together with four ERCC liaison officers and one European Centre for Disease Prevention and Control epidemiologist. In total more than 300 staff, including 180 doctors/nurses, were deployed. In addition to physical aid, analytical services in the form of 41 maps were also produced to assist the Mozambican authorities with the immediate response. 2020 Beirut explosions (Lebanon): After the devastating explosions in Beirut, the UCPM activation enabled the ERCC to coordinate the delivery of crisis response from 20 European countries. In the immediate aftermath, specialised search and rescue teams, chemical assessment experts, and medical personnel were dispatched, along with essential medical supplies. Additionally, within the first week, the ERCC oversaw the delivery of 17 tonnes of humanitarian aid, including medicines and medical equipment, to support the relief efforts.

Repatriation of EU citizens during the COVID-19 outbreak.

COVID-19 pandemic: In response to the COVID-19 crisis, the UCPM efficiently facilitated the repatriation of over 90,000 EU citizens globally. Additionally, through rescEU, it secured and distributed over 1.3 million protective masks, ventilators, PPE, therapeutics, and other vital supplies to bolster national health systems. The crisis has also led to a reinforced legal framework, enhancing preparedness for multi-country emergencies by enabling the European Commission to procure essential resources directly under rescEU, subject to specific conditions.

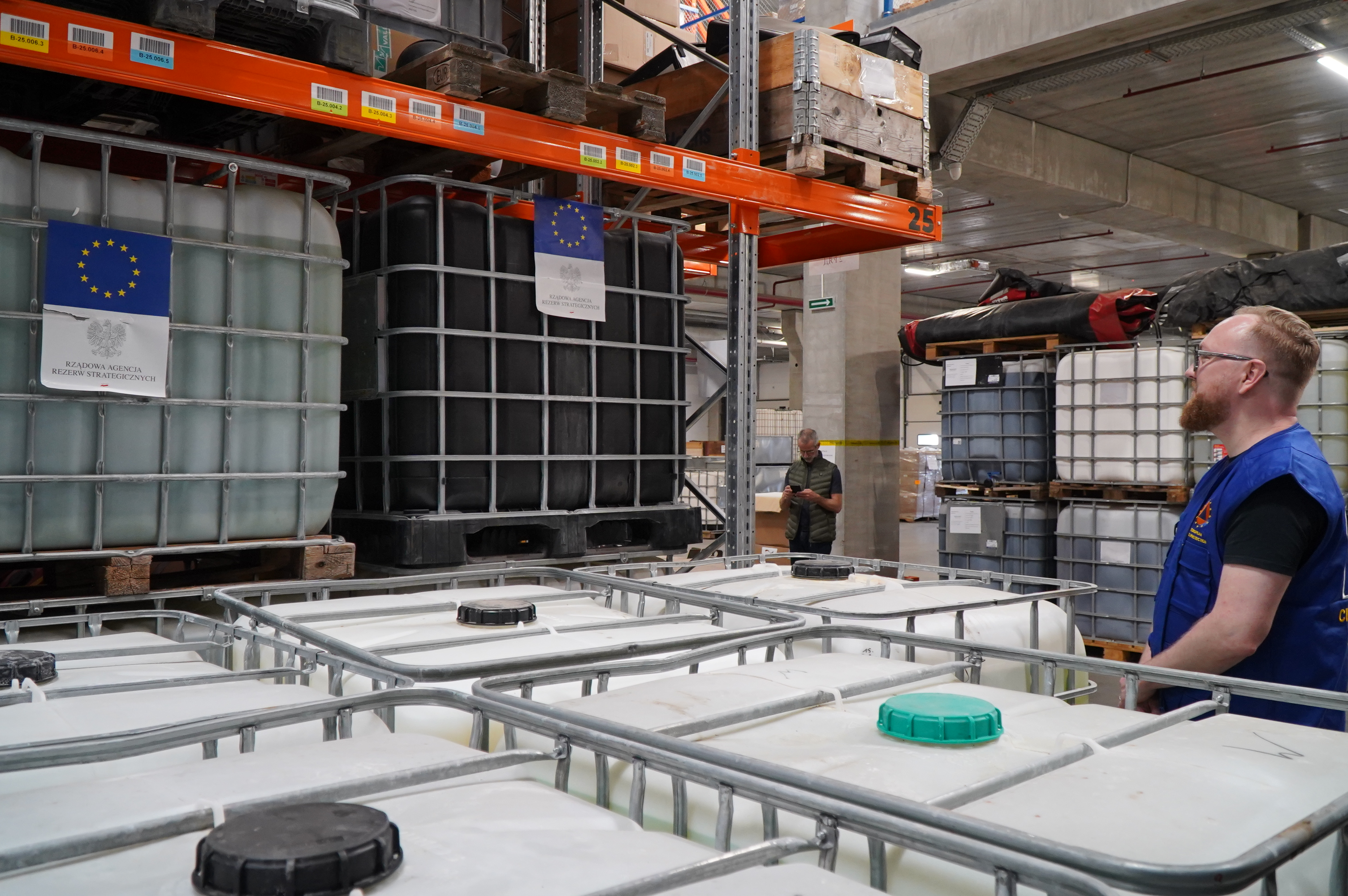
Ukraine: the largest-ever EU civil protection operation continues at full force.

2022 Russian invasion of Ukraine: Besides the 860 million euros in humanitarian aid, including food, water, essential household items, health care and psychosocial support, that has been allocated by European Commission, an additional 796 million EUR of in-kind assistance and emergency operations have been given via the UCPM. The latter includes 145,000 tons of aid, including power generators, medical equipment, temporary shelter units, water treatment stations and specialised equipment for public health risks such as chemical, biological and nuclear threats, as well as more than 2800 completed medevac operations as of June 2024. '''2023 Turkey–Syria earthquakes''': On 6 February, Turkey activated the UCPM following the devastating earthquake that cost the life of more than 54,000 people (48,448 in Turkey and ~6,000 in Syria). In total 23 UCPM participating states offered in-kind assistance, including more than 450,000 shelter items, 130,000 food and 46 million medicinal products. In the affected area that encompasses both countries, emergency medical technician (EMT) teams treated over 16,000 patients, and 101 individuals were successfully rescued by UCPM teams on the ground. 2025 wildfires in Europe: The 2025 wildfire season had the highest value of cumulative burnt areas ever recorded inside the EU since 2006, exceeding 1 million hectares according to the European Forest Fire Information System (EFFIS). As of September 4, 2025, the Union Civil Protection Mechanism (UCPM) has been activated 18 times by 11 different countries this year. The response has involved 58 aerial firefighting resources, including 38 airplanes and 20 helicopters, along with the deployment of over 760 personnel.

Besides responding to emergencies, the UCPM facilitates activities on prevention and preparedness to mitigate the effects of disasters. A training programme for civil protection experts from EU Member States and UCPM participating states ensures compatibility and complementary between intervention teams, while large-scale exercises train capacities for specific disasters each year. The EU supports and complements prevention and preparedness efforts of its Member States and participating states by focusing on areas where a joint European approach is more effective than separate national actions. These include risk assessments to identify disaster risks across the EU, encouraging research to promote disaster resilience and reinforcing early warning tools.

In addition, to cope with the changing disaster risk landscape, the European Commission, within the UCPM framework, has put forward a Recommendation and a Communication outlining five key objectives to enhance disaster resilience in civil protection. These objectives are: 1 - Anticipate, 2 - Prepare, 3 - Alert, 4 - Respond and 5 – Secure, collectively termed the ‘European Disaster Resilience Goals’. This initiative aims to strengthen the preparedness of European nations for natural hazards such as earthquakes, floods, and wildfires.

== Types of support ==
=== Advisory missions ===
Under the UCPM, the ERCC also organises advisory missions to offer tailor-made support and advice to better respond to the negative impacts of natural and human-induced hazards. Experts from EU Member States and UCPM participating states are deployed upon request from a national government or the UN to support authorities across the world.

In 2022, an advisory mission to Cuba was carried out within the context of a Disaster Preparedness Programme managed by United Nations Development Programme (UNDP) and World Food Program (WFP) called `Strengthening of national and local capacities for the comprehensive management of multiple risks in the event of disasters in order to reduce their impact on the most vulnerable population in Cuba’. Thirteen EU experts were deployed to train on search and rescue procedures in collapsed structures. An exercise was carried out simulating, in real time, the activation of a Cuban team that was deployed to a simulated earthquake. Search and rescue responders were able to put into practice all techniques and skills obtained during the training.

In 2023, seven EU experts were deployed for a Maritime Disaster Preparedness Advisory Mission to Sri Lanka. The mission was a follow-up to a UCPM activation by Sri Lanka in June 2021 to respond to the maritime disaster of the MS X-Press Pearl vessel catching fire.

=== Situational Awareness ===
To perform its monitoring information and coordination tasks, the ERCC can count on its Analytical Team to ensure continuous and comprehensive situational awareness to support the decision-making process. The Analytical Team builds the interface between the ERCC and the scientific community, maintaining the early warning system for natural disasters and managing the European Scientific Partnerships for natural and anthropogenic hazards, which provide 24/7 scientific advice.

==== Early information and warning services ====
The European Commission developed a number of early warning systems and services as part of its legal obligation stated in Regulation 836/2021 amending Decision 1313/2013/EU, establishing the Union Civil Protection Mechanism.

In particular, the ERCC uses on a daily basis mainly the following Early Warning and Information Systems developed under the Union Civil Protection Mechanism in close cooperation with the Joint Research Centre (JRC).

The Global Disaster Alert and Coordination System (GDACS). GDACS is a framework of cooperation between the United Nations and the European Commission to improve alerts, information exchange and coordination in the first phase after major sudden-onset disasters. Its Multi-Hazard Early Warning System component provides alerts and estimates the impacts of earthquakes, tsunamis, tropical cyclones, floods, volcanic activity, and droughts worldwide. Alerts reflect the possibility of a need for international assistance (i.e. red alerts indicate potentially severe disasters that might require international assistance). In addition, GDACS offers the following disaster information systems: GDACS Virtual On-Site Operations Coordination Centre (VOSOCC) and GDACS Satellite Mapping and Coordination System.

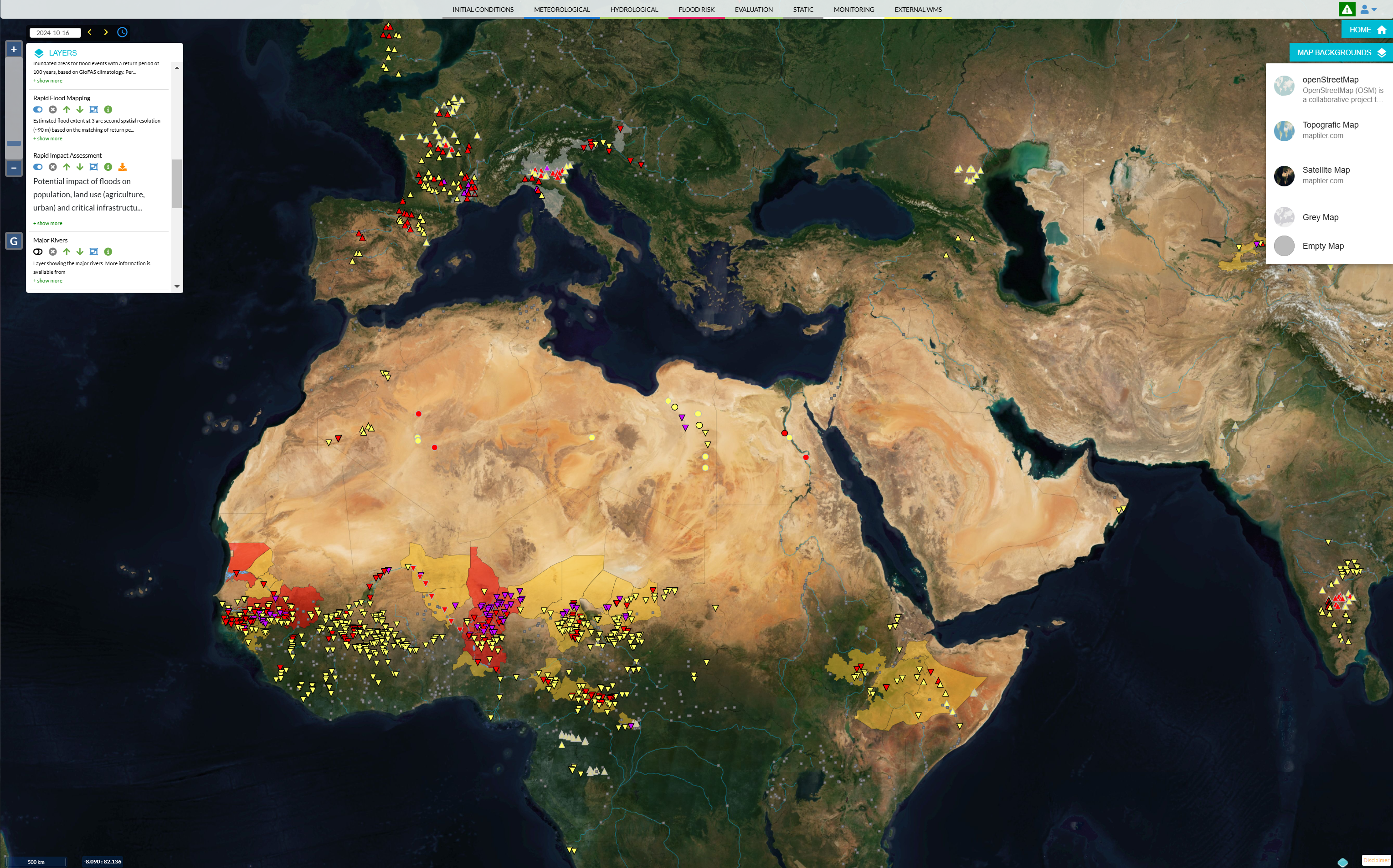
Global Flood Awareness System (GloFAS) viewer. Accessible here.

The European Flood Awareness System (EFAS) and the Global Flood Awareness System (GloFAS) are both part of the Copernicus Emergency Management Service (CEMS). They deliver comprehensive flood forecasting and monitoring, projecting potential flood events up to 10 days ahead to facilitate proactive measures in large transnational river basins. By integrating cutting-edge weather forecasts with advanced hydrological modelling, both systems offer daily flood forecasts, monthly seasonal streamflow outlooks, and a 30-day flood probability overview. These forecasts are generated by comparing EFAS/GloFAS simulation outputs with pre-determined flood thresholds for each grid cell, derived from discharge time series produced by the operational LISFLOOD hydrological model, using ERA5 forcing data from Copernicus. In addition to modelled data, GloFAS also incorporates the Global Flood Monitoring (GFM) product, which utilises satellite data obtained from Sentinel-1. This data is processed using a suite of flood detection algorithms to identify flooded areas directly. The Sentinel-1 mission consists of a constellation of two polar-orbiting satellites within the Copernicus program, which operate continuously, day and night. They are equipped with C-band synthetic aperture radar (SAR) capable of capturing images irrespective of weather conditions. These satellites have a revisit frequency, ensuring that any given location on Earth is imaged at least once every six days. Both EFAS and GloFAS were jointly developed by the European Commission and the European Centre for Medium-range Weather Forecast (ECMWF).

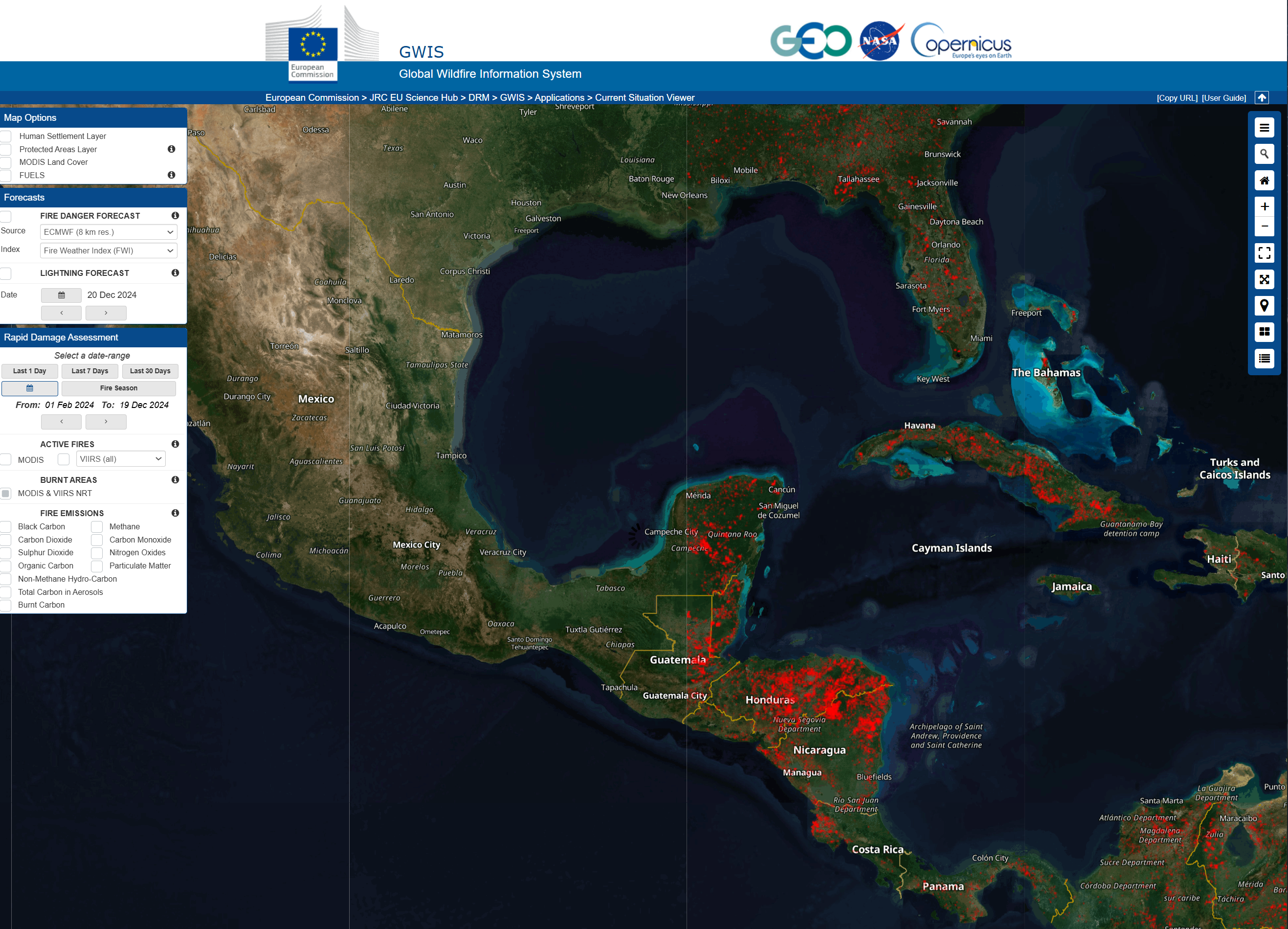
Global Wildfire Information System (GWIS). Accessible here

The European Forest Fire Information System (EFFIS) and Global Wildfire Information System (GWIS) forecast dangerous weather conditions up to 10 days ahead and provide near-real-time information on active fires and fire danger. Active fires are located based on so-called thermal anomalies in which the temperature of a potential fire is compared with the temperature of the land cover around it. The active fire detection is provided by the NASA Fire Information for Resource Management System (FIRMS) and produced by a combination of two satellite sensors: the MODIS sensor on board the Terra and Aqua satellites with 1 km resolution and the VIIRS sensor on board NASA/NOAA Suomi National Polar-orbiting Partnership (SNPP) with a resolution of 375 m. Fire danger is based on numerical weather predictions using meteorological forecast data received from the ECMWF. Additional information includes the burnt area, fire emissions and a global fuel map. These systems analyse the severity and risk that each forest fire poses for the local population and the environment. This allows informed decisions on the deployment of the rescEU firefighting capacity. GWIS is a joint initiative of the GEO and Copernicus Work Programs with support provided by NASA.

The European and Global Drought Observatories (EDO and GDO) give information on potential and ongoing droughts, including drought impact on agriculture, a heat wave index and meteorological indicators. Drought monitoring relies on a set of meteorological, representing different components in the hydrological cycle (precipitation, soil moisture, reservoir levels, river flow, groundwater levels) or specific impacts (vegetation stress). Precipitation index values, essential for drought assessment, are sourced from the ECMWF's seasonal forecast system (SEAS5). By conducting a statistical analysis of these values, the observatories can forecast unusually wet or dry conditions, thus serving as an early warning system for impending droughts and allowing for timely mitigation and planning measures.

==== Mapping services ====
Daily map on tropical cyclone Chido on 12 December 2024.

The ERCC Analytical team includes a mapping team composed of GIS experts that produces on-demand situational maps to support the analysis of situation related humanitarian and civil protection interventions or depict events that are expected to have humanitarian consequences.

The ERCC Analytical team produces the DG ECHO daily maps that are accessible via the ERCC portal. The DG ECHO daily maps give an overview of a significant event or situation of operational interest.

The ERCC is the 24/7 focal point for Copernicus Emergency Management service – An on-demand mapping component, enabling the CEMS authorised users to access to satellite maps within a few hours or days following an activation. The delivered maps help to assess the extent and impact of a disaster. For emergency management activities beyond the immediate response phase, the Risk and Recovery service can also be activated via the ERCC. This service covers all stages, including preparedness, disaster risk reduction, and recovery. Additionally, in case of situations other than natural hazards, the ERCC can access the Copernicus service that provides support to EU External and Security Actions (SESA) for security-related issues. These range from protecting EU citizens and managing crises and conflicts to ensuring environmental compliance and climate security. Finally, for acute marine pollution hazards such as oil spills, the ERCC can count on assistance given by the European Maritime Safety Agency (EMSA). The ERCC can request satellite images from their CleanSeaNet service. CleanSeaNet is the near real time European satellite-based oil spill monitoring, pollution alert and vessel detection service. The service provides rapid alerts on possible oil spills and related information after satellite acquisition and will automatically inform relevant authorities immediately upon detecting a spill with a potential source connected to it or in its vicinity. The service can be activated to request additional satellite acquisitions.

=== European scientific support ===
The ERCC Analytical Team, to bridge scientific community with operational community, established the European Scientific Partnership on Natural and Anthropogenic Hazards to complement the information coming from the automated early warning systems with a 24/7 scientific expert judgement.

- For natural hazards, the ERCC is supported by the ARISTOTLE consortium, which is a collective network of 24 European institutes with expertise in meteorology and geophysics. This consortium offers accurate and authoritative multi-hazard early warning services and expert analysis with a 24/7 response capacity. The services provided encompass continuous, thorough monitoring and reporting of ongoing and anticipated hazards, along with rapid on-demand expert analysis to in case a (severe) natural disaster strikes effectively.
- On radiological and nuclear hazards, the ERCC is supported by a consortium of five institutions with radiological, and nuclear hazard experts as well as meteorologists. It can provide a 24/7 technical and scientific support on radiological and nuclear events as emergency reporting. In addition, it monitors the nuclear situation in Ukraine to ECHO staff and acts as a back-office support for UCPM missions.

=== Reserves of EU capacities ===
==== RescEU ====
RescEU was established in 2019 as a reserve of European capacities, fully funded by the EU and, as of early 2024, an integral part of the ERCC. As of March 2024, the rescEU capacities include:

- A wildfire fleet consisting of 28 aeroplanes and 4 helicopters strategically stationed across 10 EU Member States.
- Medical capabilities, including a `Medevac’ capacity for highly infectious diseases’ patients: the Medevac capabilities have been used in the context of the war in Ukraine. Currently, a rescEU emergency medical team (EMT) is being developed with the aim of becoming the largest field hospital globally, providing a modular, highly specialised medical response to disasters.
- Emergency shelters to help people have a safe and secure place to live in the aftermath of a disaster or emergency. There are reserves of high-quality emergency shelter units such as light prefabricated structures, flat pack containers, and emergency tents across several countries, including a recent large expansion of reserves in Croatia, Poland, Slovenia, Spain, Sweden and Turkey.
- Transport and logistics capacities to increase the efficiency of transport of relief efforts, such as vaccines, personnel, and patients, including in contexts with high-security risks. The necessity for this was especially apparent during the COVID-19 pandemic, as a result of which at least two additional planes will be added for the transport of people, for example during consular evacuations and reparations, and cargo whenever needed.
- Chemical, biological, radiological, and nuclear (CBRN) reserves are currently being developed to face potential CBRN risks. These include decontamination as well as detection, sampling, identification and monitoring capacities. The decontamination capacities would boost the capacity of the EU to swiftly decontaminate infrastructure, vehicles, buildings, critical equipment and affected people, while the other services would be used to carry out search activities and respond to security events. Furthermore, Russia's war on Ukraine and the COVID-19 pandemic have further stressed the need for strategic stockpiles of accessible critical medical countermeasures, also including potassium iodide tablets and antidotes.
- Energy supply assets to ensure the UCPM is well equipped for future purposes. Its main task is to provide emergency backup power under different emergency scenarios. The rescEU energy reserve consists of thousands of generators of different sizes. These range from smaller sizes, capable of powering single households, to much larger models suitable for keeping public buildings and vital community services running such as hospitals and central heating points. In the context of Russia's war on Ukraine, rescEU has deployed thousands of generators to Ukraine, for instance, helping hospitals ensure basic services.

==== European Civil Protection Pool (ECPP) ====
The European Civil Protection Pool (ECPP), or in short `the Pool’, is a collection of emergency response teams and assets. While the rescEU capacities solely constitute material capacities, the ECPP also constitutes the capacity to rapidly deploy certified emergency teams. ECPP resources include various types of search and rescue teams, mobile laboratories, forest fire fighting capacities, emergency medical teams, water purification equipment and high-capacity pumping units.

Examples include deployed emergency medical teams during the Covid Pandemic (2020), urban search and rescue teams during the 2020 Beirut Explosion, firefighters and forest fire assessments teams during the 2023 Chile forest fires, flood rescue expert teams during the 2021 Belgium floods, as well as the deployment of water purification modules, medical teams and a remote piloted aerial system for the Tropical cyclone Batsirai in Madagascar (2022).

== See also ==
- Directorate-General for European Civil Protection and Humanitarian Aid Operations
- Global Disaster Alert and Coordination System
- United Nations Joint Logistics Centre

Copernicus resources (publicly accessible)

- Global Flood Awareness System (GloFAS) viewer
- Global Wildfire Information System (GWIS) viewer
- Global Drought Observatory (GDO) viewer
