= Hydrological Ensemble Prediction Experiment =

HEPEX is an international initiative bringing together hydrologists, meteorologists, researchers and endusers to develop advanced probabilistic hydrological forecast techniques for improved flood, drought and water management. HEPEX was launched in 2004 as an independent, cooperative international scientific activity. During the first meeting, the overarching goal was defined as

to develop and test procedures to produce reliable hydrological ensemble forecasts, and to demonstrate their utility in decision making related to the water, environmental and emergency management sectors

Key questions of HEPEX are:

- What adaptations are required for meteorological ensemble systems to be coupled with hydrological ensemble systems?
- How should the existing hydrological ensemble prediction systems be modified to account for all sources of uncertainty within a forecast?
- What is the best way for the user community to take advantage of ensemble forecasts and to make better decisions based on them?

The applications of Hydrological Ensemble Predictions span across large spatio-temporal scales ranging from short-term and very localized predictions to global climate change modeling.

HEPEX is organised around six major themes:

- Input and pre-processing
- Ensemble techniques and process modelling
- Data assimilation
- Post-processing
- Verification
- Communication and use in decision making

== Organisation of HEPEX ==
HEPEX is currently co-chaired by NOAA, the European Centre for Medium-Range Weather Forecast and the European Commission Joint Research Centre. Co-chairs are elected during plenary HEPEX meetings.

There is no formal membership for HEPEX. The HEPEX community is established through active participation of scientists, end users and decision makers in research, discussions and exchange of information on topics related to probabilistic hydrological predictions for floods, droughts, water management or related topics. The community has been very active with growing importance. Information on the initiative and the possibility to actively contribute to ongoing discussions can be found on the HEPEX website. HEPEX webinars can be followed online with the possibility to participate in the discussion. They are then transferred for online viewing here.

== See also ==
- European Flood Alert System - Probabilistic flood forecasting on European Scale
- HEPEX webinars
- European Centre for Medium-Range Weather Forecast
- NOAA
