= Erasmus Smith's Professor of Hebrew =

Professorship at Trinity College Dublin

The Erasmus Smith's Professor of Hebrew is a professorship at Trinity College Dublin. A lectureship in Oriental Languages had been founded in 1637 and later endowed by Erasmus Smith's estate in 1724. The endowment was increased in 1762 to create a Professorship in Oriental Languages. The title of the chair changed to Professor of Hebrew in 1849. The chair was elevated to a Regius Professorship in 1855 by Royal Statute. However, the Board of Trinity College did not issue a decree setting out the duties or salary of the Professorship and it was presumed that the Professorship did not actually exist until called into creation by decree. By 1878, the Board had postponed the regular creation of the Regius Professorship and the title reverted to Erasmus Smith's Professor of Hebrew.

== Succession of professors since 1762 ==
=== Erasmus Smith's Professors of Oriental Languages ===
- William Martin (1762)
- Christopher Hudson (1764)
- John Forsayeth (1764)
- William Hales (1782)
- Gerald Fitzgerald (1790)
- John Barrett (1806)
- Franc Sadleir (1822)
- Charles William Wall (1825)

=== Erasmus Smith's Professor of Hebrew ===
- James Henthorn Todd (1849)

=== Regius Professors of Hebrew ===
- James Henthorn Todd (1855)
- George Longfield (1869)

=== Erasmus Smith's Professors of Hebrew ===
- Joseph Carson (1878)
- Thomas Kingsmill Abbott (1879)
- George Wilkins (1900)
- Robert Gwynn (1920)
- Jacob Weingreen (1939)
- Andrew Mayes (1992)

== See also ==
- List of professorships at the University of Dublin
