= European Flood Awareness System =

European Commission initiative

The European Flood Awareness System is a European Commission initiative to increase preparedness for riverine floods across Europe.

The disastrous floods in Elbe and Danube rivers in 2002 confronted the European Commission with non-coherent flood warning information from different sources and of variable quality, complicating planning and organization of aid. In response to this event, the European Commission initiated the development of a European Flood Awareness System (EFAS) to increase the preparedness for floods in Europe. Following a Communication of the Commission in 2002 on the Elbe and Danube floods in 2002, the Joint Research Centre of the European Commission was assigned with the task to develop EFAS. Its development has been financially supported by DG GROW, DG ECHO, the European Parliament as well as Germany, the Czech Republic, Austria, Hungary and Slovakia through detachment of national experts.

The aim of EFAS is to gain time for preparedness measures before major flood events strike particularly for trans-national river basins both in the Member States as well as on European level. This is achieved by providing complementary, added value information to the National hydrological services and by keeping the European Response and Coordination Centre informed about ongoing floods and about the possibility of upcoming floods across Europe.

From 2005 to 2010 EFAS was tested in real-time mode, first with the National hydrological services and later also with the European Civil Protection. In 2011 EFAS became part of the Emergency Management Service of the COPERNICUS Initial Operations and in support to European Civil Protection. The operational components have been outsourced to Member State organisations. EFAS is running fully operational since autumn 2012.

== The operational EFAS ==
The European Flood Awareness System (EFAS) is the first operational European system monitoring and forecasting floods across Europe. It provides probabilistic, flood early warning information up to 10 days in advance to its partners – the National Hydrological Services and the European Response and Coordination Centre (ERCC).

The operational components of EFAS have been outsourced to different centres:

- EFAS hydrological data collection centre, outsourced to a Spanish consortium (Rediam and Soologic).
- EFAS meteorological data collection centre, outsourced to KISTERS AG and Deutscher Wetterdienst
- EFAS computational centre, outsourced to the European Centre for Medium-Range Weather Forecasts
- EFAS dissemination centre, outsourced to a consortium of hydro-meteorological services from Sweden, the Netherlands and Slovakia.

EFAS is running fully operational since October 2012 as a 7/365 service. The Central European flood event of June 2013 was the first big scale crisis during which the operational EFAS was actively reporting to the ERCC.

== History ==
Over the last decades severe fluvial floods of trans-national dimensions have taken place in Europe. There is evidence that in particular transboundary floods can be more severe in their magnitude, affect larger areas, result in higher death tolls, and cause more financial damage than non-shared river floods do. The European Environmental Agency estimated that floods in Europe between 1998 and 2002 caused about 700 deaths, the displacement of about half a million people and at least 25 billion Euros in insured economic losses (EEA, 2003). Some river basins suffered repeated flooding within a time span of a few years only – for example the Rhine and Meuse floods in 1993 and 1995 or the Po floods in 1994 and 2000.

The disastrous floods in the Elbe and Danube basin in summer 2002 acted as a wake-up call for the National Authorities as well as the European Commission to investigate new strategies for flood prevention and protection, with focus on co-ordinated actions among countries sharing the same river basin. Shortly after the 2002 floods, the European Commission announced in the communication COM(2002)-481 the development of a European Flood Awareness System (EFAS) (http://www.efas.eu). Since then, Europe has been hit by several major flood disasters such as the Elbe and Danube floods in 2006 and the Central European floods in 2010 affecting mostly Poland but also the Czech Republic, Austria, Hungary and Slovakia.

EFAS is part of a strategy for improved disaster management in Europe to reduce the impact of transnational floods through early warning. First of all, the aim of the system is to provide, useful, complementary and shared information on upcoming flood events to the national hydrological services. Furthermore, EFAS provides a unique and coherent overview on ongoing and forecast floods across Europe, which is needed for improved coordination of international civil protection actions on European scale during severe flood events.

== EFAS development steps ==
1999-2003: Research study. While EFFS was ongoing, Elbe and Danube were struck by widespread and devastating flooding in 2002. Since the hydrological model was set up for EFFS on European scale and the Deutscher Wetterdienst agreed to provide real-time weather forecasting data to the JRC during the event, the EFFS experimental set-up could be used to simulate the ongoing floods and how the flood waves could be expected to travel down the Danube river.

2003: Following the encouraging results of the ad hoc real-time test in 2002, the European Commission launched the development of a fully functioning European Flood Alert System (EFAS). The development was financially supported by the European Commission and the European Parliament. Furthermore, Austria, Czech Republic, Germany, Hungary, and Slovakia detached experts to assist the JRC with the building of such a system. The Deutscher Wetterdienst agreed to continue providing the JRC with historic and real time weather forecasts for setting up and testing of EFAS.

2004: Weather prediction more than a few days in advance is associated with a lot of uncertainty and in particular for rainfalls. In order to capture the possibility for extreme events correctly, ensemble prediction systems have been designed and multi-model approaches are desirable. Follow discussion (and contribute to the topic) on HEPEX. Therefore, in 2004 a collaboration agreement with ECMWF was signed, allowing the JRC to incorporate also ECMWF ensemble prediction data and its higher resolution deterministic forecast into EFAS in real-time. Technically, in 2004 only the deterministic forecast could be incorporated and the EPS only later in 2005.

2004: EFAS is adopted in the Danube Flood Action Plan. A dedicated EFAS-Danube is being established.

2005: An emerging European system for forecasting floods was viewed critically by the Member States as conflicting information to civil protection from different sources could lead to confusion and thus be counter-productive. Therefore, an EFAS partner network was established with clear dissemination and access rules. EFAS real time information was only to be distributed to partners having agreed to receive the data for testing purposes. EFAS real time information is not to be distributed to the public. EFAS partners were receiving annual training on the products and the system to understand the EFAS concepts, its strengths and weaknesses and were given the opportunity to discuss modifications to the development, visualisation, dissemination etc. During the 2005 Danube Alpine floods, EFAS distributed the first EFAS information reports to the EFAS partners. Since the EFAS network was still patchy, individual reports needed to be drafted for each partner on a daily basis, updates provided etc.

EFAS becomes a Hydrological Ensemble Prediction Experiment (HEPEX) testbed.

2007: Following requests from the partners, a dedicated EFAS web-interface was developed which allowed partners to access the data. By 2007 the EFAS partner network covered the majority of the trans-national rivers in continental Europe. Partners have access to EFAS through a dedicated username and password and could browse through the different information layers. Access to EFAS through the interface accelerated the development since more suggestions were put forward by the partner network.

2009: EFAS methodologies, set-up documented as well as first skill scores published. Furthermore, the 16 members of COSMO-LEPS have been integrated in EFAS as a dynamic downscaling of the ECMWF EPS during the first 5 days of leadtime.

2009-2012: During this time the JRC participated in an FP7 project called IMPRINTS on the development of an early warning indicator for flash floods. The results during IMPRINTS were reported regularly to the EFAS partners and eventually adopted for testing by the partner network. Since 2012, the flash flood layers are part of the EFAS as separate layers.

2010: The EFAS interface was made also available to the European Commission's Monitoring and Information Centre (MIC) which has become in 2013 the European Response and Coordination Centre (ERCC). Therefore, during the Central European Floods affecting mostly Poland, Czech Republic, Austria, Slovakia and Hungary, the MIC/ERCC was – for the first time – informed ahead in time of the possibility of major upcoming floods in several countries. When Poland activated the European Civil Protection mechanism, the MIC was prepared and could react without delay. The teams onsite could follow online the flood situation with an outlook for the coming days also for the neighbouring countries on one interface displaying comparable information, harmonised colour codes, English language, etc. This was a major step forward for the MIC/ERCC.

2011: EFAS was inserted into the Emergency Management Service of the EFAS is co-financed between DG GROW/COPERNICUS and DG ECHO.

2012: The operational centres start setting up the services. The transfer from the pre-operational system to operations was in October 2012.

2013: First stress test for the operational centres was in June 2013 with the Central European floods. The service worked smoothly throughout the period.

== EFAS partners and network ==
- The EFAS network consists of National Hydrological services and associated partners. Associated partners can be Civil Protection authorities which are associated to their National or Regional Hydrological Service.
- International Commission for the Protection of the River Danube (ICPDR). EFAS has been adopted as part of the Danube Flood Action Plan and had developed a stand-alone EFAS-Danube system. However, with the development of the EFAS information system, a dedicated EFAS Danube system became obsolete and has been fully integrated in the operational EFAS-IS. EFAS experts report regularly to ICPDR.

== EFAS concepts and tools ==
=== Ensemble Prediction Systems – key to longer flood warning times ===
Most hydrological services rely either on observations only or on short-term deterministic rainfall forecasts of up to two days or less because the high degree of uncertainty in weather forecasts at longer lead times. Since these uncertainties are also unpredictable, they render the results unreliable and therefore not useful for decision making. Since the last 10 years, however, the hydrological community is looking increasingly at the use of ensemble prediction systems (EPS) instead of single (deterministic) forecasts for flood warning times beyond 48 hours. EPS have already become an integral part of operational weather forecasts over the past years. They are designed to give a measure of the predictability of the weather and uncertainty in the model solution for lead times up to two weeks which would be considered well outside the range of predictability for deterministic models. The trend for implementing hydrological ensemble prediction systems in operational flood forecasting centres can clearly be seen in Europe.

EFAS uses multiple weather forecasts and EPS as input. Its forecasts are based on two deterministic, medium-range forecasts from the European Centre for Medium-Range Weather Forecasts (ECMWF) and the German Weather Service (DWD), (and thus different models) and on two sets of EPS: One from ECMWF which covers the medium-range up to 15 days globally (with a spatial resolution of ~30 km and 51 members, and one from the Consortium for Small-scale Modeling (COSMO), a limited area model EPS covering most of Europe with a shorter range up to 5 days (with a spatial resolution of 7 km and 16 members). The reason for using the shorter term EPS is to enhance the spread of EPS within the first few days and to have a finer grid information in particular for mountainous areas. This allows to better identify the location of the floods within the river basin. In a case study it has been demonstrated that using the eight global medium-range EPS available worldwide can provide a higher reliability for the results, but is computationally intensive.

=== LISFLOOD – the hydrological model for EFAS ===
The hydrological model used for EFAS is LISFLOOD. The model is a hybrid between a conceptual and a physical rainfall-runoff model combined with a routing module in the river channel. LISFLOOD has been specifically designed for large river catchments. A particular feature of LISFLOOD is its strong use of advanced Geographical Information System (GIS), in particular as a dynamic modelling framework.

=== Reducing false alarms – threshold exceedance and persistence ===
EFAS is providing information to the national hydrological services only when there is a danger that critical flood levels might be exceeded. In EFAS, the critical thresholds are needed at every grid point and therefore cannot be derived from observations. Instead, based on observed meteorological data, long-term discharge time series are calculated at each grid with the same LISFLOOD model parameterisation that is set up in the forecasting system. From these long-term simulations return periods are estimated – currently the 1-, 2-, 5- and 20-year return periods. All flood forecasts are compared against these thresholds – at every pixel – and the threshold exceedance calculated. Only when critical thresholds are exceeded persistently over several forecasts, information at these locations is produced, e.g. in the form of colour-coded overview maps or time series information at control points. The persistence criteria have been introduced to reduce the number of false alarms and focus on large fluvial floods caused mainly by widespread severe precipitation, combined rainfall with snow-melting or prolonged rainfalls of medium intensity.

=== Verification ===
Forecast verification is important to understand the strength and weaknesses of the system and to build confidence in its results. For EFAS two types of verifications are applied. The first one is event-based – for each flood alert the hit, false alarm and misses are assessed. If a flood alert has been sent but no flooding was observed, a false alarm is counted. If somewhere in the basin flooding has been report, a hit it counted. If flooding has been reported for which an alert was not sent (even if the system itself simulated an event), a missed event is counted. The events are assessed through feedback reports and media throughout the year and reported during the EFAS annual meeting. In addition to the event-based verification, also skill scores are computed including Brier Skill Score, Root Mean Square Error, Nash-Sutcliffe efficiency coefficient, continuous rank probability score, etc. These are reported regularly in the EFAS bulletins and in publications. Skill analysis has been reported for example at the European Geosciences Union More on skill scores can be found on HEPEX. The specific verification tool box for hydrological ensemble prediction has also been tested for EFAS.

== Links to other projects and initiatives ==
=== Hydrological Ensemble Prediction Experiment (HEPEX) ===
HEPEX was founded in 2004 with NOAA and ECMWF as co-chairs. It is an international research initiative with the aim to "demonstrate the added value of hydrological ensemble predictions (HEPS) for emergency management and water resources sectors to make decisions that have important consequences for economy, public health and safety." HEPEX is organised around six major themes, i) Input and pre-processing, ii) Ensemble techniques and process modelling, iii) Data assimilation, iv) Post-processing, v) Verification and vi) Communication and use in decision making. More information on HEPEX and the possibility to participate in discussions can be found on the HEPEX website. HEPEX is holding webinars which can be followed online with the possibility to ask question and participate in the discussion. HEPEXwebinars are transferred for online viewing on YouTube.

=== Global Flood Awareness System ===
Using similar concepts developed for the continental EFAS, a Global Flood Awareness System (GloFAS) is being developed in collaboration between ECMWF, the JRC and other contributing research organisations. GloFAS has become fully operational as part of the Copernicus Emergency Management Service in April 2018.

GloFAS is part of the Global Flood Working Group.

=== Research Projects ===
EFAS has benefitted from the following research projects

- European Flood Forecasting System (FP6 project)
- FloodSite
- EuroRisk/Preview
- Safer
- IMPRINTS
- KultuRisk

== Relevant EU policies ==
- Regulation (EU) No 911/2010 n the European Earth monitoring programme (GMES) and its initial operations (2011 to 2013)
- A Union Civil Protection Mechanism
- COM(2002)481 THE EUROPEAN COMMUNITY RESPONSE TO THE FLOODING IN AUSTRIA, GERMANY AND SEVERAL APPLICANT COUNTRIES
- COM (2013) 216 Strategy for adaptation to climate change

== Publications on EFAS ==
- EFAS publishes bi-monthly bulletins with information on the hydro-meteorological situation of Europe, specific events and skill scores on the EFAS system.
- Raynaud, D., Thielen, J., Salamon, P., Burek, P., Anquetin, S. and Alfieri, L. (2014), A dynamic runoff co-efficient to improve flash flood early warning in Europe: evaluation on the 2013 central European floods in Germany. Meteorological Applications doi: 10.1002/met.1469
- Alfieri, L., Pappenberger, F., Wetterhall, F., Haiden, T., Richardson, D. and Salamon, P. (2014) Evaluation of ensemble streamflow predictions in Europe, Journal of Hydrology, 517, 913–922, doi:10.1016/j.jhydrol.2014.06.035, 2014.
- F. Pappenberger, Stephens E., Thielen, J., Salamon, P., Demeritt, D., van Andel, S.J., Wetterhall, F., Alfieri, L.,(2013) Visualising probabilistic flood forecast information: expert preferences and perceptions of best practice in uncertainty communication, Hydrological Processes, Special Issue, Hydrological Ensemble Prediction Systems (HEPS), Volume 27, Issue 1, pages 132–146,
- Burek P, Thielen Del Pozo J, Thiemig V, De Roo A. Das Europäische Hochwasser-Frühwarnsystem (EFAS). Korrespondenz Wasserwirtschaft 4/11; 2011.
- Pappenberger F, Thielen Del Pozo J, Del Medico M. The impact of weather forecast improvements on large scale hydrology: analysing a decade of forecasts of the European Flood Alert System. HYDROLOGICAL PROCESSES 25 (7); 2011. p. 1091–1113. JRC55592
- Pappenberger F, Thielen Del Pozo J, Del Medico M. The impact of weather forecast improvements on large scale hydrology: analysing a decade of forecasts of the European Flood Alert System. HYDROLOGICAL PROCESSES 25 (7); 2011. p. 1091–1113. JRC55592
- Thielen J., Bartholmes J., Ramos M.-H, de Roo A. (2009) The European Flood Alert System – Part 1: Concept and development, Hydro. Earth Syst. Sci., 13, 125-140
- J. C. Bartholmes, J. Thielen, M. H. Ramos, and S. Gentilini (2009) The European Flood Alert System EFAS – Part 2: Statistical skill assessment of probabilistic and deterministic operational forecasts, Hydrol. Earth Syst. Sci., 13, 141–153
- M.-H. Ramos, J. Thielen and A. de Roo (2009) Prévision hydrologique d'ensemble et alerte avec le système européen d'alerte aux crues (EFAS) : cas des crues du bassin du Danube en août 2005, TRAITÉ D’HYDRAULIQUE ENVIRONNEMENTALE; de la goutte de pluie jusqu’à la mer, Ed. (J.-M. Tanguy), HERMES, Vol. 7., HERMES, Lavoisier,
- Cloke H., Thielen J., Pappenberger F., Nobert S., Balint G., Edlund C., Koistinen A., de Saint-Aubin C., Sprokkereef E., Viel C., Salamon P., and Buizza R. (2009) Progress in the implementation of Hydrological Ensemble Prediction Systems (HEPS) in Europe for operational flood forecasting; ECMWF Newsletter, Autumn 2009, 121, 20-24
- R. Buizza, F. Pappenberger, P. Salamon, J. Thielen and A. de Roo (2009). EPS/EFAS probabilistic flood prediction for Northern Italy: the case of 30 April 2009 ECMWF Newsletter No. 120 – Summer 2009, p 10-16
- Pappenberger F, Bartholmes J, Thielen J, CLOKE HL, Buizza R, de Roo A (2008) New dimensions in early flood warning across the globe using grand-ensemble weather predictions. Geophysical Research Letters. 35, L10404, doi:10.1029/2008GL033837
- Younis J., M.-H. Ramos and J. Thielen (2008) EFAS forecasts for the March–April 2006 flood in the Czech part of the Elbe River Basin – a case study, Atmos. Sci. Let. 9:88-94
- Bartholmes, J., Thielen J., and Kalas M. (2008) "Forecasting medium-range flood hazard on European scale", Georisk Vol.2, No.4, December 2008, 0-00
- Kalas, M., Ramos, M.-H., Thielen, J., Babiakova, G. (2008) Evaluation of the medium-range European flood forecasts for the March–April 2006 flood in the Morava River, J. Hydrol. Hydromech J. Hydrol. Hydromech, 56, 2008, 2,
- Ramos, M.-H., Bartholmes, J., Thielen-del Pozo, J. (2007) Development of decision support products based on ensemble forecasts in the European flood alert system, Atmospheric Science Letters 8 (4), pp. 113–119
- Demeritt, D., Cloke, H., Pappenberger, F., Thielen, J., Bartholmes, J., Ramos, M.-H. (2007) Ensemble predictions and perceptions of risk, uncertainty, and error in flood forecasting, Environmental Hazards 7 (2), pp. 115–127
- Gouweleeuw B.T., Thielen, J., Franchello G., de Roo APJ., Buizza R. (2005) Flood forecasting using medium-range probabilistic weather prediction, Hydrology and Earth System Sciences, 9(4), 365-380
