= John Forsayeth =

Irish religious figure

John Forsayeth (15 July 1736 – 17 April 1785) was Archdeacon of Cork from 1782 until his death.

Forsayeth was born in County Cork and educated at Trinity College, Dublin, where he became a Fellow in 1762 and Professor of Hebrew in 1764. He served a curacy at St Peter, Cork. After that, he held the college living at Rahy and Clondahorky and the accompanying Prebend at Raphoe Cathedral. In 1782 he became the incumbent at Dunisky.
