= Keith Shine =

British meteorologist and professor (born 1958)

Keith Shine FRS
- Born: 19 April 1958 (age 68); Birmingham, England
- Scientific career
- Fields: meteorology and climate science
- Workplaces: University of Reading
- Thesis: Some development of a zonally averaged climate model (1981)
- Doctoral advisor: Bob Harwood
- Doctoral students: Piers Forster
- Website: www.reading.ac.uk/search/search-staff-details.aspx?id=180

Keith Peter Shine (born 19 April 1958) FRS is the Regius Professor of Meteorology and Climate Science at the University of Reading. He is the first holder of this post, which was awarded to the university by Queen Elizabeth II to mark her Diamond Jubilee.

== Education ==
Shine was educated at Halesowen Grammar School and Imperial College London where he was awarded a Bachelor of Science degree in Physics in 1978. He completed his postgraduate education at the University of Edinburgh, where he was awarded a PhD in meteorology in 1981 for research supervised by Bob Harwood. He now teaches atmospheric physics to second year students at the University of Reading.

== Research ==
Shine's research interests are in meteorology and climate science, with a focus on understanding how human activity initiates climate change. He has also investigated the role played by water vapour in the Earth's energy budget, which considers the energy flows both into and away from the Earth in the form of shortwave radiation from the Sun and outgoing longwave radiation from the Earth and its atmosphere, respectively.

In addition, Shine is at the forefront of identifying and quantifying radiative forcing, a way of measuring the strength of climate change mechanisms. He has been heavily involved in major United Nations' assessments of climate change and stratospheric ozone depletion, and was a lead author of the Intergovernmental Panel on Climate Change (IPCC) 1995 IPCC Second Assessment Report.

Prior to working at Reading in 1988, he held postdoctoral research posts at the University of Liverpool and University of Oxford.

== Awards and honours ==
Shine was elected a Fellow of the Royal Society (FRS) in 2009.
