= Regius Professor =

University professor with royal patronage or appointment in UK and Ireland

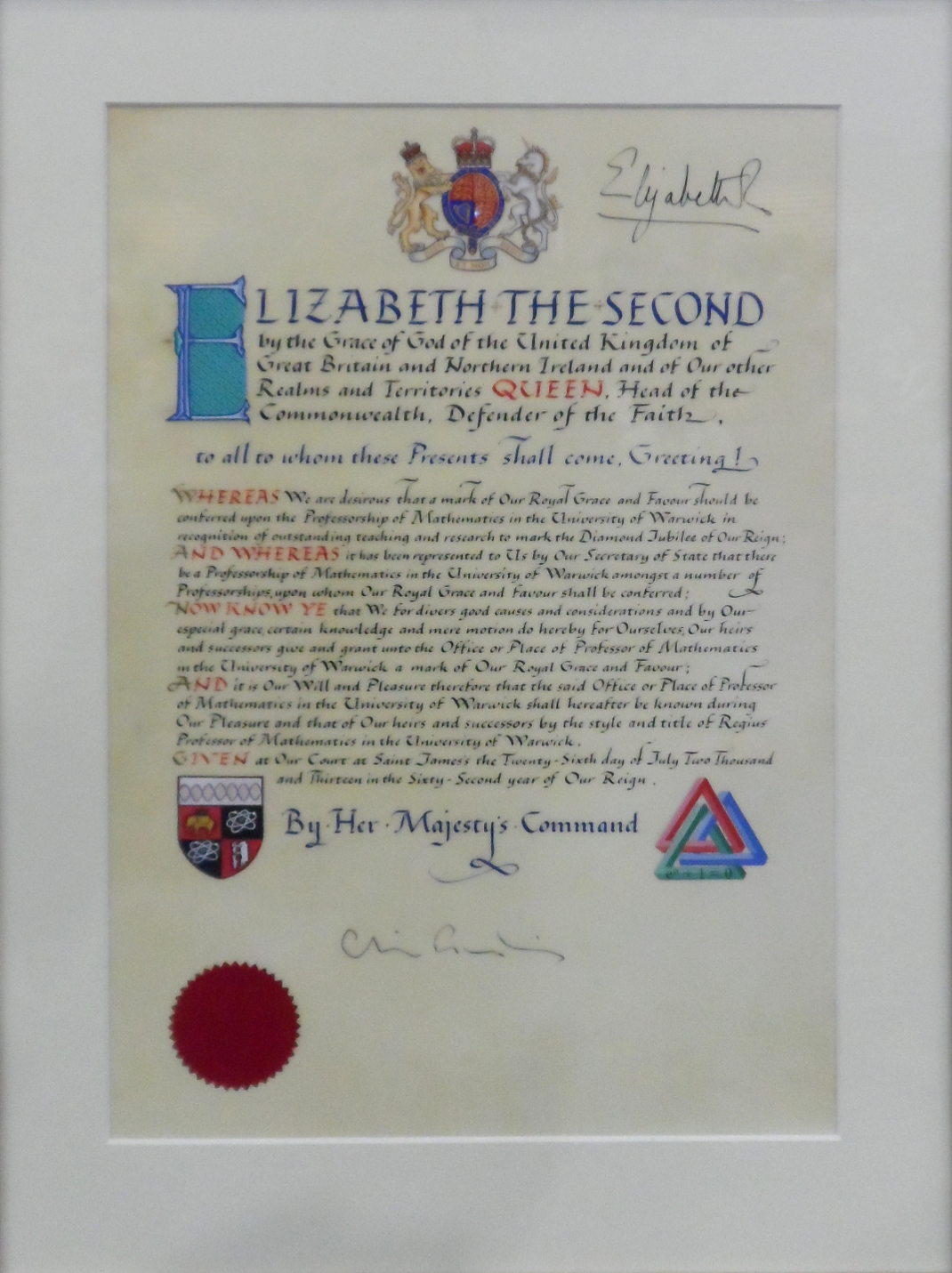
Royal warrant creating a Regius Chair in Mathematics at the University of Warwick (2013)

A Regius Professor is a university professor in the United Kingdom or Ireland whose chair (professorship) has, or originally had, royal patronage or appointment. The first Regius Professorship was in the field of medicine, and was founded by the Scottish King James IV at the University of Aberdeen in 1497. Regius chairs have since been instituted in various universities, in disciplines judged to be fundamental and for which there is a continuing and significant need. Each was established by an English, Scottish, or British monarch. As of 2026, there are 85 active Regius Professorships. Following proper advertisement and interview through the offices of the university and the national government, the current monarch still appoints the professor (except for those at Trinity College Dublin in Ireland, which left the United Kingdom in 1922). This royal imprimatur, and the relative rarity of these professorships, means a Regius chair is prestigious and highly sought after.

Regius Professors are traditionally addressed as "Regius" and not "Professor". The University of Glasgow currently has the highest number of extant Regius chairs, at fourteen.

Historically, Regius Chairs only existed in the seven ancient universities of the UK and Ireland. In October 2012 it was announced that Queen Elizabeth II would create up to six new Regius Professorships, to be announced in early 2013, to mark her Diamond Jubilee. In January 2013 the full list was announced, comprising twelve new chairs, probably the largest number ever created in one year, and more than created in most centuries. In July 2015 it was announced that further Regius Professorships would be created to mark the Queen's 90th birthday.

== University of Aberdeen ==
- Regius Professor of Anatomy (1863)
- Regius Professor of Botany
- Regius Professor of English Literature (1894)
- Regius Professor of Greek (abolished and merged into the Chair of Humanity in 1979)
- Regius Professor of Humanity, formerly Regius Professor of Classics
- Regius Professor of Logic (1860)
- Regius Professor of Mathematics (1703)
- Regius Professor of Medicine, formerly Regius Professor of Materia Medica (1858)
- Regius Professor of Moral Philosophy
- Regius Professor of Natural History
- Regius Professor of Obstetrics and Gynaecology, formerly Regius Professor of Midwifery (1858)
- Regius Professor of Pathology (1882)
- Regius Professor of Physiology (1858)
- Regius Professor of Surgery (1839)

== Aston University ==
- Regius Professor of Pharmacy (2016)

== University of Cambridge ==
- Regius Professor of Botany (1724/2009)
- Regius Professor of Civil Law (1540)
- Regius Professor of Divinity (1540)
- Regius Professor of Engineering (2011)
- Regius Professor of Greek (1540)
- Regius Professor of Hebrew (1540)
- Regius Professor of History (1724)
- Regius Professor of Physic (1540)

== Cardiff University ==
- Regius Professor of Chemistry (2016)

== Trinity College Dublin ==
- Regius Professor of Divinity (1600/1761)
- Regius Professor of Physic (1637?)
- Regius Professor of Hebrew (1637/1762/1855)
- Regius Professor of Laws (1668)
- Regius Professor of Feudal and English Law (1761–1934)
- Regius Professor of Greek (1761)
- Regius Professor of Surgery (1852/1868)

== University of Dundee ==
- Regius Professor of Life Sciences (2013)

== University of Edinburgh ==
- Regius Professor of Public Law and the Law of Nature and Nations (1707)
- Regius Professor of Rhetoric and English Literature (1762)
- Regius Professor of Astronomy (1785)
- Regius Professor of Clinical Surgery (1803)
- Regius Professor of Medical Science
- Regius Professor of Forensic Medicine (1807)
- Regius Professor of Sanskrit (1862) (now the Regius Professor of South Asian Language, Culture and Society)
- Regius Professor of Engineering (1868)
- Regius Professor of Geology (1871)
- Regius Chair of Plant Science

The first Professor of Greek (1708) at Edinburgh, Wiliam Scott Primus, was referred to with the honorific 'Regius Professor' but was, ultimately, unable to secure a grant from the Crown. However, both of the inaugural professors of Greek and Humanity at Edinburgh were appointed by Royal Warrant.

== University of Essex ==
- Regius Professor of Political Science (2013)

== University of Glasgow ==
- Regius Professor of Medicine and Therapeutics (1637/1713)
- Regius Professor of Materia Medica (1831–1989) (merged with the Regius chair in Medicine and Therapeutics)
- Regius Professor of Law (1713)
- Regius Professor of Anatomy (1718)
- Regius Professor of Astronomy (1760)
- Regius Professor of Zoology (1807)
- Regius Professor of Obstetrics and Gynaecology (1815)
- Regius Professor of Surgery (1815)
- Regius Professor of Chemistry (1817)
- Regius Professor of Botany (1818)
- Regius Professor of Forensic Medicine (1839)
- Regius Professor of Physiology (1839)
- Regius Professor of Civil Engineering and Mechanics (1840)
- Regius Professor of English Language and Literature (1861)
- Regius Professor of Ecclesiastical History (1716–1935) (ceased being a Regius chair in 1935)
- Regius Professor of Precision Medicine (2016)
- Regius Professor of Law (2012)

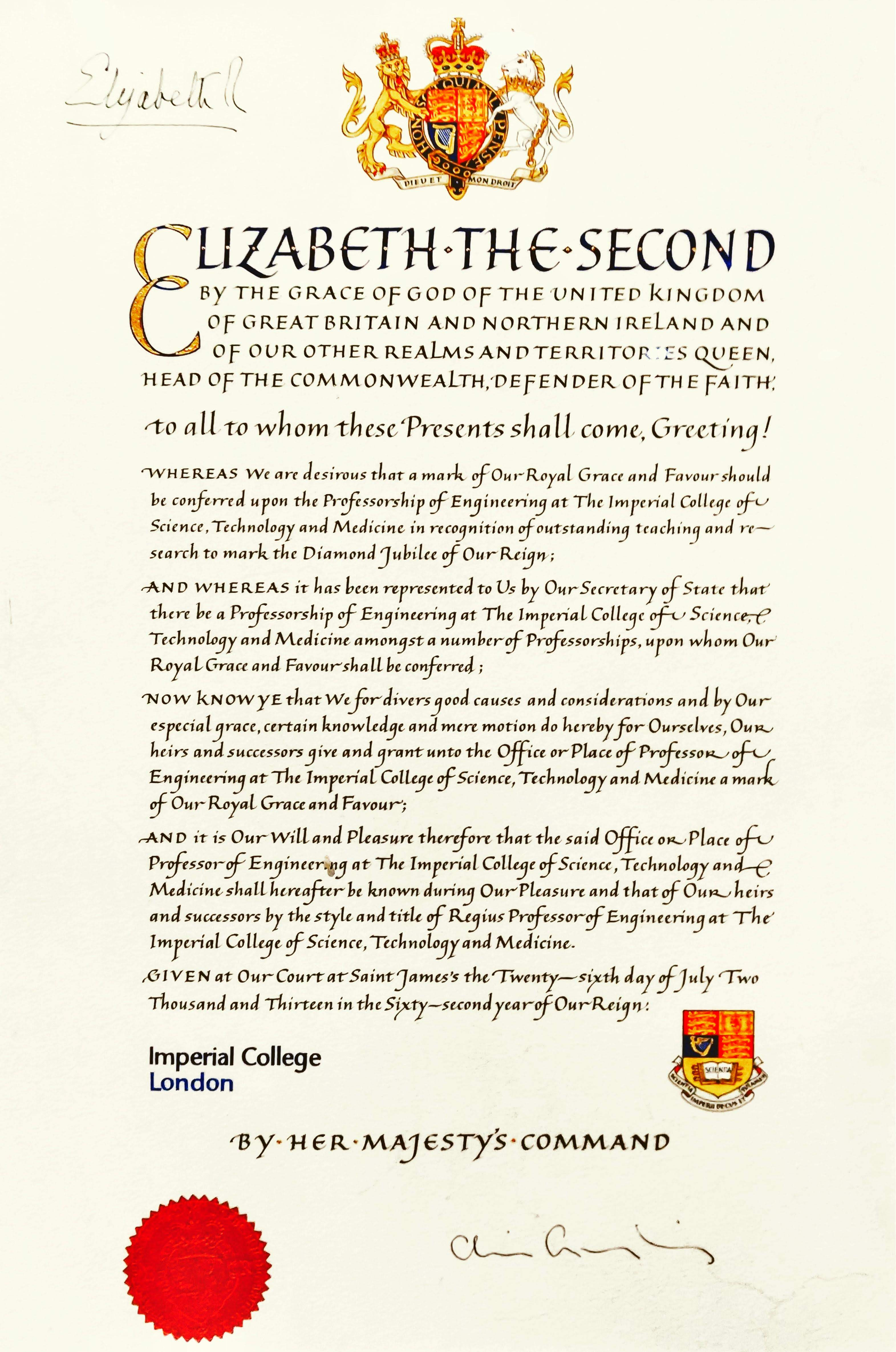
Regius Professor of Engineering at Imperial College London

== Imperial College of Science, Technology and Medicine ==
- Regius Professor of Engineering (2013)
- Regius Professor of Infectious Disease (2016)

== University of Liverpool ==
- Regius Professor of Chemistry (2016)

== University of London ==
- Regius Professor of Cancer Research (2016) (Based at The Institute of Cancer Research)
- Regius Professor of Psychiatry (2013) (Based at King's College London)
- Regius Professor of Economics (2013) (Based at LSE)

== University of Manchester ==
- Regius Professor of Physics (2013)
- Regius Professor of Materials (2016)

== Newcastle University ==
- Regius Professor of Ageing (2016)

== The Open University ==
- Regius Professor of Open Education (2013)

== University of Oxford ==
- Regius Professor of Civil Law (c.1540)
- Regius Professor of Divinity (1535)
- Regius Professor of Moral and Pastoral Theology (1842)
- Regius Professor of Ecclesiastical History (1842)
- Regius Professor of Hebrew (1546)
- Regius Professor of Medicine (1546)
- Regius Professor of Greek (c.1541)
- Regius Professor of History (1724)
- Regius Professor of Mathematics (2016)

== Queen's University Belfast ==
- Regius Professor of Electronics & Computer Engineering (2016)

== University of Reading ==
- Regius Professor of Meteorology and Climate Science (2013)

== Royal Holloway, University of London ==
- Regius Professor of Music (2013)

== University of St Andrews ==
- Regius Professor of Mathematics (1668)

== University of Southampton ==
- Regius Professor of Computer Science (2013)
- Regius Professorship in Ocean Sciences (2016)

== University of Surrey ==
- Regius Professor of Electronic Engineering (2013)

== University of Warwick ==
- Regius Professor of Mathematics (2013)
- Regius Professor of Manufacturing (2016)
