= Regius Professor of Surgery (Dublin) =

The Regius Professor of Surgery is a Regius Professorship held at Trinity College Dublin. The chair was created as University Professor of Surgery in 1852, and was made a Regius Professorship by Queen Victoria in 1868. It is not currently occupied.

== Holders ==
=== University Professor of Surgery ===
- James William Cusack (1852)
- Robert Adams (1861)

=== Regius Professor of Surgery ===
- Robert Adams (1868)
- William Colles (1875)
- Sir George Porter, 1st Baronet (1891)
- Sir Charles Ball, 1st Baronet (1895)
- Edward Henry Taylor (1916)
- William Taylor (1922)
- Sir Charles Ball, 2nd Baronet (1933)
- Adams Andrew McConnell (1946)
- John Seton Pringle (1961)
- Nigel Kinnear (1967)
- Stanley McCollum (1973)
- Thomas P.J. Hennessy (1984)
