= List of Trinity College Dublin people =

This is a list of notable alumni and faculty members of Trinity College Dublin.

== Armed forces ==
- Tom Clonan, retired Irish Army officer, author and security analyst
- Eyre Coote (1762–1823), Irish British Army soldier and politician; Governor-General of Jamaica (1806–1808)
- Henry George Gore-Browne (1830–1912), Irish British Army colonial of the 100th Regiment of Foot; awarded the Victoria Cross (circa 1857, while a captain of the 32nd Regiment of Foot)
- James Murray Irwin (1858–1938), Irish British Army major-general doctor
- Col. Ernest Achey Loftus, CBE, soldier, teacher and diarist
- Michael Lynch, MMG (1942–2008), Irish Army officer and recipient of the Military Medal for Gallantry
- Robert Nairac (1948–1977), English British Army captain; abducted and killed by the Provisional Irish Republican Army in 1977; posthumously awarded the George Cross (1979)
- Robert Ross (1766–1814), Anglo-Irish British Army officer; participated in the Napoleonic Wars (various ranks); commander of the British force which sacked Washington, D.C., and burned down the White House, during the War of 1812 (as major-general)
- Sir Hovenden Walker (1656/1666–1725/1728), Royal Navy officer

== Arts ==
- Lenny Abrahamson, Oscar-nominated film director
- Thomas Bateson, 17th-century writer of madrigals
- Aisling Bea, actress and comedian
- Cathy Belton, actress
- John Butler Yeats, artist
- David Benioff, filmmaker and co-creator of Game of Thrones
- Frank Blake, actor
- Michael Bogdanov, theatre director
- Cameron Cuffe, actor
- Siobhán Cullen, actress
- Sammy Copley, singer and musician
- Derbhle Crotty, actress
- Brian Boydell, composer
- Selina Cartmell, theatre director, and director of the Gate Theatre
- Michael Colgan, director of the Gate Theatre, film and television producer
- Ella Lily Hyland, actress
- Houston Collisson, musician
- Anne Crookshank, emeritus professor of the history of art and founder of the faculty
- Chris de Burgh, singer and musician
- Thomas Manly Deane, architect
- Pádraic Delaney, actor
- Donnacha Dennehy, composer
- Zara Devlin, actress
- Vanessa Emme, actress
- Ciarán Farrell, composer
- Hilda Fay, actress
- Margaret Fiedler, musician and singer
- Susan Fitzgerald, actress
- Kwaku Fortune, actor and writer
- Percy French, songwriter and entertainer
- Tana French, crime writer and actress
- Danielle Galligan, actress
- Jack Gleeson, actor
- Constantine Gregory, actor
- Gillian Greer, playwright
- Lisa Hannigan, singer
- Éanna Hardwicke, actor (IFTA winner and BAFTA nominated)
- Nancy Harris, playwright
- Aaron Heffernan, actor
- Rachael Hegarty, poet
- Ciaran Hope, composer of orchestral, choral, and film music
- Andrew Hozier-Byrne, singer-songwriter (did not finish course)
- Ella Lily Hyland, actor
- Jordanne Jones, actor
- Fergus Johnston, composer
- Lauren-Shannon Jones, playwright
- Dillie Keane, singer-songwriter and actress
- Rory Keenan, actor
- Emmet Kirwan, actor and writer
- Lisa Lambe, actress and singer
- Nathaniel Lande, author, filmmaker and former creative director of Time
- Jacknife Lee, record producer
- Allen Leech, actor
- Damien Leith, singer
- Clinton Liberty, actor
- Róisín McBrinn, artistic director of the Gate Theatre
- Eleanor McEvoy, singer-songwriter
- Katie McGrath, actress
- Sean Pol McGreevy, actor/musician
- Paul McGuinness, manager of U2
- Stephanie McKeon, actress
- Pauline McLynn, actress, comedian and novelist
- Katie McMahon, singer and musician
- Patrick Martins, actor
- Paul Mescal, actor (Oscar nominated and BAFTA winner)
- Justine Mitchell, actress
- Alex Murphy, actor
- Tadhg Murphy, actor
- Erica Murray, playwright
- Ruth Negga, actress
- Jonathon Ng, musician
- Méav Ní Mhaolchatha, singer
- Sylvia O'Brien, opera singer
- Brían F. O'Byrne, actor
- Ciara O'Callaghan, actress
- Agnes O'Casey, actress
- Ruairi O'Connor, actor
- Hugh O'Conor, actor
- David O'Doherty, comedian
- Alison Oliver, actor
- Jason O'Mara, actor
- Rebecca O'Mara, actress
- Matthew Pilkington, satirist and art historian
- Laura Pyper, actress
- David Rawle, actor
- Norman Rodway, actor
- James Edward Rogers, architect and artist
- Andrew Scott, actor
- Chris Singleton, singer-songwriter and producer
- Max Stafford-Clark, theatre director
- Emily Taaffe, actress
- Rhys Thomas, film and television director
- Stanley Townsend, actor
- Tom Vaughan-Lawlor, actor
- Eileen Walsh, actress
- D. B. Weiss, novelist and co-creator of Game of Thrones
- Garret Wesley, 1st Earl of Mornington, composer, father of the Duke of Wellington
- Dominic West, British actor
- Ian Whitcomb, singer and entertainer
- James White, historical novelist

== Broadcasting and journalism ==
- Bruce Arnold, journalist and author
- Sharon Ní Bheoláin, news presenter
- James David Bourchier, Balkans correspondent for The Times and advisor to Tzar Ferdinand of Bulgaria
- John Bowman, journalist and broadcaster
- Rory Carroll, US West Coast correspondent, The Guardian
- Tony Connelly, Europe Editor, RTÉ
- Crosaire (J. D. Crozier), B.A. Dubl 1940, compiled the cryptic crossword for The Irish Times for fifty-nine years
- Ray D'Arcy, television and radio presenter
- Joe Duffy, radio presenter
- Maia Dunphy, broadcaster
- Ken Early, soccer journalist
- Robert Fisk, journalist
- Douglas Gageby, editor of the Irish Times
- Veronica Guerin, crime reporter
- Charles Graham Halpine, journalist
- Vincent Hanna, Northern Irish television journalist
- Brian Inglis, journalist, historian and television presenter
- Mary Jordan, Pulitzer Prize-winning journalist
- Aine Lawlor, radio and television presenter
- Quentin Letts, British columnist and theatre critic
- Martyn Lewis, British newsreader and journalist
- Mark Little, journalist
- Alex Massie, freelance journalist
- David McWilliams, writer and broadcaster on economic and social issues
- Denis Murray OBE former BBC Ireland Correspondent.
- Edmund O'Donovan, war correspondent
- Rupert Pennant-Rea, former editor of The Economist
- Gerry Ryan, radio presenter
- Cliff Taylor, editor, Sunday Business Post
- Nick Webb, Business Editor, Sunday Independent

== Business ==
- Conrad Burke, physicist and entrepreneur
- Paul Coulson
- Olivia Grosvenor, Duchess of Westminster, senior account manager
- Lord Haskins of Skidby, chairman of Northern Foods
- Alan Joyce, chief executive of Qantas
- Laura Magahy, company director and former director of Sláintecare
- Dermot Mannion, former chief executive of Aer Lingus
- Michael O'Leary, chief executive of Ryanair
- Willie Walsh, chief executive of British Airways

== Economics ==
- Sean Barrett, economist and member of Seanad Éireann
- Peter Bellew, chief executive of Malaysia Airlines
- Phelim Boyle (born 1941), academic and economist; pioneer of the use of Monte Carlo methods in derivatives pricing
- Lujo Brentano (1884–1931), German economist and social reformer
- George Alexander Duncan (1902–2006), professor of political economy
- Francis Ysidro Edgeworth (1845–1926), philosopher and political economist
- Morgan Kelly, professor of economics, University College Dublin
- Philip R. Lane (born 1969), academic and economist
- Kevin O'Rourke, Professor of Economic History, Oxford

== Education ==
- Robert Blackburn, International Secretary of the United World Colleges; Deputy Director General of the International Baccalaureate
- Increase Mather, seventh president of Harvard University
- McFadden Alexander Newell, first principal of Maryland State Normal School (Towson University)
- Ferdinand von Prondzynski, president of Dublin City University
- Louise Richardson, former executive dean of Radcliffe Institute for Advanced Study; political scientist at Harvard University; Principal of the University of St Andrews; first female Vice-Chancellor of the University of Oxford as of 1 Jan 2016

== Science, mathematics, engineering and medicine ==
- Beulah Bewley, public health physician
- Denis Parsons Burkitt, surgeon and researcher into childhood cancer (cf. Burkitt's lymphoma)
- William C. Campbell, Nobel Prize in Physiology or Medicine 2015
- Georgia Chenevix-Trench, cancer researcher
- Aeneas Coffey, engineer, inventor of the Coffey still
- Steven Collins, co-founder of Havok
- Dimitri Leonidas Contostavlos, physician, forensic pathologist
- Andrew Hope Davidson, physician and Master of the Rotunda Hospital
- George Francis FitzGerald, professor of physics
- Gordon Foster (1920–2010), fellow emeritus at the college; Professor of Statistics and Dean of the Faculty of Engineering and statistics; author of the International Standard Book Number (ISBN) system (a global standard), and the book Information Technology in Developing Countries
- Aoife Gowen, researcher and professor
- Oliver St John Gogarty, physician and ear surgeon
- Alexander Henry Haliday, entomologist
- Hugh Hamilton, professor of natural philosophy
- William Rowan Hamilton, mathematician
- William Henry Harvey, botanist
- William Charles Hood, physician
- Caroline Hussey, microbiologist
- Werner Israel, physicist
- John Joly, physicist and geologist
- Sir John MacNeill, civil engineer
- Robert Mallet, engineer and scientist
- Una Martin, Clinical Pharmacologist
- Richard Maunsell, Chief Mechanical Engineer, South Eastern and Chatham Railway, and Southern Railway
- Henry Benedict Medlicott, geologist
- William Molyneux, natural philosopher
- Suzanne O'Sullivan, neurologist, prizewinning writer
- Charles Algernon Parsons, engineer, inventor of the modern steam turbine
- Sébastien Philippe, nuclear security specialist
- Thomas Preston, scientist
- Ouida Ramón-Moliner, anaesthetist
- Michael Roberts, mathematician
- William Johnson Sollas, geologist and anthropologist
- William Stokes, physician and professor
- George Johnstone Stoney, physicist who proposed the term 'electron' for the fundamental unit of electricity
- Jane Stout, ecologist and entomologist
- John Lighton Synge, mathematician and scientist
- Charles Hawkes Todd, physician, professor, and president of the Royal College of Surgeons
- Robert Bentley Todd, physician, Kings College professor, and identified with Todd's palsy
- Edward Hutchinson Synge, Irish physicist and nanoscience pioneer
- Ernest Walton, Nobel Prize winner
- Benjamin Worsley, 17th-century physician, surveyor and alchemist
- Peter Wyse Jackson, botanist
- Valerie O'Leary, scientist and researcher
- Abraham Colles, Surgeon and anatomist, described Colles fracture
- Robert William Smith, described Smith's fracture

== Humanities ==
- James Auchmuty, historian, wartime MI6 propagandist and inaugural vice-chancellor of the University of Newcastle, Australia
- Jonathan Bardon, historian
- George Berkeley, philosopher (cf. subjective idealism)
- Turtle Bunbury, historian and author
- J. B. Bury, Irish historian and classicist
- Anna Chahoud, Latin philologist
- Edward Courtney, scholar of Latin literature
- John Cruickshank, scholar of French literature, language, and culture
- Edward Dowden, Shakespearean scholar
- Sorcha Ní Fhlainn, academic specializing in vampire fiction, horror film, and gothic studies
- Roy Foster, Carroll Professor of Irish History, Hertford College, Oxford
- Ian Graham (BSc 1951), Mayanist archaeologist
- Edward Hincks, Orientalist
- Linda Hogan, fellow and Professor of Ecumenics
- Declan Kiberd, Professor of Anglo-Irish Literature, University College Dublin
- R. J. B. Knight, naval historian
- Richard Layte, Professor of Sociology
- William Edward Hartpole Lecky, historian
- John V. Luce, classicist
- F. S. L. Lyons, historian and Provost of Trinity College Dublin
- John Pentland Mahaffy, classicist
- R. B. McDowell, historian
- Robert McKim, philosopher of religion
- Christine E. Morris, Andrew A. David Professor in Greek Archaeology and History
- Jane Ohlmeyer, historian
- Franc Sadleir, Regius Professor Greek and later Provost of Trinity College Dublin; advocate for Catholic emancipation
- Brendan Simms, historian and fellow of Peterhouse, Cambridge
- William Bedell Stanford, senator and Regius Professor of Greek at Trinity College Dublin
- Alastair Sweeny, Canadian historian, publisher
- Rory Sweetman, New Zealand historian
- James Henthorn Todd, Regis Professor, co-founder of Irish Archaeological Society, president of Royal Irish Academy
- Nikolai Tolstoy, historian
- Taha Yasseri, Professor and Inaugural Chair of Technology and Society (2003), Computational Social Scientist

== Law ==
- Sir James Andrews, 1st Baronet, Lord Chief Justice of Northern Ireland
- Deirdre Curtin, lawyer
- Susan Denham, former Chief Justice of the Irish Supreme Court
- Sir Valentine Fleming, chief justice of the Supreme Court of Tasmania
- Henry Flavelle Forbes, C.I.E., President of the Court of Appeal, Iraq, 1920/21
- Hari Singh Gaur, barrister, jurist and educationist in India
- John George, Solicitor-General for Ireland
- Edward Gibson, 1st Baron Ashbourne, Attorney-General and Lord Chancellor of Ireland
- Maureen Harding Clark, judge of the International Criminal Court and the High Court of Ireland
- Gerard Hogan, judge of the Court of Appeal
- Brian McCracken, retired Justice of the Irish Supreme Court; chair of the McCracken Tribunal
- Catherine McGuinness, retired Justice of the Irish Supreme Court; former member of Seanad Éireann and President of the Law Reform Commission
- Frank Murphy, United States Supreme Court Associate Justice (1940–49)
- Patricia O'Brien, United Nations Under-Secretary-General for Legal Affairs and United Nations Legal Counsel
- Christopher Palles, judge, Solicitor-General for Ireland
- Alan Shatter, politician
- James Skinner, Chief Justice of Zambia and Malawi
- William Frederick L. Stanley (1872–1939), lawyer and judge in Republic of Hawaii
- William Stawell, Chief Justice of the Supreme Court of Victoria
- Egbert Udo Udoma, justice of the Nigerian Supreme Court and Chief Justice of Uganda
- Peter Whelan, professor of law

== Literature ==
- Sebastian Barry, novelist
- Samuel Beckett, dramatist, Nobel laureate
- Eavan Boland, poet
- John Boyne, novelist
- Nicholas Brady, poet and translator
- Erskine Barton Childers, writer and journalist
- Eoin Colfer, children's writer
- Naoise Dolan, novelist
- William Congreve, playwright and poet
- Michael de Larrabeiti, author
- J. P. Donleavy, Irish-American author
- Richard Ellmann, literary critic and biographer
- Anne Enright, novelist, winner of Man Booker Prize 2007
- George Farquhar, dramatist
- Tana French, novelist
- Oliver Goldsmith, writer and surgeon
- John Haffenden, professor of literature
- Claire Hennessy, writer and editor
- Jennifer Johnston, Man Booker Prize–winning novelist
- Brendan Kennelly, poet and author
- William Larminie, poet
- Sheridan Le Fanu, author
- Michael Longley, poet
- Patrick MacDonogh, poet
- Rupert Mackeson, racing author
- Thomas MacNevin, writer and journalist
- Derek Mahon, poet
- Bryan Malessa, novelist
- John Martley, poet
- Barry McCrea, novelist and lecturer
- Mark C. McGarrity, crime fiction novelist (under pen name Bartholomew Gill)
- Annemarie Ní Churreáin, poet
- Melatu-Uche Okorie, short-story writer
- Sally Rooney, novelist
- Oliver St. John Gogarty, poet and surgeon
- Jo Shapcott, poet
- Thomas Southerne, dramatist
- Bram Stoker, author, known for Dracula
- Jonathan Swift, satirist, author of Gulliver's Travels
- John Millington Synge, dramatist, poet; author of The Playboy of the Western World
- Nahum Tate, lyricist and Poet Laureate
- William Trevor, novelist particularly known for short stories
- Trevor White, food critic and author of Kitchen Con
- John Duncan Craig, poet
- Oscar Wilde, poet, dramatist, wit; read Greats in Trinity 1871–1874;

== Politics and government ==
- J. E. W. Addison, British judge and Conservative politician
- Ernest Alton, independent Unionist politician in the House of Commons of Southern Ireland and in Seanad Éireann
- Hugh Annesley, 5th Earl Annesley, MP for County Cavan, later an Irish representative peer in the House of Lords
- Thekla Beere, civil servant and chairwoman of the ILO
- John Beresford, statesman
- Harman Blennerhassett, Irish-American supporter of the Burr conspiracy
- Frederick Boland, diplomat and twenty-first Chancellor of the university
- John Boyd, member of the Wisconsin State Assembly
- Noël Browne, Irish Minister for Health and physician
- Edmund Burke, philosopher, political theorist, statesman and MP for the British Whig Party
- Hugh Cairns, 1st Earl Cairns, Lord Chancellor of Great Britain and Chancellor of the University of Dublin
- Sir Edward Carson, leader of the Irish Unionists
- Hélène Conway-Mouret, French senator and former minister
- Richard Curran, National Centre Party and later Fine Gael TD
- Sir Colville Deverell, Governor of the Windward Islands and Mauritius
- Robert Emmet, Irish nationalist
- Henry Grattan, member of the Irish House of Commons
- Cecil Harmsworth, 1st Baron Harmsworth, Liberal MP and brother of press barons, Lord Northcliffe and Lord Rothermere
- Mary Harney, politician, former leader of the PDs and former Tánaiste
- Mark Herdman, diplomat, Governor of the British Virgin Islands (1986–1991)
- Douglas Hyde, first President of Ireland
- Princess Kako of Akishino, Japan
- Brian Lenihan, politician, former Minister for Finance
- George Macartney, British statesman (1st Earl Macartney)
- Jennifer Carroll MacNeill, politician
- Richard Graves MacDonnell, Governor of South Australia, Lieutenant-Governor of Nova Scotia and Governor of Hong Kong
- Josepha Madigan, politician, former Minister Minister for Culture, Heritage and the Gaeltacht
- Mairead Maguire (Irish School of Ecumenics), a peace activist, winner of the Nobel Peace Prize in 1976
- Mary McAleese, 8th President of Ireland
- Mary Lou McDonald, politician and leader of Sinn Féin*
- Leonard Greenham Star Molloy, surgeon and politician
- David Norris, senator, gay rights activist and former presidential candidate
- Conor Cruise O'Brien, politician, writer and academic
- John O'Connell, member of parliament, leader of the Repeal Association
- Liz O'Donnell, politician, former Minister for Overseas Development
- Emily O'Reilly, former journalist, author, Irish Ombudsman, European Ombudsman
- Willie Redmond, Nationalist politician; first World War fatality
- Mary Robinson, former President of Ireland
- Edward Stafford (politician) third Premier of New Zealand
- Sir Malcolm Stevenson, Governor of Cyprus and of the Seychelles
- James Stopford, 2nd Earl of Courtown, Tory politician
- Leo Varadkar, politician, Taoiseach and leader of Fine Gael
- Theobald Wolfe Tone, father of Irish republicanism
- Jaja Wachuku first Nigerian Foreign Affairs Minister
- Henry Westenra, 3rd Baron Rossmore, politician and piper
- Thomas Wyse, politician and diplomat
- Éamon de Valera, American-born Irish statesman and political leader. Attended from 1904 to 1905 as "Edward de Valera".

== Religion ==
- Arthur William Barton, Church of Ireland Archbishop of Dublin
- John Henry Bernard, Church of Ireland Archbishop of Dublin
- William Browne (priest), Anglican priest and Archdeacon of Launceton, Tasmania
- Robert Henry Charles, biblical scholar, theologian, and translator
- Rt. Rev. Dr. John Curtis, bishop of Chekiang, China
- John Nelson Darby, evangelist and Bible translator
- Charles D'Arcy, Church of Ireland Archbishop of Dublin and Armagh
- John Dowden, Bishop of Edinburgh and ecclesiastical historian
- Richard William Enraght, Anglican priest and religious controversialist
- William Fitzgerald, Church of Ireland bishop and author
- David F. Ford, Regius Professor of Divinity at the University of Cambridge since 1991
- Alexander Charles Garrett, bishop of the Episcopal Church in the United States of America
- John Graham, author
- Francis Hales, Anglican Archdeacon of Launceton, Tasmania
- William Connor Magee, Anglican Archbishop of York
- Father John Main, OSB, Benedictine monk
- Fr. Malachi Martin S.J., author
- Charles Maturin, Church of Ireland clergyman and gothic author
- Joseph Ferguson Peacocke, Church of Ireland Archbishop of Dublin
- Beresford Potter, Anglican Archdeacon of Cyprus
- Robert Ram, author of The Soldiers Catechism issued to the New Model Army
- William Reeves, bishop, antiquarian, and President of the Royal Irish Academy
- Robert Warren Stewart, missionary to China, murdered in Kucheng Massacre
- James Henthorn Todd, biblical scholar, educator, and Irish historian: Regius Professor of Hebrew
- William Gowan Todd, author, cleric, and founder of St. Mary's Orphanage for Boys in London
- James Ussher, Primate of All Ireland, noted for calculating the date of creation as the night preceding Sunday 23 October 4004 BC
- Robert Wyse Jackson, Bishop of Limerick, Ardfert and Aghadoe
- Montasser AlDe'emeh, author and researcher

== Sports ==
- Edward Allman-Smith (1886–1969), British Army soldier and field hockey player; Olympic silver medalist, as member of the Ireland field-hockey team at the 1908 Summer Olympics
- Daniel Collins, Irish rower
- Henry Dunlop, founder of Lansdowne Football Club and builder of Lansdowne Road stadium
- Michael Gibson, rugby footballer
- Ed Joyce Irish cricketer
- James Lindsay-Fynn, rower, world championship gold, Great Britain, LM4 - Munich 2007
- Hugo MacNeill, Ireland and British and Irish Lions rugby player
- William McCrum, inventor of penalty kick of football
- Robin Roe (1928–2010), clergyman and rugby footballer
- Dick Spring (born 1950), Gaelic footballer, hurler, rugby footballer, businessman and politician

== Other ==
- Sir Robert Anderson, intelligence officer, theologian and policeman
- Edward Chichester, 4th Marquess of Donegall
- Richard Lovell Edgeworth, inventor, father of Maria Edgeworth
- Mary Elmes (1908–2002), Irish aid worker who was honoured as Righteous Among the Nations for saving the lives of more than 200 Jewish children during the Second World War
- Michael Elmore-Meegan, expert on global health issues, author, humanitarian, founder of charities
- Scilla Elworthy, human rights campaigner
- Sally Fegan-Wyles, director of UNDG
- Half Hung MacNaghten, 18th-century gentleman fraudster
- Kevin McCormack, dancer with Riverdance; graduated from Trinity College with a Bachelor of Science in Pharmacy
- Leonard McNally, playwright, attorney, British spy
- Pamela Uba, medical scientist and first black person to win Miss Ireland title

== See also ==
- List of chancellors of the University of Dublin
- List of professorships at the University of Dublin
- List of provosts of Trinity College Dublin
- List of scholars of Trinity College Dublin
- Alumni Dublinenses
