= Sylvia O'Brien =

Sylvia O'Brien may refer to:

- Sylvia O'Brien (actress) (1924–2006), Dublin-born actress and singer
- Sylvia O'Brien (soprano), Dublin-born soprano
