= Alexis Keller =

American political scientist (born 1962)

Alexis Keller (born 1962) is a professor of Political Sciences at the University of Geneva. He is a former fellow of the Carr Centre for Human Rights Policy at Harvard Kennedy School at Harvard University.

== Career ==
Keller is a professor of Political Sciences at the University of Geneva. After studying at the University of Geneva and the University of Cambridge, Keller taught political and legal theory at several European universities from 1996 to 2002. He has written various books and articles on European intellectual history, legal history and legal theory.

Keller is a senior fellow of the Swiss National Science Foundation and a board member of several international think tanks and various academic organizations. He is also a former fellow of the Carr Centre for Human Rights Policy at Harvard Kennedy School at Harvard University.

== Geneva Accord ==
For his role in initiating and promoting the Geneva Accord, also known as the Geneva Initiative, Keller was awarded the Condorcet-Raymond Aron Prize (2004) and the Seán MacBride Peace Prize (2004).

The Accord was officially launched on December 1, 2003 at a ceremony in Geneva. Amongst its creators are Israeli politician Yossi Beilin, one of the architects of the Oslo accords, and former Palestinian Authority minister Yasser Abed Rabbo.

According to an article in Haaretz, "at the end of 2001, Beilin was invited to two debates with Edward Said at the University of Geneva. At the airport he was met by Dr. Alexis Keller, who told Beilin that he was the one who had initiated the invitation, after having read Beilin's impressions and analysis of the Israeli-Palestinian conflict. He introduced Beilin to his father, a retired diplomat and wealthy banker. Beilin told them about his peace initiative with Abed Rabbo. The young Keller was enthusiastic, contacted the Foreign Ministry in Bern and obtained an official appointment to accompany the talks on behalf of the Swiss government".

== Personal life ==
Keller lives in Geneva and is married with four children. His wife is of Lebanese descent and according to Yossi Beilin in his book The Path to Geneva is partly of Jewish ancestry. Politically, Keller is involved in the Liberal Party.
