= This Hostel Life =

2018 novel by Melatu Uche Okorie

- First edition
- Author: Melatu Uche Okorie
- Language: English
- Genre: Novel
- Publisher: Skein Press; Virago Press
- Publication date: 2018
- Publication place: Ireland

This Hostel Life is a novel by Nigerian-Irish writer Melatu Uche Okorie, it was published in 2018 by Skein Press in Ireland. It is the first novel by the writer. The novel features an invented Nigerian pidgin English patois. It was launched at the International Literature Festival, where Okorie discussed the migrant experience with Nikesh Shukla. This Hostel Life was bought by Virago Press in 2019, and adapted into an operatic work by the Irish National Opera.
