= Laura Magahy =

Irish businessperson

- Born: April 1961 (age 64)
- Occupations: Project manager, company director
- Years active: 1988 - present
- Known for: Sláintecare

Laura Magahy (born April 1961) is an Irish businessperson, former managing director of Temple Bar Properties, and former director of the Sláintecare programme. She was the first woman in Ireland to lead a semi-state company.

== Background ==
Magahy was born in Dublin in 1961. She is the eldest of three children. Her father worked for Bank of Ireland. She attended University College Cork from 1978 to 1981, graduating with a Bachelor of Arts in music and German. In 1988, she earned a Master of Business Administration (MBA) degree from Trinity College Dublin (TCD). She is a chartered director at the Institute of Directors (UK) and the Institute of Directors in Ireland.

== Career ==
After college, Magahy taught in Berlin and Bordeaux. She returned to Ireland, working at the Graffiti Theatre Company in Cork for 4 years, before undertaking her MBA at TCD. From 1988 to 1991, Magahy was project manager at the Irish Film Institute. In 1991, she became managing director of Temple Bar Properties, overseeing the €1 billion regeneration of Temple Bar, Dublin. After leaving her Temple Bar role in 2000, Magahy co-founded MCO Projects, a project management company. MCO won a contract to provide services for the controversial Stadium Ireland project. Magahy's friendship with civil servant Paddy Teahon came under scrutiny by Pat Rabbitte at the Public Accounts Committee. Desmond O'Malley called for the contract to be cancelled. The entire project eventually collapsed. Magahy and MCO went on to work on development of The Digital Hub, a project also run by Teahon.

Magahy has worked on several healthcare projects, including development of the Mater Misericordiae University Hospital and St. Vincent's University Hospital. In 2011, Magahy became the first woman in Ireland and one of only 200 people worldwide to achieve International Project Management Association Level A certification. In 2014, Magahy founded ceramics company Arran Street East.

Magahy has served on several public and private boards in Ireland and the United Kingdom, including CIÉ, Dublin Bus, Ryan Hotels, Dublin Chamber of Commerce, the Arts Council of Ireland, the Ilex Urban Regeneration Board, Design Ireland, Junior Dublin Film Festival, and the Graffiti Theatre-in-Education Company. From 2007 to 2009, she was president of the Institute of Directors in Ireland. Magahy was president of the International Women's Forum from 2010 to 2012. She is an honorary member of the Royal Institute of the Architects of Ireland since 1998.

== Sláintecare ==
In 2018, Magahy left MCO in order to take up the positions of Executive Director and Deputy Secretary of the Sláintecare Programme Implementation Office. She resigned from her Sláintecare roles in September 2021.
