= Andrea Rossi (economist) =

Andrea Rossi is a Development Economist working on human rights. He was the Director of the Measurement and Human Rights Program at the Carr Centre for Human Rights Policy at Harvard Kennedy School, where he was a policy Fellow. He is currently working for the United Nations as an economic and social policy advisor. He was appointed UNICEF’s Chief of Data Collection and Global MICS Coordinator, leading the organization’s efforts to support national surveys on the well-being of children and women through the Multiple Indicator Cluster Surveys (MICS) program.

He has been a United Nations Officer working as advisor on child protection and migration for the United Nations Children's Fund (UNICEF) headquarters in New York City. He has been a research coordinator at the UNICEF Innocenti Research Centre, Florence working specifically on child trafficking. Mr. Rossi is an economist with a particular focus on development and applied research. He previously worked for the International Labour Organization ILO in the East Africa Area Office, in Tanzania in charge of research and statistics on child labour.
