= Emre Kızılkaya =

Turkish journalist

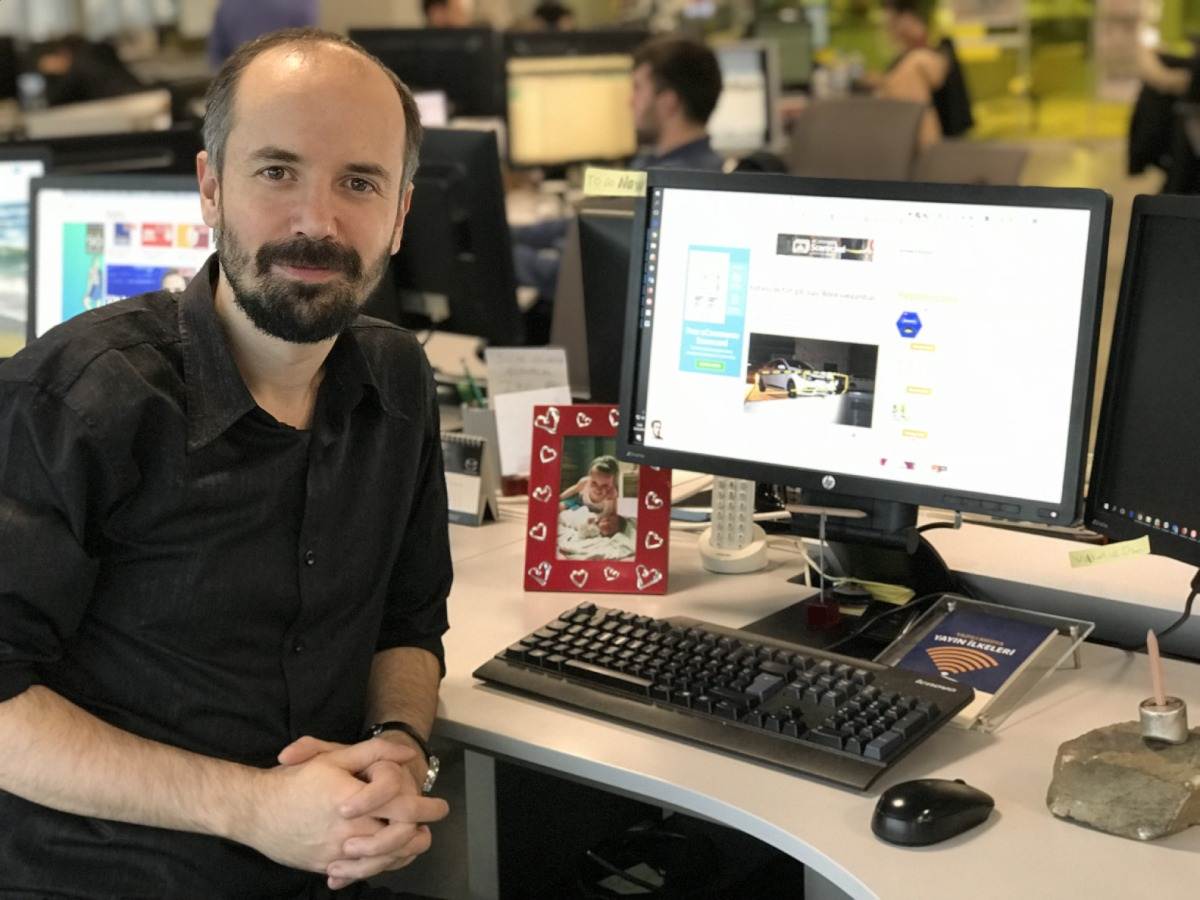
Emre Kizilkaya at the Turkish daily Hürriyet's headquarters in Istanbul in March 2018.

Emre Kızılkaya (born 6 July 1982, in Istanbul) is a Turkish journalist and researcher who served as a vice-chair of the Vienna-based International Press Institute and as a Technology and Human Rights Fellow at Harvard Kennedy School's Carr Center for Human Rights Policy.

== Career ==
Emre Kizilkaya worked in various positions, including foreign news editor and managing editor, at the leading Turkish daily Hürriyet from 2003 to 2019. In 2019, following the acquisition of Turkey's last independent mainstream media company by a pro-government corporation, Kizilkaya resigned from Hürriyet. He subsequently pursued studies in sustainable journalism at Harvard University as a Knight Visiting Nieman Fellow. After his fellowship, Kizilkaya became the editor of Journo.com.tr, a non-profit news website dedicated to Turkey's emerging journalists. Concurrently, he began pursuing a Ph.D. in media studies at Galatasaray University in Istanbul.

As a journalist, a researcher and a press freedom advocate, Kizilkaya has been extensively interviewed and quoted by the international media, including The New York Times, The Guardian, CNN, BBC, Reuters, Agence France-Presse, Associated Press, Le Figaro, Le Nouvel Observateur, Corriere della Sera, Deutsche Welle, Süddeutsche Zeitung, Asahi Shimbun, South China Morning Post, The Intercept, Yedioth Ahronoth, Wired and Al Jazeera.

Throughout his career, Kizilkaya contributed to various international and national publications, including Nieman Reports, Al-Monitor, and Chatham House's magazine The World Today. He also contributed to a report by the UK Centre for Data Ethics & Innovation (CDEI), focusing on the role of AI in addressing misinformation.

== Awards and education ==
Emre Kizilkaya has a B.A degree in Political Science and International Relations from Istanbul University, and an M.A degree in Journalism from Marmara University. His Ph.D. research at Galatasaray University focused on the relationship between public trust and digital media.

In 2017, Kizilkaya was awarded in the Best Use of Video category by the U.S.-based International News Media Association for producing Turkey's first VR news story, and as the Best Digital Columnist by Turkish Journalists' Association for his articles on how digital transformation affects free speech.

In 2018, the Turkish Journalists' Association selected Kizilkaya as the Digital Journalist of the Year for his investigation into the correlations between Google searches and Turkey's official data, revealing previously unreported trends and public-interest information on a wide range of issues including migrants, domestic violence, water pollution, and terrorism.

In 2021, Kizilkaya co-produced an in-depth study into Turkey’s emerging news deserts, which was shortlisted in the Top 100 in the Sigma Awards 2022, a competition to celebrate the best data journalism from around the world.
