= The Unsinkable Molly Brown (musical) =

1960 musical by Willson and Morris

- Original Broadway Cast Recording CD
- Music: Meredith Willson
- Lyrics: Meredith Willson
- Book: Richard Morris
- Basis: The Life of Margaret Brown
- Productions: 1960 Broadway; 1962 US national tour 1989 US national tour 2009 West End; 2014 Denver; 2020 Off-Broadway Revival

The Unsinkable Molly Brown is a 1960 musical with music and lyrics by Meredith Willson and book by Richard Morris. The plot is a fictionalized account of the life of Margaret Brown, who survived the sinking of the RMS Titanic, and her wealthy miner-husband. A musical film version, also titled The Unsinkable Molly Brown, with screenplay by Helen Deutsch, was released in 1964.

== Productions ==
The original Broadway production opened at the Winter Garden Theatre on November 3, 1960, and closed on February 10, 1962, after 532 performances and 1 preview. It was directed by Dore Schary and choreographed by Peter Gennaro. The opening cast included Tammy Grimes, Harve Presnell, and Jack Harrold. Grimes won the Tony Award for Best Featured Actress in a Musical. Grimes appeared in the US national tour in 1962, including Los Angeles and San Francisco in April and June 1962, respectively.

Presnell reprised his stage role for the 1964 film, also titled The Unsinkable Molly Brown starring Debbie Reynolds. The two starred in a 1989-1990 national tour. Argentina had also a version in 1991 starring TV star Susana Giménez.

The first West End production, with Abi Finley and Sean Pol McGreevy in the leading roles, opened in May 2009.

=== Revised versions ===
While the 1989–1990 touring production stayed closer to the original show than subsequent rewrites, there were some minor dialogue differences. The main change was the overhaul of the music. This version of the show begins with a prologue on the RMS Titanic including a brief voiceover by Molly Brown before going back in time to the opening scene with Molly and her brothers. The songs "Denver Police", "Beautiful People of Denver", "Are You Sure", "Bon Jour", and "Keep-a-Hoppin" were all deleted, while "Chick-A-Pen" was moved to Act 1 after the money burns up in the stove. "Colorado My Home" (which was left out of the original Broadway show but reinstated for the 1964 movie) was included as Johnny's introductory song in Act 1, and "He’s My Friend" was added into Act 2, replacing Molly's bad piano playing before the big fight. The Act 2 finale was also reworked to be a reprise of Johnny's Soliloquy and a counterpoint duet of "My Own Brass Bed" and "I'll Never Say No".

A reading of Molly Brown, the first of the revised versions by Dick Scanlan, took place in Denver at the Denver Center Theatre Company's Colorado New Play Summit in February 2009. The show was directed by Kathleen Marshall and starred Kerry O'Malley as Molly, Marc Kudisch as James Joseph "J.J." Brown, William Parry as Horace Tabor, and Linda Mugelston as Polly Pry. The story was revised "to use more elements from the real-life story" of Molly Brown.

A reading of the musical was held in May 2010. The show was directed/choreographed by Kathleen Marshall, music supervision by Michael Rafter, with Sutton Foster as Molly and Craig Bierko as J.J. Brown. This reading had only Molly and J.J. as characters, cutting out all others that were in the previous version.

Another reading of the musical by Scanlan was staged in December 2011. The creative team was the same as in May 2010, and it starred Foster and Kudisch again, Teal Wicks, Francis Jue and Zachary James, among others. About half the score is from the original musical and "the rest of the 'new' score is made up of songs from the late Willson's catalog."

Opening September 12, 2014, a full production of the Dick Scanlan revisioning was produced at the Denver Center for the Performing Arts, running through October 26. The production featured Beth Malone, Burke Moses and David Abeles. The plotline differed significantly from the original production, opening with Molly in the Titanic lifeboat, and then flashing back to follow her life from her first visit to Leadville. The production received favorable reviews from local reviewers and a notice in the New York Times, "A New Crew Salvages Old Molly Brown."

The revised Scanlan version opened on February 8, 2020 (previews) Off-Broadway at the Abrons Arts Center, presented by the Transport Group and directed and choreographed by Kathleen Marshall. Beth Malone and David Aron Damane star.

== Plot ==
The following plot is that of the original 1960 Broadway production

In the early 20th century, feisty tomboy Molly Tobin wrestles with her three younger brothers and tells them and her father that she wants to learn to read and write and to find a rich husband ("I Ain't Down Yet"). Molly makes her way to the Saddle Rock saloon in Leadville, Colorado and applies for a job. On the way to Leadville, Colorado she meets J.J. "Leadville" Johnny Brown, who falls in love with her and promises to give her whatever she wants ("I'll Never Say No"). After they marry, Johnny sells a claim and provides Molly with the money she wants, enough to enter the high social life in Denver ("Beautiful People of Denver"). Molly and Johnny, now dressed in gaudy finery, are made fun of by the Denver society people she wants to impress, and they travel to Europe, against Johnny's better instincts.

The couple, and especially Molly, are welcomed and accepted by European royalty, but the attentions of Prince DeLong towards Molly upset Johnny and he returns to Leadville alone. Molly realizes that Johnny is her true love, and she sails for home on the RMS Titanic ("Dolce Far Niente"). As the Titanic sinks and the tragedy unfolds, Molly survives in one of the lifeboats. She finally is reunited with Johnny, who has built Molly her own "castle", a beautiful home in the Rocky Mountains.

The following plot is that of the 2020 rewrite (taken from MTI's website):

Act One

Prologue: May 29, 1912, Mrs. Margaret "Call Me Molly" Brown is testifying before the United States Senate about the sinking of the Titanic, which took place six weeks earlier. As Molly challenges the Senators, the hearing descends into chaos.

In the small mining town of Leadville, Colorado in 1886. Molly is arguing with the miners, who claim women bring bad luck to the mine ("I Ain't Down Yet"). J.J. Brown, the mine manager, faces off with Molly, only for their confrontation to be interrupted by an explosion in the mine.

Molly visits Julia Gerrard, the pregnant widow of a miner who died in the explosion. Guilt-ridden over bringing "bad luck" to the mine, Molly offers to help Julia and the baby ("The Wonderful Plan"), and Julia promises to teach her to read and write. J.J. arrives with money from the mine to assist Julia. He and Molly almost make amends, only for her to infuriate him all over again. As months pass, Molly and J.J. continue to bicker as Julia gives birth to a baby boy, and they attend his baptism as his godparents ("Just Becuz"). Obvious to everyone but Molly, a bond is growing between the two.

At Christmastime, Molly tells J.J. she's planning to leave soon for Denver. To convince her to stay, J.J. tells her she can't miss the mining company Tea Party. Molly agrees to go if J.J. escorts Julia, thinking that he has a sweet spot for her. Molly has a miner Vincenzo as her escort (unbeknownst to her, he is the one who pines for Julia) ("I've Already Started In").

At the Saddle Rock Saloon, the Tea Party is in full swing. Molly gets everyone to join in a song and dance with her ("Belly up to the Bar, Boys"). Molly meets the mine owner Horace Tabor and his wife Baby Doe. She thanks him for financially supporting Julia. When Tabor reacts with shock, Molly realizes that J.J. was behind the money all along. She chases after J.J., leaving Vincenzo to escort Julia home ("I've Already Started In - Reprise").

Molly finds J.J. at his house to apologize. She sees that J.J. has bought her a silk red dress and the books that Julia said she should read. He confesses his feelings for her and asks Molly to marry him ("I'll Never Say No / Brass Bed / Duet "). She says yes.

A year later, everyone dotes on Molly and J.J.'s baby boy Larry ("He's My Friend"). More time passes, and Molly has given birth to a baby girl. Tabor is rallying the miners to register to vote so James Weaver can be elected president. With Weaver in the White House, Tabor believes he will keep the Gold Standard from wiping silver mines like his out of business.

Julia tells Vincenzo, now her husband, that they're expecting their first child. Vincenzo is ecstatic but is worried about how to support their growing family. Silver-mining work is hard to find in America. Julia convinces him they can go to England for him to find work. Fellow miners Erich and Arthur are planning to leave as well. Molly convinces them and J.J. to pivot to gold mining ("Are You Sure?"). Molly and J.J. pitch the idea to Tabor, who agrees with some hesitations. Tabor and J.J. both warn Molly that mining for gold is very dangerous.

J.J. and the miners descend into the mine and return victorious with gold. Impressed, Tabor gives J.J. 12.5% interest in the mining company (thanks to Molly's bargaining). Molly declares it's time for them to settle down in a place she's long dreamed of: Denver.

Act Two

Molly, J.J., and their maid Mary Nevin sit at their very empty table after everyone has declined their invitation to dine with them. Refusing to get her spirits down, Molly devotes herself to using her wealth to help others in Denver ("Share the Luck / He's My Friend - Reprise"). She joins the suffrage movement and moves a judge to petition the governor for juvenile offenders to receive different treatment.

When the local paper publishes a rumor that Molly plans to run for Congress, J.J. confronts her about neglecting their marriage and children. Molly fires back, telling him he needs to be less competitive with her ("I'd Like to Change Everything About You"). Julia, Vincenzo, Arthur, and Erich surprise them with a visit - just as Mrs. Sneed-Hill and the other women of The Sacred 36 arrive for tea with Molly. Mrs. Sneed-Hill is horrified by the lowly company Molly keeps. J.J. accuses her of hypocrisy and reveals that her father was a smelter. Julia calms Mrs. Sneed-Hill's nerves with a "Cuppa Tea" that has a secret ingredient - whiskey. The tea party is a great success. After the high society ladies leave, J.J., Erich, Arthur, and Vincenzo argue over the miners forming a union, which J.J. staunchly opposes. Molly sides with the union, further enraging J.J. J.J. complains about his disobedient wife in an exclusive business club and gets introduced to a woman named Maud Call by Fred Bonfils, the editor of the Denver Post (“If We Can-Can"). Meanwhile, Molly goes to Leadville to support the miners on strike. When she and J.J. meet each other at their old house in Leadville, J.J. reveals that he was unfaithful to her with Maud - and the Denver Post has published the details. Molly leaves, saying she will get as far away from him as she can.

As a judge declares the custody and financial arrangements between Molly and J.J., a trio of European noblemen sing in adoration of her ("Dolce Trio"). J.J. writes to Molly, who is traveling through Europe. Years pass as they write to each other. Molly is still in Europe, and their children are grown. The memory of J.J., and her desire to be with him, sends her back home. She books passage for the Titanic on its maiden voyage ("To the Boat").

The scene changes to Molly and other survivors rowing a lifeboat on that fateful night in April 1912. She comforts Maureen, a shaken survivor, after standing up to their callous ship officer Hitchens. Molly tells Maureen that she has received word that J.J. is unwell. With help from Maureen, Molly finds her determination again and vows to J.J. that she's coming back to him ("Wait For Me").

Molly reunites with her children and friends in New York City - but not J.J. Ill and on bedrest, he could not make the trip. Molly urgently needs to get back to Colorado. Maureen begs Molly for help with an immigration officer who is about to deport her. Molly implores him to think of the Statue of Liberty and what she stands for ("Share the Luck (Reprise)"). J.J. enters, walking with a cane. They bicker before tenderly embracing. Moved, the immigration officer lets Maureen go. Molly tells the audience "Be calm, never settle… we ain't down yet."

As of 2024, the 2020 rewrite is the only version available for licensing in the United States.

== Musical numbers ==
1960 Broadway Show:

Act I

- Overture—Orchestra
- I Ain't Down Yet—Molly Tobin and Her Brothers
- Belly Up to the Bar, Boys—Molly Tobin, Christmas Morgan and the Miners
- I've A'ready Started In—Johnny "Leadville" Brown, Christmas Morgan, Charlie, Burt and Gitter
- I'll Never Say No—Johnny "Leadville" Brown
- My Own Brass Bed—Molly Tobin
- The Denver Police—Three Policemen
- Beautiful People of Denver—Molly Tobin
- Are You Sure?—Molly Tobin, Monsignor Ryan and Guests
- I Ain't Down Yet (Reprise)—Molly Tobin and Johnny "Leadville" Brown

Act II

- Happy Birthday, Mrs. J. J. Brown—Princess DeLong, Prince DeLong and the International set
- Bon Jour (The Language Song)—Molly Tobin, Prince DeLong and the International set
- If I Knew—Johnny "Leadville" Brown
- Chick-a-pen—Molly Tobin and Johnny "Leadville" Brown
- Keep-a-Hoppin'—Johnny "Leadville" Brown and His Leadville Friends
- Leadville Johnny Brown-Johnny "Leadville" Brown
- Up Where the People Are—Monte Carlo Guests
- Dolce Far Niente—Prince DeLong and Molly Tobin
- I Ain’t Down Yet (Reprise)—Johnny "Leadville" Brown, Molly Tobin and Leadville Friends

2020 Off-Broadway Version:

Act 1

- I Ain't Down Yet - Molly and Male Ensemble
- The Wonderful Plan - Molly and Julia
- Just Becuz - The Trio and Ensemble
- I've A'ready Started In - JJ Brown and The Trio
- A Dancing to the Saddle Rock - Dancing Girls
- Belly Up to the Bar, Boys - Company
- I've A'ready Started In (Reprise) - JJ Brown
- I'll Never Say No / My Own Brass Bed - JJ Brown and Molly
- He's My Friend - The Trio and Ensemble
- Are You Sure? - Molly and JJ Brown

Act 2

- Beautiful People of Denver / The Sacred 36 - Molly, JJ Brown, and Ensemble
- Share the Luck / He's My Friend (Reprise) Molly and Ensemble
- I'd Like to Change Everything About You - JJ Brown and Molly
- Cuppa Tea - Julia, Molly, Female Ensemble
- If We Can-Can - Dancing Girls
- The Dolce Trio - The Trio, JJ Brown, and Molly
- Wait for Me - Molly
- Share the Luck (Reprise) / Finale - Molly and Company

== In popular culture ==
The song "I Ain't Down Yet" became a popular standard. Musicians who recorded it included Dinah Shore in 1961, Lester Lanin and his Orchestra in 1962, and John Gary in 1966. A version by Andre Kostelanetz was used as the theme for the children's TV show Wonderama, in which children in the audience waved their raised arms back and forth in time to the music during the opening credits.

The Gemini 3 capsule was nicknamed Molly Brown in reference to this musical, as Commander Gus Grissom's previous space capsule sank after splashdown.
