= Witness to War: Dr. Charlie Clements =

1985 film

- Directed by: Deborah Shaffer
- Produced by: David Goodman
- Starring: Charlie Clements
- Edited by: Deborah Shaffer
- Production company: Skylight Pictures
- Distributed by: First Run Features
- Release date: October 1985
- Running time: 29 minutes
- Country: United States
- Language: English

Witness to War: Dr. Charlie Clements is a 1985 American short documentary film directed by Deborah Shaffer and starring Charlie Clements. Produced by David H. Goodman, it won an Oscar for Documentary Short Subject at the 58th Academy Awards, held in 1986.

== Cast ==
- Charlie Clements as himself (as Dr. Charlie Clements)
- Richard Nixon as himself (archive footage)
