= Charlie Clements (physician) =

American physician and human rights activist

- Occupations: Human rights advocate, physician, non-profit director (retired)

Charlie Clements is an American retired physician and a human rights activist. He served as the executive director of the Carr Center for Human Rights Policy at the John F. Kennedy School of Government at Harvard University from 2010 to 2016. From 2003 to 2010, Dr. Clements served as president and CEO of the Unitarian Universalist Service Committee, and before that he was the president of Physicians for Human Rights.

Dr. Clements wrote Witness to War, which was published in 1983 and became the subject of a 1985 Academy Award-winning short documentary of the same name. This book chronicles his experience as a distinguished graduate of the Air Force Academy who had flown more than 50 missions in the Vietnam War. Nine months into duty he decided the war was immoral and refused to fly missions in support of the invasion of Cambodia. The Air Force responded by committing him to a psychiatric hospital; he was subsequently declared to have a 10% mental disability and discharged.

Afterwards, Clements entered medical school and came to realize that exploitation, poverty, and injustice were often the origin of illness and injury. Later, as a newly trained physician, he heard the U.S. was sending military aid to the Salvadoran government, a dictatorship whose U.S.-trained death squads had not only murdered and displaced hundreds of Salvadoran citizens, but in Dec 1980 had raped and executed four U.S. Catholic women missioners with only a brief subsequent withdrawal of American aid. Fearing a situation similar to what he'd witnessed in Vietnam, he chose to work in the midst of El Salvador's civil war in an area controlled by the Salvadoran guerrilla resistance group, FMLN. There, the villages he served were bombed, rocketed, or strafed by some of the same aircraft in which he had previously trained.

Upon returning to the U.S., Clements testified in Congress and spoke across the country against the brutality of the U.S. military's actions in El Salvador, led congressional delegations to the region, and raised millions of dollars for humanitarian aid. At the conclusion of the civil war in 1992, he was invited as a special guest to the signing of the Peace Accords in Mexico City and in 2009 to the inauguration of the first FMLN president in El Salvador, Mauricio Funes. In 1997 Clements represented Physicians for Human Rights in the signing of the treaty to ban landmines and later at the Nobel Prize ceremony for the International Campaign to Ban Landmines. Reawakened to the deception of the U.S. government by an emergency human rights mission to Iraq in 2003, Clements once again began his full-time human rights work as president and CEO of the Unitarian Universalist Service Committee. He went on to direct the Carr Center for Human Rights Policy at the John F. Kennedy School of Government at Harvard University. He is currently the Clinical Coordinator for the Physician Assistant program at Touro University California in Vallejo, California.
