= Gregory C. Carr =

American entrepreneur and philanthropist (born 1959)

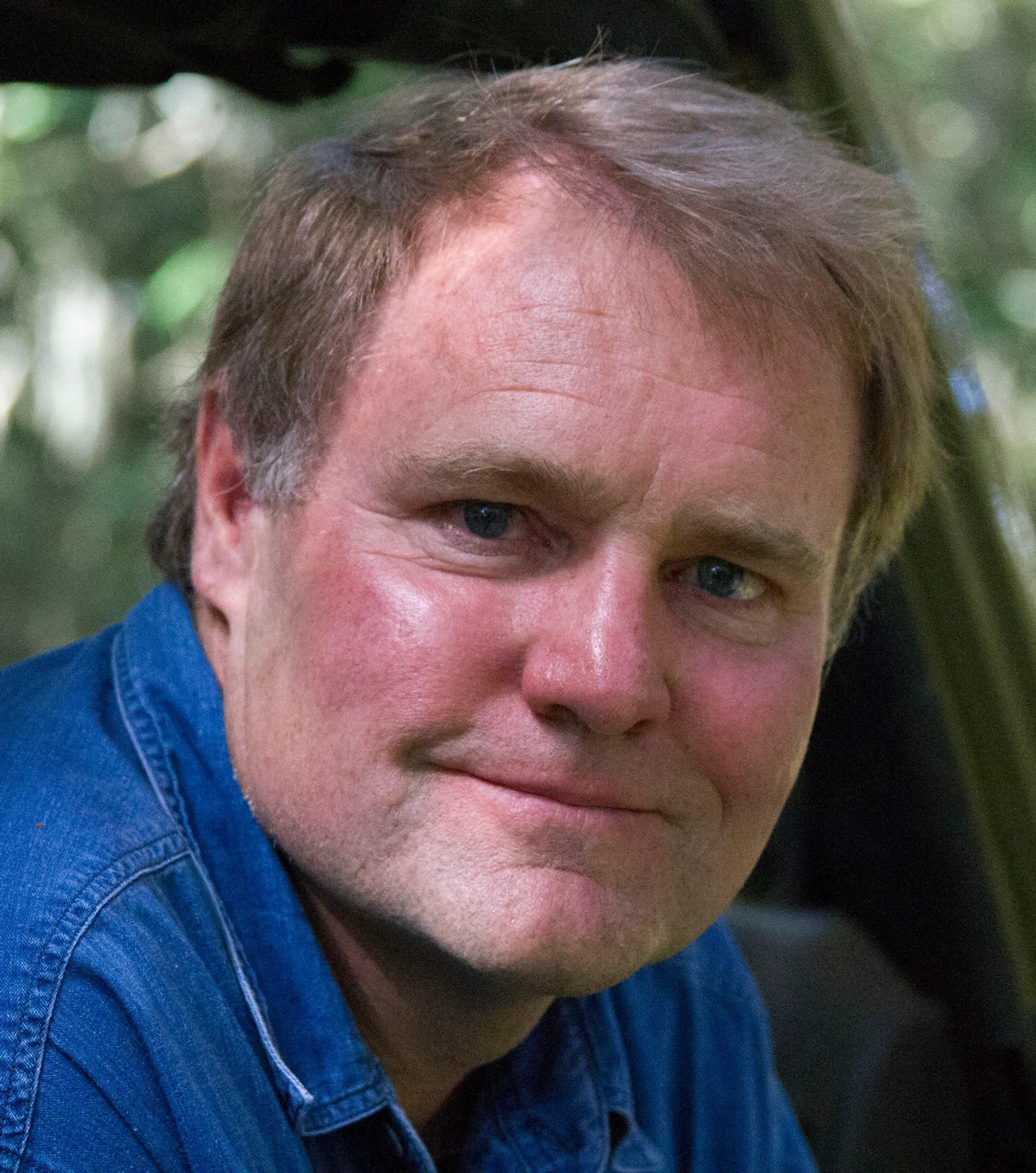
- Born: 1959 (age 66–67); Idaho Falls, Idaho
- Education: Utah State University; Harvard Kennedy School (M.S.)
- Website: www.gorongosa.org

Gregory C. Carr (born 1959) is an American entrepreneur and philanthropist. His main philanthropic venture is the restoration of Mozambique's Gorongosa National Park, which has been ravaged by Mozambican Civil War and environmental destruction. He has pledged more than $100 million over 35 years to restore and protect the park's biodiversity, and to assist communities living adjacent to the park with health care, education and agriculture in a public-private partnership with the government of Mozambique.

== Biography ==
Greg Carr was born and grew up in Idaho Falls, Idaho, in 1959. His parents are Taylor H. and Betty O. Carr. He attended Utah State University as an undergraduate, majoring in history, and received a master's degree in public policy from Harvard Kennedy School in 1986. Later that year, inspired by the breakup of AT&T, he and Scott Jones founded Boston Technology, one of the earlier firms to sell voice mail systems to telephone companies. Carr served as the chair of Boston Technology until it was purchased by Comverse Technology in 1998.

From 1996 to 1998 he was chair of Prodigy, an early global Internet service provider. He also co-founded Africa Online in 1996 and served as its chair until 1998.

In 1998 Carr resigned from his for-profit boards and dedicated himself to humanitarian activities. He was the founding donor to the Carr Center for Human Rights Policy at Harvard University in 1999. Through research and teaching, the Carr Center seeks to make human rights principles central to the formulation of good public policy in the United States and throughout the world.

In 1999 he also founded the Gregory C. Carr Foundation, a non-profit organization through which he has been involved in various projects including the Gorongosa Restoration Project. The Carr Foundation has committed to the 30 year restoration of Gorongosa National Park in central Mozambique as well as to the sustainable development of the communities surrounding the park. The Gorongosa team has reintroduced species to the ecosystem, worked with the Mozambican government to extend the park's boundaries to include Mount Gorongosa and planted more than three million trees on the mountain, created an international restoration ecology science research center, established eco-tourism in the park, and provides health and education programs to the local communities living near the park's borders. National Geographic Television chronicled the park's restoration in their film Africa's Lost Eden, as well as the CBS News program 60 Minutes on October 26, 2008 and December 4, 2022. Carr has frequently been a keynote speaker and panelist on conservation and restoration at universities, conferences, and film festivals. Since 2012, he has guest lectured annually to undergraduate students at Princeton University and was a featured speaker in Princeton's Class of 2014 Last Lectures series.

In 2000, he co-founded the Museum of Idaho located in Idaho Falls, and in 2001 he opened the Market Theater in Harvard Square, Cambridge, Massachusetts. The theater showcased small independent and experimental productions. Carr has been active in human rights activities in his home state of Idaho. In 2001, he purchased the compound of the Aryan Nations, near Hayden Lake, Idaho after it was seized by court order following a successful lawsuit brought by the Southern Poverty Law Center against the Nazi group. The land, donated to North Idaho College, is now a park. In 2002 he was the lead donor to the Anne Frank Human Rights Memorial in Boise, Idaho. He was a close friend of biologist E. O. Wilson. On May 17, 2014, Mr. Carr and Professor Wilson spoke about the restoration of Gorongosa at the Harvard University Museum of Natural History. He served on the board of the E.O. Wilson Biodiversity Foundation until Wilson's passing on December 26, 2021. On July 23rd, 2024, Boise State University awarded Carr the Senator Frank Church Distinguished Service award. He delivered remarks at the gala that evening.

== Awards and honors ==
- Honorary PhD Utah State University. 2003
- Idaho Technology Hall of Fame. 2013
- Honorary PhD Boise State University. 2015
- Frank Church Institute Distinguished Public Service Award. 2024
- Idaho Falls native inducted into Idaho Philanthropy Hall of Fame. 2025
