= Culture Ireland =

Irish State cultural agency

- Formation: 2005
- Founded at: Dublin
- Type: Government organization
- Headquarters: 23 Kildare Street, Dublin 2, D02 TD30
- Director: Sharon Barry
- Parent organization: Department of Culture, Communications and Sport
- Website: https://www.cultureireland.ie/

Culture Ireland (Irish: Cultúr Éireann) is the Irish State Agency established to promote and advance Irish Arts internationally. It was set up in 2005 and is funded by the Department of Culture, Communications and Sport. The budget for 2010 was €4.083m. This had increased to €6.6m by 2023.

The specific activities of Culture Ireland include:

- Funding Irish artists or arts organizations to support Irish cultural activities of excellence
- Funding and facilitating Irish participation at strategic international arts events
- Managing of special ('emblematic') cultural and artistic events
- Advising to the Minister for Arts, Sport and Tourism on international arts and cultural affairs

It showcases Irish cultural activities at international events such as the Edinburgh Festival and the Venice Biennale.

== See also ==
- Arts Council of Ireland
- Culture of Ireland
