= Arts Council (Ireland) =

Agency of the government of Ireland

- Official logo for the Arts Council
- Native name: An Chomhairle Ealaíon
- Industry: The arts
- Founded: 8 May 1951; 75 years ago
- Founder: Government of Ireland
- Headquarters: 70 Merrion Square, Dublin
- Area served: Ireland
- Key people: Maureen Kennelly (CEO); Maura McGrath (Chair)
- Revenue: 77,296,000 euro (2019)
- Total assets: 64,105,000 euro (2022)
- Number of employees: 71 (2022)
- Website: www.artscouncil.ie/home/

The Arts Council (sometimes called the Arts Council of Ireland; legally Irish: An Chomhairle Ealaíon) is the independent "Irish government agency for developing the arts".

== History ==
The Arts Council of Ireland was established in 1951 by the government of Ireland, to encourage interest in Irish art (including visual art, music, performance, and literature) and to channel funding from the state to Irish artists and arts organisations. This includes encouragement of traditional Irish arts, support for contemporary Irish arts, and finance for international arts events in Ireland. The council was modelled on the Arts Council of Great Britain, founded in 1946, and works closely with the Arts Council of Northern Ireland, formed by the British government in Northern Ireland in 1962 to fulfil a similar role.

In 2011, the Council launched Culture Fox, an app and "online guide to Irish cultural events". The project was phased out in 2018.

In 2023, for the 3rd year in a row, the Arts Council received €130 million in funding from the Irish government.

== Description and governance ==
The Arts Council is an agency of the Department of Culture, Communications and Sport. It is the main distributor of funding to artists and arts organisations in Ireland and also serves to advise the government on the arts. It also funds the artists' organization Aosdána. They support architecture, dance, drama, film, literature, music, opera, community arts, street arts and spectacle, visual arts and other multidisciplinary projects.

Maureen Kennelly was appointed as director in 2020.

=== International policy ===
The Arts Council of Ireland is the official Cultural Contact Point between the EU Commission's Cultural Programme and Ireland.

The Arts Council of Ireland is a founding member of the International Federation of Arts Councils and Culture Agencies.

Visual Artists Ireland, the all-Ireland non-governmental organisation representing Irish artists nationally and internationally, is supported by the Arts Council of Ireland.

== Activities ==
=== Culture Night ===
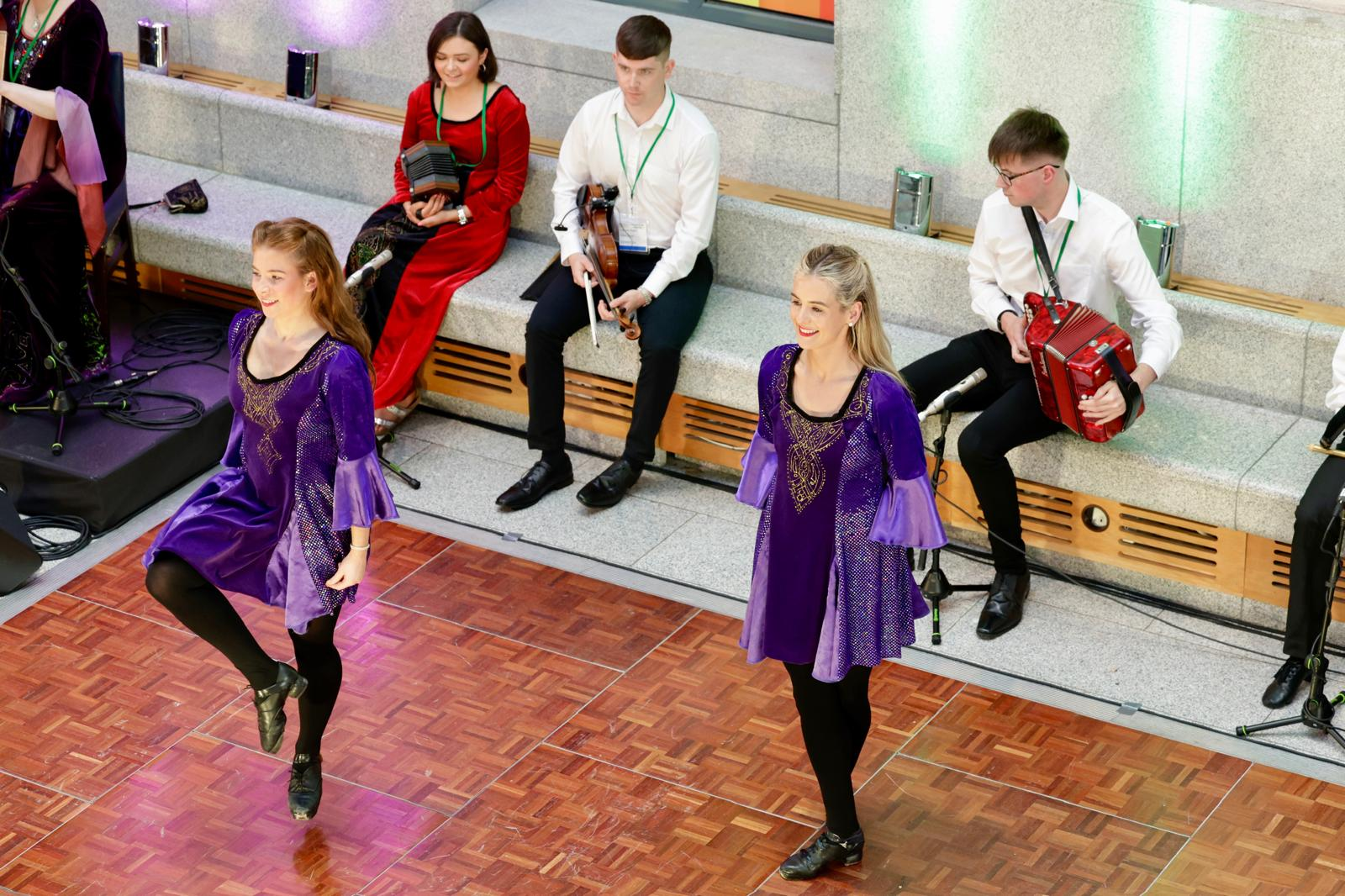
Irish dancers perform at the Houses of the Oireachtas at Culture Night, 2024

Beginning as an initiative of Dublin City Council and the Temple Bar Cultural Trust, the Arts Council has organised an annual Culture night nationwide, in which museums and galleries open later, and special events are staged, on a Friday in every September since 2006. Events also occur in Northern Ireland.

== Members ==
The arts council consists of 12 members and a chair, each appointed for a five-year term by the Minister for Culture, Communications and Sport. The council comprises:

- Maura McGrath - Chair
- Fearghus O'Conchuir - Deputy Chair
- Paddy Glackin
- Loughlin Deegan
- Martina Moloney
- Helen Shaw
- Pádraig Ó Duinnín
- Donall Curtin
- Sinead Moriarty
- Mark O’Kelly
- Melatu Uche Okorie
- Jillian van Turnhout
- Teresa Buczkowska

== Chair of the Arts Council ==
The chair of the council is appointed for a five-year term by the Minister for Culture, Communications and Sport. Past chairs have included:

- Pádraig de Brún (1959–1960)
- Father Donal O'Sullivan SJ (1960–1973)
- Máire de Paor (1974–1978)
- Ciarán Benson (1993–1998)
- Brian Farrell (1998–2000)
- Patrick Murphy (2000–2003)
- Olive Braiden (2003–2009)
- Pat Moylan (2009–2014)
- Sheila Pratschke (2014–2019)
- Kevin Rafter (2019–2024)
- Maura McGrath (2024– )

== See also ==
- Aosdána
- Culture Ireland
- Culture of Ireland
- Poetry Ireland
