= Francis Hales =

Francis Hales (1822–1900) was an Anglican priest in Australia during the Nineteenth Century.

Hales was born in County Limerick and educated at Trinity College, Dublin. Hales was ordained deacon in 1847 and priest in 1848. His first post was a curacy at Castlebar. He then sailed for Australia. He served incumbencies at Heidelberg and Launceston. He was Archdeacon of Launceston from 1877 until his death.
