= Valerie O'Leary =

Irish scientist

Professor Valerie O'Leary
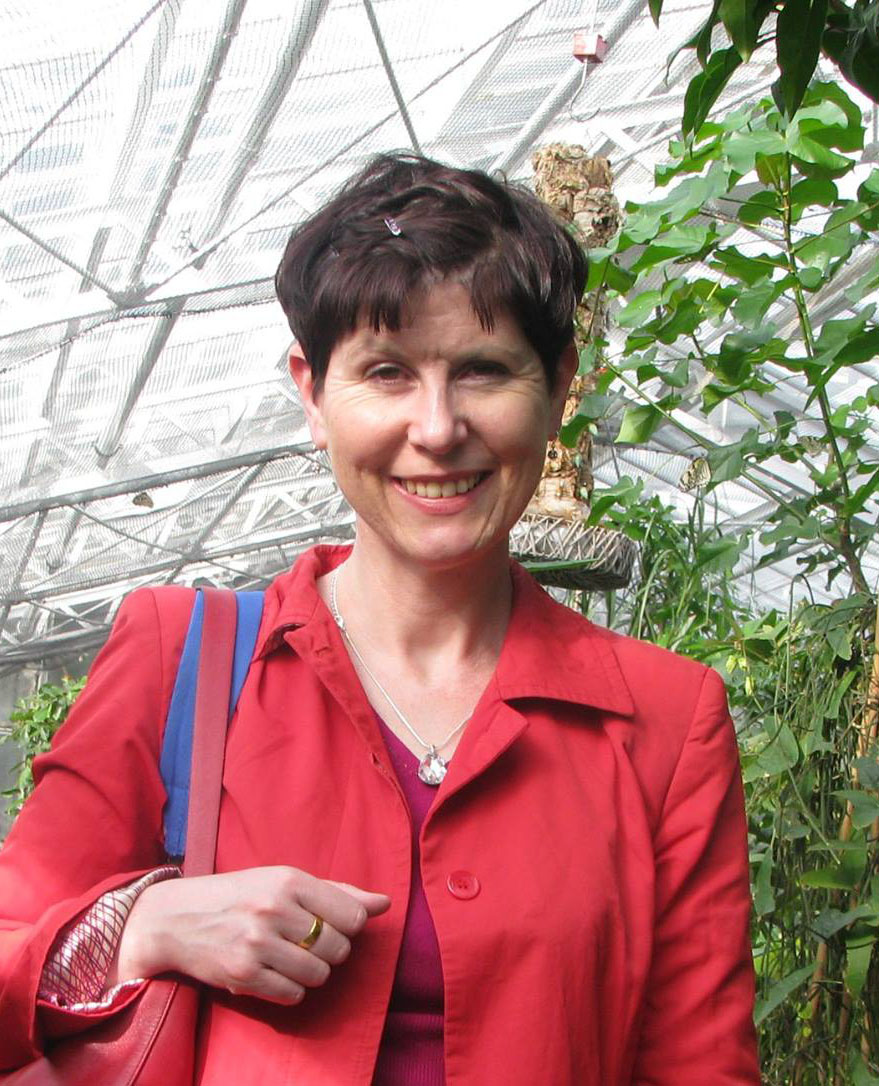
- Born: Valerie Bríd O'Leary; 24 May 1970; Ireland
- Died: 27 March 2024; Maidstone Hospital, Kent
- Burial place: Mount Venus Cemetery, Dublin; 53°15′36″N 6°18′16″W
- Citizenship: Irish
- Education: Charles University
- Alma mater: University College Dublin Ireland (PhD)
- Known for: Molecular Biology Genetics
- Spouse: Saak V. Ovsepian

Valerie Brid O'Leary (died 27 March 2024) was an Irish scientist and researcher with a diverse background in medical genetics, radiation biology, and neurotherapeutics. She was an associate professor at the Department of Medical Genetics (Third Faculty of Medicine, Charles University).

She has about 80 publications that have been cited over 3400 times, giving her an h-index of 29.

She died in 2024 at Maidstone Hospital, Kent, after a short illness.

== Education ==
O'Leary earned a Ph.D. in Botany from Trinity College Dublin in 1996. In 2002, she earned a diploma in DNA sequencing (Genetics) from the National Institute of Mental Health. She also earned a diploma on Genome Sequence and Variation (Genetics) from the University of Cambridge in 2003.

== Career ==
After completing her Ph.D., she joined the Department of Pathobiology at Cleveland Clinic in the United States as a research associate and later joined the Lerner Research Institute, where she held the position of senior researcher in the Department of Cellular and Molecular Medicine. Her research during this period focused on the molecular basis of various diseases and potential therapeutic interventions. In 2007, O'Leary joined Columbia University's Molecular Virology Division as a research associate. Her work significantly contributed to the understanding of viral replication mechanisms and the development of antiviral strategies. O'Leary became a research associate at Dublin City University's International Centre for Neurotherapeutics. In 2013, she joined the Institute of Radiation Biology at the Helmholtz Zentrum München as a researcher. In 2019, she joined Charles University as an associate professor at the Department of Medical Genetics (Third Faculty of Medicine).
