= William Browne (priest) =

William Henry Browne (1800–1877) was an Irish-born Anglican priest in Australia during the nineteenth century.

Browne was born in Mallow, Ireland, and educated at Trinity College, Dublin.

Browne was ordained in 1824. His first post was a curacy at Whitechurch. In October 1828 he arrived at Hobart, replacing the first chaplain, Rev. John Youl, who died on the 25th March 1827. In 1870 Browne came the archdeacon of Launceston.
