= Una Martin =

Clinical pharmacologist

- Education: Trinity College Dublin; University of Edinburgh
- Known for: Hypertension
- Scientific career
- Workplaces: University of Birmingham; University of Southampton

Una Martin is an Irish pharmocologist. She is an emeritus professor of clinical pharmacology and was formerly the deputy pro-vice chancellor for equalities at the University of Birmingham. She is an expert in hypertension and ambulatory monitoring. She is a Fellow of the British Pharmacological Society.

== Early life and education ==
Martin grew up in Ireland, where her parents were dentists. Her father was Dr Nicholas Martin and her mother was Josephine Mary (Maura) Martin. She studied medicine at Trinity College Dublin and graduated in 1983. During her studies she completed an intercalated degree in pharmacology. Martin trained to registrar level in cardiology in Dublin before moving to Edinburgh for her doctoral studies. Martin obtained a PhD from the University of Edinburgh.

== Research and career ==
Martin joined the University of Southampton as a lecturer in clinical pharmacology. She worked on allergic rhinitis and studied whether nitric oxide in exhaled breath could be used to diagnose asthma. She was made a senior lecturer at the University of Birmingham in 1996. She had just given birth to her first child. She identified that patients with hypertension experienced less pain than those with normal blood pressure. She wondered whether this diminished pain perception could be part of a larger impairment, eventually impacting memory. Whilst hypertension became characterised by cognitive deficits, Martin studied the reaction times of people with hypertension and found that reaction times did not differ between people with and without hypertension. Whilst diagnosis of hypertension is typically made using blood pressure measurements in a clinic, Martin pointed out that ambulatory monitoring is the most cost effective and correlates best with cardiovascular outcomes.

Martin is the lead of the Hypertension Service at University Hospitals Birmingham. She has called for people with mild hypertension to try more healthy lifestyles before turning to pharmaceuticals for hypertension. She developed the NICE Clinical Guideline on Hyperternsion (CG127). She has studied the influence of ethnicity on blood pressure measurement. She has investigated the challenges in treating hypertension in elderly patients due to complications with medicine, as well as the risks of treating women of child-bearing age with antihypertensive drugs. The proportion of the UK population who are elderly is increasing, and they are the biggest consumers of drugs, often taking unnecessary medication and Martin has investigated when non-drug therapies can be used in the treatment of elderly patients. Martin has been part of various clinical trials using hypertensives, and has examined the effectiveness of personalised treatment. She has investigated how to manage and diagnose resistant hypertension.

Martin has been involved in the development of undergraduate education; creating the Prescribers’ Licence, which eventually became the National Prescribing Assessment. In 2009 she established the Dr Nicholas and Mrs Maura Martin Scholarship at University College Dublin, a €2000 scholarship for clinical medical electives. She investigated the use of control charts to monitor clinical variables in four conditions; hypertension, asthma, renal function and diabetes.

Martin became programme director of the Wellcome Trust Research Facility at the University of Birmingham in 2014 and was promoted to professor in 2015. She was elected to the editorial board of the British Journal of Cardiology in 2017.

=== Equality and advocacy ===
Martin is involved with activities to promote equality and diversity at the University of Birmingham. Since 2007, she has chaired the Women in Academic Medicine group at the University of Birmingham. She led the University of Birmingham Medical School silver Athena SWAN application in 2014. She was made deputy pro-vice-chancellor for equalities in 2015. Martin is leading on the University of Birmingham application to the Race Equality Charter.
