= Sean Pol McGreevy =

Irish actor and musician

Sean Pol McGreevy (born 11 January 1980) is a Northern Irish actor, singer, composer and musical director best known for Musical Theatre and singing/playing piano in the West End of London. Notable roles include, Mark in Jonathan Larson's Rent 2000, Frank Capra in Mack and Mabel London 2008 and JJ Brown in The Unsinkable Molly Brown London 2009.

== Early career ==
McGreevy was born in Belfast, Northern Ireland. He won an Irish Arts Council Award to study at the Samuel Beckett Centre, Trinity College Dublin where he gained a BA hons in acting studies, graduating in 2002. He starred in the Irish premier of Jonathan Larson's Rent, playing the leading role of 'Mark' in the Olympia Theatre, Dublin in 2000. He went on to play 'JJ Brown' in The Unsinkable Molly Brown alongside Abi Finley in London in 2009.

== Stage career ==
Although a graduate of Trinity College Dublin, he also attributes credit to YouthAction NI's The Rainbow Factory, school of the performing arts, in Belfast where he played a variety of roles including 'Ralph' in The Lord of the Flies at the Lyric Theatre (Belfast). Whilst at Trinity he appeared in Caryl Churchill's Mad Forest; Interludes, based on from Viaje del Parnaso by Miguel de Cervantes; and The Three Sisters by Anton Chekhov culminating in performances at the Abbey Theatre and The Ambassadors Theatre London.

After college he has gone on to star in mostly stage musicals, playing 'Brad' in I Love You, You're Perfect, Now Change in the Dublin premier and Irish tour, 'Prez' in The Pajama Game, Union Theatre (London) 'Frank' in Mack and Mabel Broadway Theatre, Catford and more recently as 'Willie Mossop' in Hobson's Choice, London 2010.

== Singing ==
One of the highlights of his singing career was performing at Glastonbury Festival in 2005. In 2010, he joined the cast of 1916 the musical recording at Abbey Road Studios. He also composed the successful musical Ovid's Transformations which toured Ireland in 2008.

== As musical director and composer ==
McGreevy works as a musical director in both London and Northern Ireland, and as singing coach to many theatre companies including the National Youth Theatre since 2003. His many productions include Oklahoma! at the Broadway Theatre, Catford, Guys and Dolls in 2003 at the Waterfront Hall Belfast, The Pajama Game 2008 at the Union Theatre (London) and Little Shop of Horrors in Belfast 2008.
