= Sally Fegan-Wyles =

United Nations official

Sally Fegan-Wyles currently serves as the Acting Head of the United Nations Institute for Training and Research (UNITAR). She was appointed to this position by the United Nations Secretary-General Ban Ki-moon on 10 September 2012. Prior to this, she was Senior Adviser on System-Wide Coherence in the Office of the Deputy Secretary-General of the United Nations.

Previously, she served as Director of the UN Development Group Office (UNDG), responsible for guiding and supporting the UN's reform efforts at the country level. She was policy fellow in the Carr Centre for Human Rights Policy at Harvard Kennedy School at Harvard University.

She has been a UN staff member for 28 years, mainly working in Africa as UNICEF Representative to Liberia, Uganda, Zimbabwe, or UN Resident Coordinator to Tanzania. As Director of the UNDG, she is responsible for policy support to the UN Country Team and the UN Resident Coordinator in 134 countries, and for the implementation of the ongoing UN reform initiative, including the "One UN" approach being piloted in eight Countries. Some programs Sally pioneered include designing the first UN response to HIV/Aids in Uganda in 1985, leading the international community response to the Zimbabwe drought of 1991, and providing social policy advice to the new Museveni Government in Uganda, during and after the civil war. She is an Irish national and a graduate of Trinity College, Dublin and London School of Economics in economics and social planning.
