= Robert Ram =

English priest (1595-1656)

The Souldiers Catechisme, a religious text written by Ram and distributed to New Model Army soldiers

Robert Ram (c. 1595 – March 1656) was an English Anglican priest in the early seventeenth century. He was a younger son of Thomas Ram, Bishop of Ferns and Leighlin. Ram went to Trinity College Dublin. He was awarded a Bachelor of Arts in 1611, Master of Arts in 1614 and became a Fellow in 1615. He was incorporated as Master of Arts by the University of Cambridge in 1615.

He became Vicar of St Mary and St Nicolas, Spalding in 1626. In 1637 he established a Parish Library, the books from which are in the care of Spalding Gentlemen's Society. During the English Civil War he was taken from his home by Royalists ("Cavaliers") and held hostage in Crowland. He was rescued by Parliamentarian regiments commanded by Sir Miles Hubbard, Sir Anthony Irby and Oliver Cromwell, following the siege of Crowland in April 1643.

In 1645 he was appointed Chaplain to Colonel Sir Edward Rossiter's Lincolnshire Cavalry Regiment He was the author of The Soldiers’ Catechism which was issued to the New Model Army, along with The Souldiers Pocket Bible compiled by Edmund Calamy the Elder.

John Turner wrote in 1684, in regards to Charles II, that the Soldier's Catechism “was without question none of the meanest instruments in bringing his royal father to the block." He returned to his parish duties in May 1646, and remained in Spalding until his death in March 1656.
