= Carr Center for Human Rights Policy =

Research center at Harvard Kennedy School

- Named after: Gregory C. Carr and Vincent Ryan
- Formation: 1999
- Type: Human rights
- Location: Cambridge, Massachusetts, U.S.
- Faculty director: Mathias Risse
- Parent organization: Harvard Kennedy School
- Website: http://carrcenter.hks.harvard.edu

Carr Center for Human Rights Policy is a research center at Harvard Kennedy School founded in 1999. The center's scholars address issues related to human rights, including human security, global governance and civil society, economic justice, and equality and discrimination.

== History ==
The center was founded with financial support from Harvard Kennedy School alumnus Greg Carr, who donated $18 million for its founding.

The current faculty director at the Carr Center is Mathias Risse. The current executive director is Maggie Gates. The Center was previously directed by Michael Ignatieff (2000-2005), Sarah Sewall (2005-2008), Rory Stewart (2009-2010), and by Douglas Johnson (2013-2018). The founding executive director of the Center is former United States Ambassador to the United Nations Samantha Power, who held the position from 1998–2002. Charlie Clements served as executive director from 2010–2015, followed by Sushma Raman as executive director from 2015-2023.

Fellows who are or have been associated with the Center include Laura Murphy, John Shattuck, William Schulz, Luis Moreno Ocampo, William Arkin, Roméo Dallaire, Caroline Elkins, Alberto J. Mora, Sally Fegan-Wyles, Omer Ismail, Andrea Rossi, Beena Sarwar, Daniel J. Jones, Luís Roberto Barroso, Kenneth Roth, Emre Kızılkaya, Nai Lee Kalema, Nicholas Shaxson and Taslima Nasrin.

== Founding ==
The center was founded in 1999 by Graham Allison and Samantha Power with the financial support of Kennedy School alumnus Greg Carr, who donated $18 million.

== Current programs ==
The center claims its programs are aimed at addressing public policy challenges that are complex, entrenched, multifaceted, and increasingly transcending boundaries of the nation-state. They require ideas, tools, and approaches that are global and cross-disciplinary.

The Carr Center claims that its objective is to respond to this rapidly changing environment through its mission of realizing global justice through theory, policy, and practice.

== Former programs ==
- The Human Rights and Social Movements Program examines the complex relationship between human rights and social movements with a particular emphasis on how grassroots mobilizations have shaped and contested modern conceptions and practices of human rights, both in the United States and throughout the world. This new program is guided by the faith that social movements have played—and continue to play—a significant role in the conception, development, evolution, and implementation of what Michael Ignatieff refers to as the "human rights revolution."
- The Program on Human Trafficking and Modern Day Slavery attempts to expand the understanding of human trafficking in all its dimensions and develop policies to address this global affront to human dignity. This program conducts research, connects scholars and practitioners, develops best practices, and engages anti-trafficking policymakers and future public policy leaders around the world.
- The Mass Atrocity Response Operation (MARO) Project seeks to enable the United States and the international community to limit or prevent mass atrocities through an integrated strategy by explaining key relevant military concepts and planning considerations. The MARO Project is based on the insight that the failure to act in the face of mass killings of civilians is not simply a function of political will or legal authority; the failure also reflects a lack of thinking about how military forces might respond. States and regional and international organizations must better understand and prepare for the unique operational and moral challenges that military forces would face in a MARO.
- The National Security and Human Rights (NSHR) Program examines national security issues through the prism of human rights, weaving humanitarian concerns into the fabric of traditional security studies. Through research, publications, and dialogue among practitioners and academics, the Program aims to shape national and international security and human rights policies and the promotion of organizational learning and change. The Program addresses issues ranging from the effect of war on foreign civilians to the impact of security measures upon American citizens; from civil-military relations at the highest levels in Washington to actions in the field; and from the role of military ethics, leadership, training, doctrine, and capabilities in upholding human rights norms and laws to national and international judicial redress for abuses committed during armed conflict.
- The Measurement and Human Rights Program (MHR) is designed to bring evidence-based policy and programming to the realm of human rights. The MHR Program, aims to frame the discussion on the role of systematic assessment techniques in human rights work, by addressing some of the most basic and yet most difficult questions in the field: How can we collect solid evidence of human rights violations? How do we measure progress in promoting human rights? How can organizations assess their own impact more effectively? The Program has worked with leading academics and practitioners in the human rights field, promoting the systematic use of solid research methodology, data collection, and analysis in formulating human rights policies.
- The Program on State Building and Human Rights, Afghanistan and Pakistan seeks to enable researchers and practitioners to draw on their extensive field experience to better explain some of the key characteristics of the intervention in Afghanistan, including: the proliferation of objectives that often lack clear causal connectedness to the overall goals of the mission; what has worked and why; the implications of establishing parallel systems and how the perverse consequences of the actions of the international community can be avoided in the future; and documenting the structural factors that lead to "fairy tales" or myths becoming conventional wisdom. At the same time, the Program will identify positive examples of what has worked well and holds promise for the future.
- The Afghan Students Initiative (ASI) was formed in September 2009 to engage local Afghan students with Carr Center programs and resources. It has since evolved into an active student group that seeks to promote discussion and awareness on issues of importance to Afghanistan. The group, which is the first of its kind in the Boston area, was organized in collaboration with fellows and staff from the Carr Center's State Building and Human Rights in Afghanistan and Pakistan program.
- The Kashmir Initiative hopes to bring inclusive dialogue and broader awareness of the complex issue of Kashmir. Kashmir's geopolitical importance has increased drastically with the continuing war along Pakistan's untamed western border and Afghanistan. Divided and disputed between India and Pakistan, Kashmir has seen conflict for the past 62 years. It has been identified by the U.S. government as the world's most militarized dispute. This conflict is, however, more than a territorial dispute between two nuclear powers. As states negotiate solutions, the voice of Kashmiris who have suffered internal conflict and human rights abuses must not be lost in the cacophony of realpolitik.
- The Latin America Initiative examines the pressing human rights issues related to social conflicts that result from ethnic tensions, erosion in the practice of democracy, extreme poverty, and the war on drugs. In Latin America human rights abuses do not take extreme forms. Except for Argentina's Dirty War, the Pinochet dictatorship in Chile, Guatemala in the recent past and in Colombia at some stage in its civil war, genocide and other mass atrocities are not a current occurrence in the region. However, there are still many pressing issues that need to be addressed. Most of these are related either to the lack of legal enforcement throughout the region or to governmental abuses in the face of weakening contending powers. In order to improve these conditions, it is important that democracies are strengthened and strong legal systems put in place or reinforced.
- The Gebran G. Tueni Human Rights Fellowship, sponsored by a gift from the Hariri Foundation-USA, supports two 10-month fellowships per year during a three-year period for scholars, journalists, writers, and human rights activists from Lebanon or Iraq to conduct research in residence at the Carr Center. Each of the Gebran G. Tueni Fellows will undertake a major research project focusing on the areas of freedom of speech, arbitrary detention, or discrimination against minorities, displaced populations, or other vulnerable groups in one or more countries in the Middle East.
- The Right to Water Initiative uses a human rights framework to examine global inequalities in access to clean water and sanitation. Nearly one billion people do not have access to drinking water, nearly 2.6 billion people lack access to sanitation, and nearly 1.6 million people die every year from water and sanitation-related diseases. However, improving access to water is not simply a question of engineering or science. At the heart of the problem lie fundamental legal, political and moral questions.
