= New Model Army =

Army of the Parliamentarians and Commonwealth of England

- The Souldiers Catechisme, a religious justification for the New Model Army distributed to the army's soldiers
- Active: 1645–1660
- Country: Parliamentarians; Commonwealth of England
- Allegiance: Council of State (1649–1653; 1659–1660); Lord Protector (1653–1659)
- Type: Army
- Engagements: Wars of the Three Kingdoms; English Civil War; First English Civil War; Second English Civil War; Leveller Mutinies; Cromwellian conquest of Ireland; Anglo-Scottish war (1650–1652); First Anglo-Dutch War; English invasion of Acadia (1654); Anglo-Spanish War (1654–1660)

Commanders
- Commander-in-Chief: Thomas Fairfax, George Monck
- Notable commanders: Oliver Cromwell, Thomas Pride, John Lambert, Henry Ireton, William Lockhart

The New Model Army (known contemporaneously as the New Modelled Army or the Parliaments Army) was a standing army raised by the Parliamentarians in 1645 during the First English Civil War. The first English standing army, it differed from other armies which served in Wars of the Three Kingdoms in that New Model Army troops were liable for service anywhere rather than being limited to a single region or garrison. To establish a professional officer corps, the army's officers were prohibited from having seats in either the House of Lords or House of Commons to encourage their separation from the political or religious factions among the Parliamentarians. The New Model Army played a major role in leading the Parliamentarians to victory in the first civil war in 1646.

Recruits for the New Model Army came from both veteran troops and conscripts, with many of the army's soldiers holding dissenting religious beliefs or radical political views unique among British armies, though the New Model Army's senior officers did not share many of their soldiers' more extreme stances. In 1648 the army spearheaded the Parliamentarian victory in the Second English Civil War and carried out Pride's Purge to purge Parliament of MPs considered hostile to the New Model Army. Following Charles I's execution in 1649 the Kingdom of England was transformed into the Commonwealth of England. Under the leadership of Oliver Cromwell, the New Model Army conquered Scotland and then Ireland between 1649 and 1653 before serving in the West Indies and Flanders as part of the Anglo-Spanish War of 1654–1660. In 1660 the New Model Army was disbanded following the Stuart Restoration, although many of the army's veterans joined the English Army when it was raised in 1661.

== Foundation ==
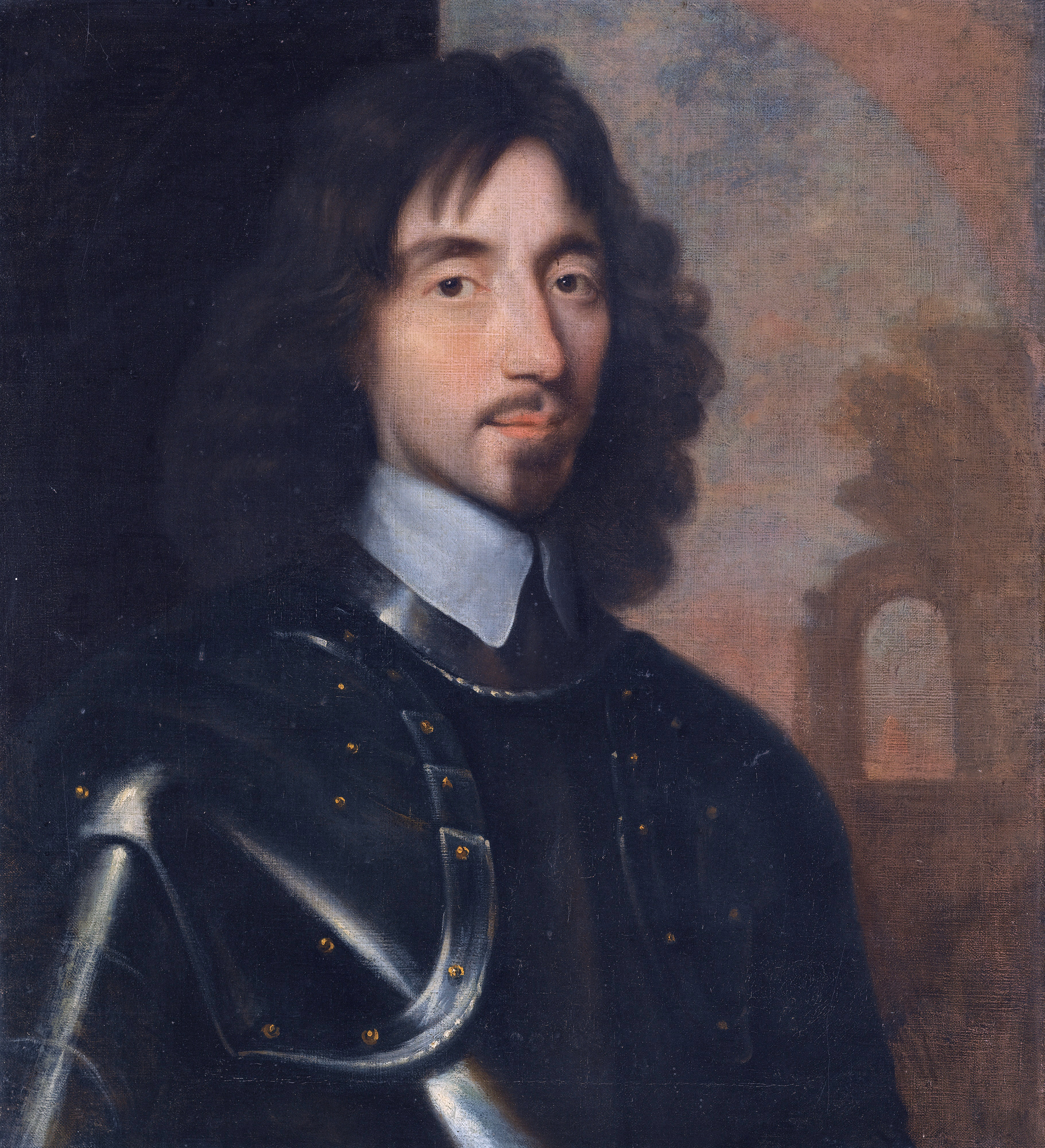
Sir Thomas Fairfax, appointed commander of the New Model Army in April 1645

The forces raised in 1642 by both Royalists and Parliamentarians were based on part-time militia known as Trained bands. Founded in 1572, these were organised by county, controlled by Lord-lieutenants appointed by the king, and constituted the only permanent military force in the country. The muster roll of February 1638 shows wide variations in size, equipment and training; the largest and best trained were based in London with 8,000, later increased to 20,000. When the First English Civil War began in August 1642, many of the largest militia were based in Parliamentarian areas like London, while Royalist counties like Shropshire or Glamorgan had fewer than 500 men.

The weakness of this system was the reluctance of locally raised troops to serve outside their "home" areas, a problem for both sides during the war. On 19 November 1644, the Parliamentarian Eastern Association announced that they could no longer meet the cost of maintaining their forces, which then comprised about half the field force available to Parliament. In response, the Committee of Both Kingdoms conducted a wide-ranging review of further military needs and recommended the establishment of a centralised, professional force. On 30 January 1645, committeemen of the Eastern Association discussed their concerns at the Bury Conference at Bury St Edmunds. On 17 February 1645, the New Model Army Ordinance became law, with Sir Thomas Fairfax being appointed Captain General, or commander in chief, and Philip Skippon being appointed Major General of the Foot.

The review coincided with increasing dissatisfaction as to the conduct of certain senior commanders; in July 1644, a Parliamentarian force under Fairfax and Oliver Cromwell secured control of Northern England by victory at Marston Moor. However, this was offset first by defeat at Lostwithiel in September, then lack of decisiveness at the Second Battle of Newbury in October. The two commanders involved, Essex and Manchester, were accused by many in Parliament of lacking commitment, a group that included moderates like Sir William Waller as well as radicals like Cromwell.

In December 1644, Sir Henry Vane introduced the Self-denying Ordinance, requiring those holding military commissions to resign from Parliament. As members of the House of Lords, Manchester and Essex were automatically removed, since (unlike MPs) they could not resign their titles, although they could be re-appointed, 'if Parliament approved'. Although delayed by the Lords, the Ordinance came into force on 3 April 1645. Since Cromwell was MP for Cambridge, command of the cavalry was initially given to Colonel Bartholomew Vermuyden, a former officer in the Eastern Association who was of Dutch origin and wanted to return home. Fairfax asked that Cromwell be appointed Lieutenant General of the Horse in place of Vermuyden, making him one of two original exceptions to the Self-denying Ordinance, the other being Sir William Brereton, commander in Cheshire. They were allowed to serve under a series of three-month temporary commissions that were continually extended.

Other Parliamentarian forces were consolidated into two regional armies, the Northern Association under Sydnam Poyntz and the Western Association under Edward Massey.

=== Establishment and character ===
Oliver Cromwell, appointed commander of the cavalry

Parliament authorised an Army of 22,000 soldiers, most of whom came from three existing Parliamentarian armies; that commanded by the Earl of Essex, Waller's Southern Association and the Eastern Association under the Earl of Manchester. It comprised 6,600 cavalry, divided into eleven units of 600 men, 14,400 foot, comprising twelve regiments of 1,200 men, and 1,000 dragoons. Originally, each regiment of cavalry had a company of dragoons attached, but at the urging of Fairfax on 1 March they were formed into a separate unit commanded by Colonel John Okey. Although the cavalry regiments were already up to strength, the infantry was severely understrength and in May 1645 was still 4,000 men below the approved level.

By creating fewer but larger regiments, the re-organisation greatly reduced the requirement for officers and senior NCOs. Fairfax had more than double the number of officers needed to fill his 200 vacancies and those deemed surplus to requirements were either discharged or persuaded to re-enlist at a lower rank. Essex and Manchester raised objections to around 30% of those on the list, for reasons that are still debated, but ultimately only five changes were approved. In addition, several Scots officers refused to take up their appointments, including John Middleton, originally colonel of the Second Regiment of Horse.

The standard daily pay was eight pence for infantry and two shillings for cavalry, who also had to supply their own horses, while the administration of the Army was more centralised, with improved provision of adequate food, clothing and other supplies. At the same time, recruits were also supposed to be motivated by religious fervour, as demonstrated in the "Soldier's catechism", written by Robert Ram. On 9 June 1645, Sir Samuel Luke, one of the officers discharged, wrote the Army was "the bravest for bodies of men, horse and arms so far as the common soldiers as ever I saw in my life". However, he later complained that many soldiers were drunk and their officers were often indistinguishable from enlisted men.

The extent to which the Army can be seen as a hotbed of religious and political radicalism is disputed, particularly since many of those now viewed as radicals, like Thomas Horton or Thomas Pride, were not considered such at the time. It is generally agreed that Fairfax, himself a moderate Presbyterian, sought to achieve a balance, while Essex and Manchester tried to remove those they viewed as unsuitable. What is debated is whether they did so for military reasons, favouring the retention of established officer cadres, or to eliminate personal enemies and those considered too radical. Ultimately they failed and Fairfax successfully achieved his objective.

=== Name ===
The Oxford English Dictionary dated the earliest use of the phrase "New Model Army" to the works of the Scottish historian Thomas Carlyle in 1845, and the exact term does not appear in 17th- or 18th-century documents. Records from February 1646 refer to the "New Modelled Army"—the idiom of the time being to refer to an army that was "new-modelled" rather than appending the word "army" to "new model".

=== Original order of battle ===
The order of battle was as follows:

Type	Colonel	Origin	Notes
Horse	Sir Thomas Fairfax's Regiment	Army of the Eastern Association	Formerly part of Oliver Cromwell's double regiment of 'Ironsides'. Sir Thomas Fairfax's Lifeguard (formerly the Earl of Essex's Lifeguard troop) formed extra senior troop.
Horse	Edward Whalley's Regiment	Army of the Eastern Association	Formerly part of Oliver Cromwell's double regiment of 'Ironsides'. Richard Baxter served as chaplain July 1645 – July 1646.
Horse	Charles Fleetwood's Regiment	Army of the Eastern Association	Said to have many Independents in its ranks
Horse	Nathaniel Rich's Regiment	Army of the Eastern Association	Formerly the Earl of Manchester's Regiment. Originally intended for Algernon Sydney, who declined the appointment due to health concerns. Rich had earlier been rejected by the Commons for a colonelcy.
Horse	Bartholomew Vermuyden's Regiment	Army of the Eastern Association	Taken over by Oliver Cromwell after Naseby. Vermuyden, one of the last non-English regimental commanders, resigned in July 1645.
Horse	Richard Graves' Regiment	Army of the Earl of Essex	Formerly the Earl of Essex's Regiment. After June 1647, it was commanded by Adrian Scrope. It was disbanded after 1649 Leveller Mutiny at Burford.
Horse	Sir Robert Pye's Regiment	Army of the Earl of Essex	Originally intended for Nathaniel Rich, whose nomination was the only colonelcy rejected by the Commons, though he later received a commission when Algernon Sydney declined his nomination. Pye replaced by Matthew Tomlinson in 1647.
Horse	Thomas Sheffield's Regiment	Army of the Earl of Essex	Sheffield replaced by Thomas Harrison in 1647
Horse	John Butler's Regiment	Army of the Southern Association	Originally intended for John Middleton, who declined so he could serve in Scotland against the Earl of Montrose. Butler replaced by Thomas Horton in 1647
Horse	Henry Ireton's Regiment (Note: a significant effort by the House of Lords to block appointment.)	Army of the Southern Association	
Horse	Edward Rossiter's Regiment	Newly raised	Originally intended to serve in Lincolnshire. Rossiter was replaced by Philip Twisleton in 1647
Dragoons	John Okey's Regiment	Mixed	Later converted to a regiment of Horse
Foot	Sir Thomas Fairfax's Regiment	Army of the Earl of Essex	Originally the Earl of Essex's Regiment but contained some companies from the Eastern Association
Foot	Robert Hammond's Regiment	Army of the Eastern Association	Originally intended for Lawrence Crawford, who refused to serve in the New Model Army
Foot	Edward Montagu's Regiment	Army of the Eastern Association	Montague withdrew from the Army when he was elected MP for Huntingdonshire in October 1645. Replaced by John Lambert.
Foot	John Pickering's Regiment (Note: a significant effort by the House of Commons to block appointment.)	Army of the Eastern Association	Pickering died of an illness at Antre and was replaced by John Hewson in December 1646.
Foot	Thomas Rainsborough's Regiment	Army of the Eastern Association	Originally intended for Colonel Ayloff, who refused to serve in New Model Army.
Foot	Sir Philip Skippon's Regiment	Army of the Earl of Essex	
Foot	Richard Fortescue's Regiment	Army of the Earl of Essex	Fortescue replaced by John Barkstead in 1647. This regiment suffered the deaths of three successive lieutenant colonels in battle. It was unusual for such high-ranking officers to die.
Foot	Edward Harley's Regiment	Army of the Earl of Essex	Originally intended for Colonel Harry Barclay, a Scottish colonel. Harley did not serve in 1645, as he was still recovering from wounds. Lieutenant Colonel Thomas Pride commanded in his absence, and succeeded to command in 1647.
Foot	Richard Ingoldsby's Regiment	Army of the Earl of Essex	
Foot	Walter Lloyd's Regiment	Army of the Earl of Essex	Originally intended for Colonel Edward Aldrich, who refused to command this particular regiment because it was composed of soldiers from many different precursor regiments. Lloyd died in battle in June 1645 and was replaced by William Herbert, who was in turn replaced by Robert Overton in 1647.
Foot	Hardress Waller's Regiment	Army of the Southern Association	Originally intended for Scottish colonel James Holborne
Foot	Ralph Weldon's Regiment	Army of the Southern Association	Originally the "Kentish Regiment". Weldon was replaced by Robert Lilburne in spring 1646 when Weldon was appointed governor of Plymouth. Weldon's Lieutenant Colonel, Nicholas Kempson, was passed over for promotion and undermined Lilburne's command.

== Dress, equipment and tactics ==
=== Horse ===
The New Model Army's elite troops were its Regiments of Horse. They were armed and equipped in the style known at the time as harquebusiers, rather than as heavily armoured cuirassiers. They wore a back-and-front breastplate over a buff leather coat, which itself gave some protection against sword cuts, and normally a lobster-tailed pot helmet with a movable three-barred visor.

Regiments were organised into six troops, of one hundred troopers plus officers, non-commissioned officers and specialists (drummers, farriers etc.). Each troop had its own standard, 2 feet (61 cm) square. On the battlefield, a regiment was normally formed as two "divisions" of three troops, one commanded by the regiment's colonel (or the major, if the colonel was not present), the other by the lieutenant colonel.

Their discipline was markedly superior to that of their Royalist counterparts. Cromwell specifically forbade his men to gallop after a fleeing enemy, but demanded they hold the battlefield. This meant that the New Model cavalry could charge, break an enemy force, regroup and charge again at another objective. On the other hand, when required to pursue, they did so relentlessly, not breaking ranks to loot abandoned enemy baggage as Royalist horse often did.

=== Dragoons ===
The New Model Army contained one regiment of dragoons of twelve companies, each of one hundred men, under Colonel John Okey. Dragoons were mounted infantry, and wore much the same uniform as musketeers although they probably wore stout cloth gaiters to protect the legs while they rode. They were armed with flintlock "snaphaunces".

On the battlefield, their major function was to clear enemy musketeers from in front of their main position. At the Battle of Naseby, they were used to outflank enemy cavalry.

In 1650, Okey's dragoons were converted into a regiment of horse. It appears that, after that date, unregimented companies of dragoons raised from the Militia and other sources were attached to the regiments of horse and foot as required. This was the case at the Battle of Dunbar on 3 September 1650.

=== Foot ===
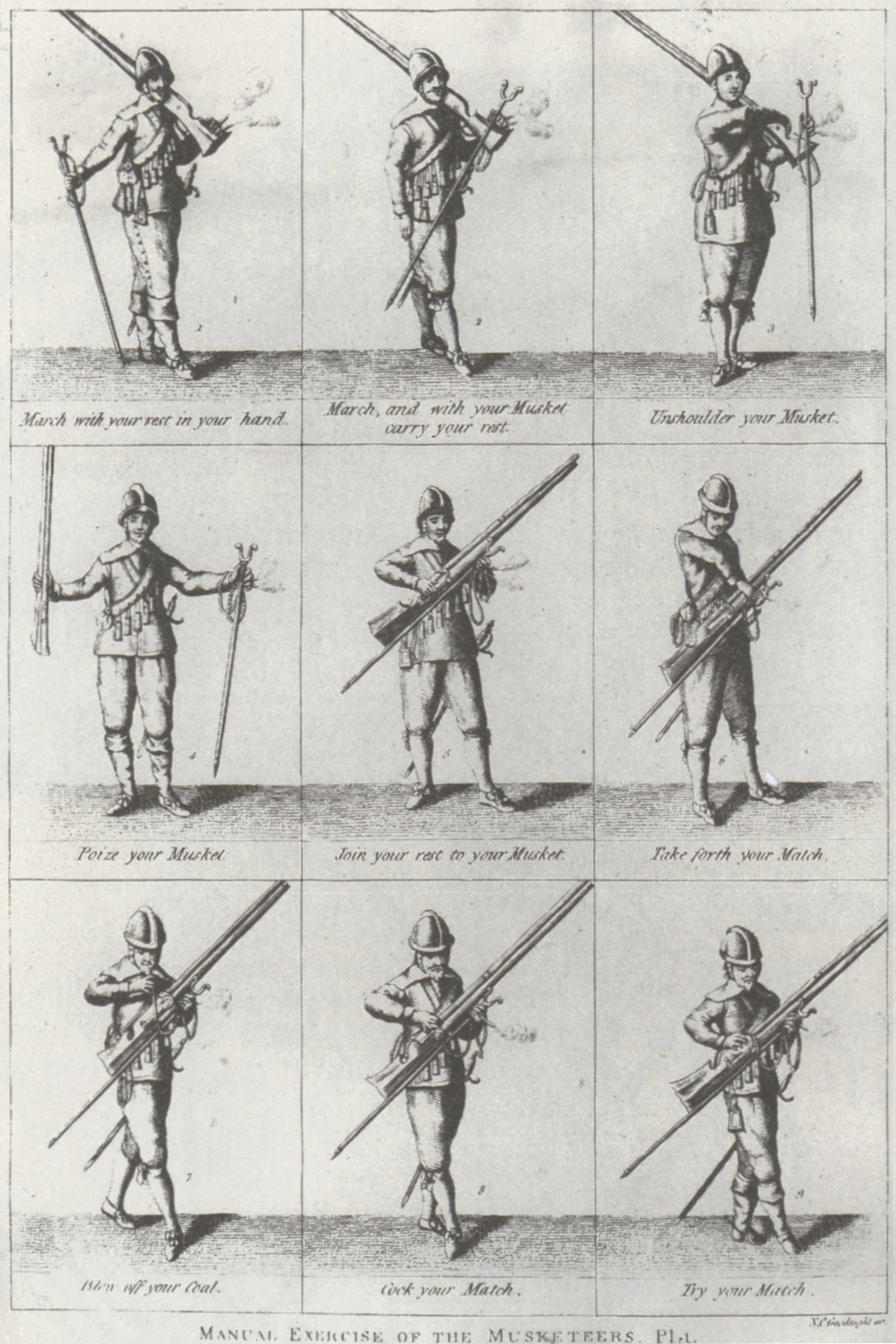
Drill manual for musketeers

The Regiments of Foot consisted of ten companies, in which musketeers and pikemen were mixed, at least on the march. Seven companies consisted of one hundred soldiers, plus officers, specialists and so on, and were commanded by captains. The other three companies were nominally commanded by the regiment's colonel, lieutenant colonel and major, and were stronger (200, 160 and 140 ordinary soldiers respectively).

The regiments of foot were provided with red coats. Red was chosen because uniforms were purchased competitively from the lowest bidder, and Venetian red was the least expensive dye. Those used by the various regiments were distinguished by differently coloured linings, which showed at the collar and ends of the sleeves, and generally matched the colours of the regimental and company standards. In time, they became the official "Facing colour". On some occasions, regiments were referred to, for example, as the "blue" regiment or the "white" regiment from these colours, though in formal correspondence they were referred to by the name of their colonel. Each company had its own standard, 6 feet (180 cm) square. The colonel's company's standard was plain, the lieutenant colonel's had a cross of Saint George in the upper corner nearest the staff, the major's had a "flame" issuing from the cross, and the captains' standards had increasing numbers of heraldic decorations, such as roundels or crosses to indicate their seniority.

The New Model Army always had two musketeers for each pikeman, though depictions of battles show them present in equal numbers. (Note: Two musketeers for each pikeman was not the agreed mix used throughout Europe, and when in 1658 Cromwell, by then the Lord Protector, sent a contingent of the New Model Army to Flanders to support his French allies under the terms of the Treaty of Paris (1657), he supplied regiments with equal numbers of musketeers and pikemen(Firth 1898, pp. 76–77).)

Pikemen, when fully equipped, wore a pot helmet, back- and breastplates over a buff coat, and often also armoured tassets to protect the upper legs. They carried a sixteen-foot pike, and a sword. The heavily burdened pikeman usually dictated the speed of the Army's movement. They were frequently ordered to discard the tassets, and individual soldiers were disciplined for sawing a foot or two from the butts of their pikes, although senior officers were recommended to make the men accustomed to marching with heavy loads by regular route marches. In irregular fighting in Ireland, the New Model temporarily gave up the pike. In battle, the pikemen were supposed to project a solid front of spearheads, to protect the musketeers from cavalry while they reloaded. They also led the infantry advance against enemy foot units, when things came to push of pike.

The musketeers wore no armour, at least by the end of the Civil War, although it is not certain that none had iron helmets at the beginning. They wore a bandolier from which were suspended twelve wooden containers, each with a ball and measured charge of powder for their matchlock muskets. These containers are sometimes referred to as the "Twelve Apostles". According to one source, they carried 1 lb of fine powder, for priming, to 2 lbs of lead and 2 lbs of ordinary powder, the actual charging powder, for 3 lbs of lead. They were normally deployed six ranks deep, and were supposed to keep up a constant fire by means of the countermarch—either by introduction, whereby the rear rank filed to the front to fire a volley, or by retroduction, where the front rank fired a volley then filed to the rear. By the time that they reached the front rank again, they should have reloaded and been prepared to fire. At close quarters, there was often no time for musketeers to reload, and they used their musket butts as clubs. They carried swords, but these were often of inferior quality, and ruined by use for cutting firewood.

=== Artillery ===
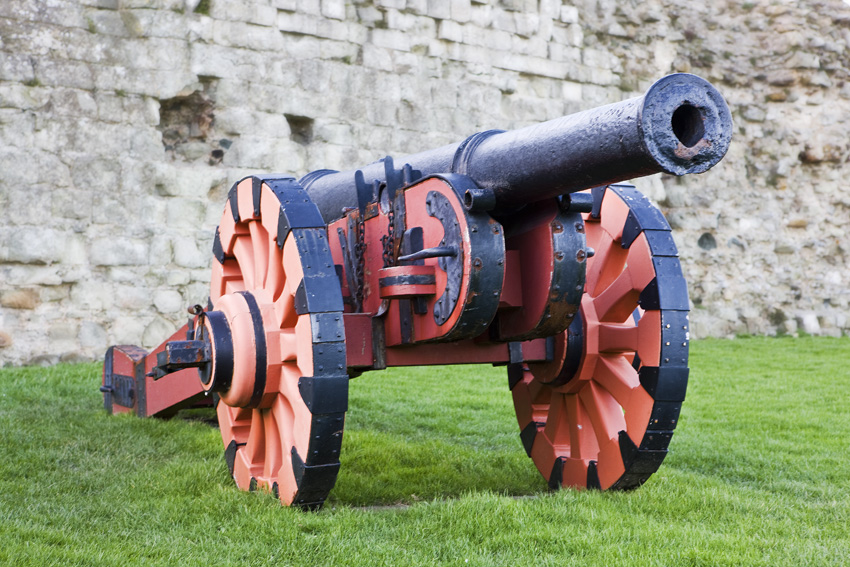
A typical cannon used during the English Civil War

The establishment of the New Model Army's artillery varied over time, and the artillery was administered separately from the Horse and Foot. At the Army's formation, Thomas Hammond (brother of Colonel Robert Hammond, who commanded a Regiment of Foot) was appointed Lieutenant General of the Ordnance.

The establishment of the New Model also included at least two companies of "firelocks" or fusiliers, who wore "tawny coats" instead of red, commanded initially by Major John Desborough.

The artillery was used to most effect in sieges, where its role was to blast breaches in fortifications for the infantry to assault. Cromwell and the other commanders of the Army were not trained in siege warfare and generally tried to take fortified towns by storm rather than go through the complex and time-consuming process of building earthworks and trenches around it so that batteries of cannon could be brought close to the walls to pound it into surrender. The Army generally performed well when storming fortifications, for example at the siege of Drogheda, but paid a heavy price at Clonmel when Cromwell ordered them to attack a well-defended breach.

=== Logistics ===
The New Model did not use tents, instead being quartered in whatever buildings (houses, barns etc.) were available, until they began to serve in the less populated areas of the countries of Ireland and Scotland. In 1650, their tents were each for six men, a file, who carried the tents in parts. In campaigns in Scotland, the troops carried with them seven days' rations, consisting exclusively of biscuit and cheese.

== Civil War campaigns ==
The Army took the field in late April or May, 1645. After an attempt to raise the siege of Taunton was abandoned, the Army began a siege of Oxford, sending a detachment of one regiment of cavalry and four of infantry to reinforce the defenders of Taunton. After the Royalists captured Leicester, Fairfax was ordered to leave Oxford and march north to confront the King's army. On 14 June, the New Model destroyed King Charles' smaller but veteran army at the Battle of Naseby. Leaving the Scots and locally raised forces to contain the King, Fairfax marched into the West Country, where they destroyed the remaining Royalist field army at Langport on 10 July. Thereafter, they reduced the Royalist fortresses in the west and south of England. The last fortress in the west surrendered in early 1646, shortly before Charles surrendered himself to a Scottish army and hostilities ended.

=== Revolutionary politics and the "Agreement of the People" ===
Having won the First Civil War, the soldiers became discontented with the Long Parliament, for several reasons. Firstly, they had not been paid regularly – pay was weeks in arrears – and on the end of hostilities, the conservative MPs in Parliament wanted to either disband the Army or send them to fight in Ireland without addressing the issue of back pay. Secondly, the Long Parliament refused to grant the soldiers amnesty from prosecution for any criminal acts they had been ordered to commit in the Civil War. The soldiers demanded indemnity as several soldiers were hanged after the war for crimes such as stealing horses for use by the cavalry regiments. Thirdly, seeing that most Parliamentarians wanted to restore the King without major democratic reforms or religious freedom. (Note: Under the influence of the Committee of Both Kingdoms which joined English and Scottish Covenantor causes Parliament was inclined to installation of Presbyterianism across England while the NMA tended towards the Independent cause of freedom of religion.)

Two representatives, called Agitators, were elected from each regiment. The Agitators, with two officers from each regiment and the Generals, formed a new body called the Army Council. At a meeting ("rendezvous") held near Newmarket, Suffolk on 4 June 1647, this council issued "A Solemne Engagement of the Army, under the Command of his Excellency Sir Thomas Fairfax" to Parliament on 8 June making their concerns known.

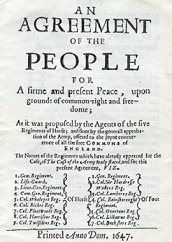
Agreement of the People (1647–1649)

Having come into contact with ideas from the radical movement called the Levellers, the troops of the Army proposed a revolutionary new constitution named the Agreement of the People, which called for almost universal male suffrage, electoral boundary reform, power to rest with a Parliament elected by the people every two years, religious freedom, and an end to imprisonment for debt.

Increasingly concerned at the failure to pay their wages and by political manoeuvrings by King Charles I and by some in Parliament, the army marched slowly towards London over the next few months. In late October and early November at the Putney Debates, the Army debated two different proposals. The first was the Agreement of the People; the other was the Heads of Proposals, put forward by Henry Ireton for the Army Council.

=== Second English Civil War ===
The army remained under control and intact, so it was able to take the field when the Second English Civil War broke out in July 1648. The New Model Army routed English royalist insurrections in Surrey and Kent, and in Wales, before crushing a Scottish invasion force at the Battle of Preston in August.

Many of the Army's radicals now called for the execution of the King, whom they called "Charles Stuart, that man of blood". The majority of the Grandees realised that they could neither negotiate a settlement with Charles I, nor trust him to refrain from raising another army to attack them, so they came reluctantly to the same conclusion as the radicals: they would have to execute him. After the Long Parliament rejected the Army's Remonstrance (Note: Full title: "Remonstrance of his Excellency Thomas Lord Fairfax, Lord Generall of the Parliaments Forces. And of the Generall Councell of Officers Held at St. Albans the 16. of November, 1648") by 125 to 58, the Grandees decided to reconstitute Parliament so that it would agree with the Army's position. On 6 December 1648, Colonel Thomas Pride instituted Pride's Purge and forcibly removed from the House of Commons all those who were not supporters of the religious independents and the Grandees in the Army. The much-reduced Rump Parliament passed the necessary legislation to try Charles I. He was found guilty of high treason by the 59 Commissioners and beheaded on 30 January 1649.

During 1649, there were three mutinies over pay and political demands. The first involved 300 infantrymen of Colonel John Hewson's regiment, who declared that they would not serve in Ireland until the Levellers' programme had been realised. They were cashiered without arrears of pay, which was the threat that had been used to quell the mutiny at the Corkbush Field rendezvous.

In the Bishopsgate mutiny, soldiers of the regiment of Colonel Edward Whalley stationed in Bishopsgate, in London, made demands similar to those of Hewson's regiment. They were ordered out of London.

Less than two weeks later, there was a larger mutiny involving several regiments over pay and political demands. After the resolution of the pay issue, the Banbury mutineers, consisting of 400 soldiers with Leveller sympathies under the command of Captain William Thompson, continued to negotiate for their political demands. They set out for Salisbury in the hope of rallying support from the regiments billeted there. Cromwell launched a night attack on 13 May, in which several mutineers perished, but Captain Thompson escaped, only to be killed in another skirmish near the Diggers community at Wellingborough. The rest were imprisoned in Burford Church until three were shot in the Churchyard on 17 May.

==== Regiments added before or during the Second Civil War ====
Type	Colonel	Origin	Notes
Horse	John Lambert's Regiment	Army of the Northern Association	Raised in 1645. Originally commanded by Sydnam Poyntz. Taken over by Lambert in July 1647.
Horse	Robert Lilburne's Regiment	Army of the Northern Association	Raised in Durham in 1644
Horse	unknown	Army of the Northern Association	Raised in Nottinghamshire in 1642
Foot	Charles Fairfax's Regiment	Newly raised	Raised in the West Riding of Yorkshire in the spring of 1648
Foot	Colonel Bright's Regiment	Army of the Northern Association	Raised in Yorkshire in 1643
Foot	Colonel Maleverer's Regiment	Army of the Northern Association	
Foot	Colonel Tichborne's Regiment	Newly raised	Originally raised to garrison the Tower of London. Establishment increased to field regiment 15 April 1648 and Tichborne replaced by Colonel Needham

=== Ireland ===
Later that year, on 15 August 1649, the New Model Army landed in Ireland to start the Cromwellian conquest of Ireland. At Kilkenny, in March 1650, the town's defenders skilfully beat back numerous Parliamentarian assaults before being forced to surrender. Shortly afterwards, about 2,000 soldiers of the New Model died in abortive assaults against a breach defended by veteran Ulstermen in the siege of Clonmel. These bloody scenes were repeated during the siege of Charlemont Fort later that year.

The Army was also constantly at risk of attack by Irish guerrillas called tóraithe ("tories" in English), literally meaning "pursuer". Overall, around 43,000 English soldiers fought in the Parliamentarian army in Ireland between 1649 and 1653. In addition, some 9,000 Irish Protestants also served. The Army generally performed well when storming fortifications, for example at the siege of Drogheda, but paid a heavy price at Clonmel when Cromwell ordered them to attack a well-defended breach.

=== Scotland ===
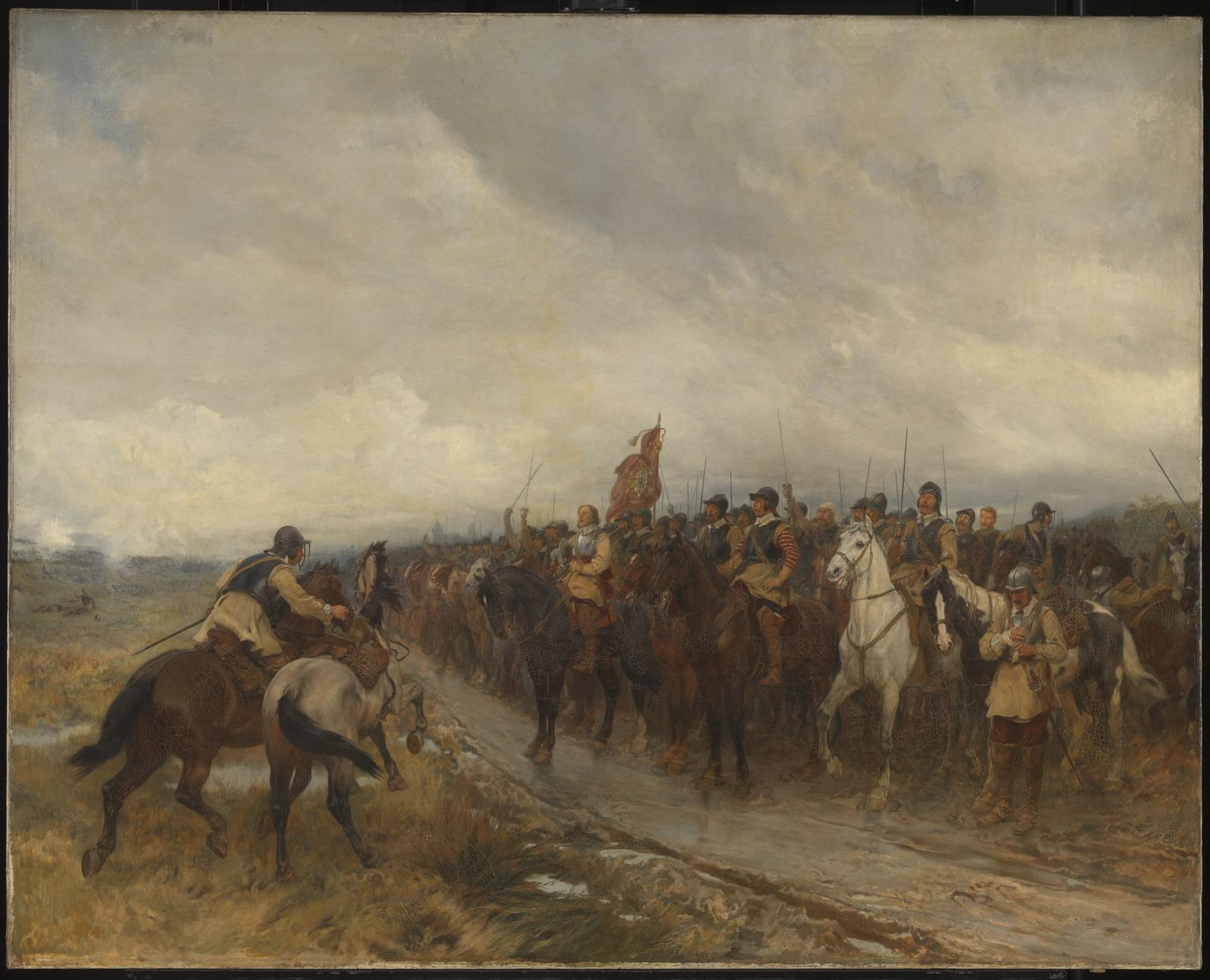
Cromwell at Dunbar by Andrew Carrick Gow, 1886

In 1650, while the conquest of Ireland was still ongoing, part of the New Model Army was sent to Scotland to conquer the country, then dominated by Covenanters. Though they had allied with the Parliamentarians during the First English Civil War, the Covenanters crowned Charles II as King of Scotland on 1 January 1651. Despite being outnumbered, the New Model Army won two crushing victories over the Scots at the Battle of Dunbar on 3 September 1650 and the Battle of Inverkeithing on 20 July 1651. After Charles led a Royalist army into England from Scotland on 1 August 1651, the New Model Army and English militia destroyed Charles' army at the Battle of Worcester on 3 September; the engagement proved to be the last pitched battle of the English Civil War.

== Interregnum ==
In England, the New Model Army was involved in numerous skirmishes with a range of opponents, but these were little more than policing actions. The largest rebellion of the Protectorate took place when the Sealed Knot instigated an insurrection in 1655.

The major foreign entanglement of this period was the Anglo-Spanish War. In 1654, the English Commonwealth declared war on Spain, and regiments of the New Model Army were sent to conquer the Spanish colony of Hispaniola in the Caribbean. They failed in the conflict and sustained heavy casualties from tropical disease. They took over the lightly defended island of Jamaica. The English troops performed better in the European theatre of the war in Flanders. During the Battle of the Dunes (1658), as part of Turenne's army, the red-coats of the New Model Army under the leadership of Sir William Lockhart, Cromwell's ambassador at Paris, astonished both their French allies and Spanish enemies by the stubborn fierceness with which they advanced against a strongly defended sandhill 50 metres (160 ft) high.

After Cromwell died, the Protectorate died a slow death, as did the New Model Army. For a time, in 1659, it appeared that factions of the New Model army forces loyal to different generals might wage war on each other. Regiments garrisoned in Scotland under the command of General Monck were marched to London to ensure the security of the capital prior to the Restoration, without significant opposition from the regiments under other generals, particularly those led by Charles Fleetwood and John Lambert. Following the riots led by Thomas Venner in 1661, which were quelled with the aid of soldiers from Monck's Regiment of Foot and the Regiment of Cuirassiers, the New Model Army was ordered disbanded, with the large arrears of pay financed by a poll tax. Monck's Regiment of Foot, upon the end of the New Model Army, was incorporated into the army of Charles II as the Coldstream Guards.

Some of the demobilised soldiers and officers of the New Model Army were sent to Portugal, to support the Portuguese Restoration War and help Portugal regain its independence after many decades of Spanish rule. The British brigade, which numbered 3,000, arrived in Portugal in August 1662 and proved a decisive factor in winning back Portugal's independence, defeating the Spanish in a major engagement at Ameixial on 8 June 1663, and forcing John of Austria to abandon Évora and retreat across the border with heavy losses.

== See also ==
- Robert Blake (admiral) for developments in the Navy at the time
- British military history

== General sources ==
- Atkinson, Charles Francis (1911). "Fronde, The" . In Chisholm, Hugh (ed.). Encyclopædia Britannica. Vol. 11 (11th ed.). Cambridge University Press. p. 248.
- Bagwell, Richard (1909). Ireland under the Stuarts and under the Interregnum. Vol. 2. London: Longmans, Green, and Co.
- Barnett, Correlli. Britain and her army, 1509–1970: a military, political and social survey (Lane, Allen, 1970), pp. 79–110.
- Chisholm, Hugh, ed. (1911). "Great Rebellion" . Encyclopædia Britannica (11th ed.). Cambridge University Press.
- Cotton, ANB (1975). "Cromwell and the Self-Denying Ordinance". History. 62 (205): 211–231. doi:10.1111/j.1468-229X.1977.tb02337.x. JSTOR 24411238.
- Ede-Borrett, Stephen (2009). "Some Notes on the Raising and Origins of Colonel John Okey's Regiment of Dragoons, March to June, 1645". Journal of the Society for Army Historical Research. 87 (351): 206–213. JSTOR 44231688.
- Fairfax, Thomas; General Council of the New Model Army (1647). "Solemn Engagement of the Army. 1647 (annotated)". Archived from the original on 9 March 2012.
- Falls, Cyril (1969) [1964]. Great Military Battles. London: Spring Books. ISBN 9780600016526.
- Firth, C. H. (1898). "Royalist and Cromwellian Armies in Flanders, 1657–1662". Transactions of the Royal Historical Society. pp. 67–119.
- Firth, C. H. (1972) [1902]. Cromwell's Army: A history of the English soldier during the civil wars, the Commonwealth and the Protectorate (1st ed.). London: Methuen & Co Ltd.
- Fraser, Sarah (2012). The Last Highlander: Scotland's Most Notorious Clan Chief, Rebel & Double Agent. HarperCollins UK. ISBN 9780007302642.
- Hardacre, Paul (1960). "The English Contingent in Portugal, 1662–1668". Journal of the Society for Army Historical Research. 38 (155): 112–125. JSTOR 44228921.
- Hibbert, Christopher (1968). Charles I. London: Weidenfeld & Nicolson.
- HMSO (1802). Journal of the House of Commons: Volume 4, 1644–1646. HMSO.
- Hutton, Ronald (2003). The Royalist War Effort 1642–1646. Routledge. ISBN 978-0-415-30540-2.
- Joyce, Patrick Weston (1883) [1800]. The Origin and History of Irish Names of Places. Creative Media Partners, LLC. ISBN 9781377939018. OCLC 1129714288. OL 19372548M.
- LaFontaine, Bruce (1998). History of the Sword. Dover Publications. ISBN 978-0486401393.
- Lipscombe, Nick (2020). The English Civil War: An Atlas and Concise History of the Wars of the Three Kingdoms 1639–51. Bloomsbury USA. ISBN 978-1472829726.
- Manganiello, Stephen C. (2004). The Concise Encyclopedia of the Revolutions and Wars of England, Scotland, and Ireland, 1639–1660. Scarecrow Press. ISBN 978-0810851009.
- Money, Walter (1884). The first and second battles of Newbury and the siege of Donnington Castle during the Civil War, 1643–6. Simpkin, Marshall.
- O'Siochru, Michael (2008). God's Executioner – Oliver Cromwell and the Conquest of Ireland. London: Faber & Faber.
- Ram, Robert (1644). The Souldiers Catechism: Composed for the Parliaments Army, Consisting of Two Parts Wherein are Chiefly Taught: 1. the Justification, 2. the Qualifications of Our Souldiers. Written for the Incouragement and Instruction of All that Have Taken Up Armes in this Cause of God and His People, Especially the Common Souldiers. J. Wright. OL 1678135M.
- Riley, Jonathon P. (2014). The Last Ironsides: The English Expedition to Portugal, 1662–1668. Helion. ISBN 978-1-909982-20-8. OL 28109076M.
- Roberts, Keith (2005). Cromwell's War Machine. Pen and Sword Military. ISBN 1-84415-094-1.
- Roberts, Stephen K (2017). Surnames beginning 'V' in The Cromwell Association Online Directory of Parliamentarian Army Officers. British History Online.
- Rogers, Colonel H.C.B. (1968). Battles and Generals of the Civil Wars. Seeley Service & Company.
- Royle, Trevor (2004). Civil War: The Wars of the Three Kingdoms 1638–1660. Abacus. ISBN 978-0-349-11564-1.
- Simpson, John (3 May 2013). "The Oxford English Dictionary and its chief word detective". BBC News Magazine. BBC.
- Smith, D. (1994). Constitutional Royalism and the search for settlement, c. 1640–1649. Cambridge University Press. ISBN 978-0511522819.
- Temple, Robert KG (1986). "The Original Officer List of the New Model Army". Historical Research. 59 (139): 50–77. doi:10.1111/j.1468-2281.1986.tb01179.x.
- Tucker, Spencer C. (2009). A Global Chronology of Conflict: From the Ancient World to the Modern Middle East (illustrated ed.). ABC-CLIO. p. 634. ISBN 978-1-85109-672-5. OL 24032712M.
- Wallace, David C. (2013). Twenty-Two Turbulent Years 1639–1661. Upfront Publishing. ISBN 978-1780356600.
- Wanklyn, Malcolm (2014). "Choosing Officers for the New Model Army, February to April 1645". Journal of the Society for Army Historical Research. 92 (370): 109–125. JSTOR 44232556.
- Wedgwood, C.V. (1983) [1958]. The King's War, 1641–1647. Penguin Classics. ISBN 978-0-14-006991-4.
- Wheeler, James Scott (1999). Cromwell in Ireland. St. Martin's Press. ISBN 978-0-312-22550-6.
- Young, Peter; Holmes, Richard (2000). The English Civil War:A Military History of the Three Civil Wars, 1642–1651. Ware, Hertfordshire: Wordsworth Editions. ISBN 1-84022-222-0.
