= Richard Layte =

Irish academic

Richard Layte is a professor of sociology at Trinity College Dublin, appointed in 2014.

Previously he was a research professor at the Economic and Social Research Institute (ESRI) in Dublin, Ireland, where he coordinated the research programme on health.

Richard Layte is a leading researcher on the way in which education, work and institutional factors (e.g., social welfare systems) affect the risk of poverty, disadvantage, and poor health. He has published widely on the measurement and analysis of poverty, deprivation and social exclusion, social class and social mobility. More recent work is focused on inequalities in health behaviour and health care.

Richard Layte regularly appears in the media.
