= Jane Stout =

British entomologist and ecologist

Jane Stout FRES
- Education: University of Southampton (BSc, PhD)
- Scientific career
- Workplaces: Trinity College Dublin

Jane Stout FRES is an Entomologist and Ecologist in Ireland. She is a professor of Ecology and Vice President for Biodiversity & Climate Action, at Trinity College Dublin, is current President of the Royal Entomological Society and is an expert in pollination ecology.

== Education and career ==
Stout grew up in rural Northamptonshire, and studied an environmental science BSc at the University of Southampton, later graduating with a PhD in the foraging ecology of bumblebees in 1999.

Jane was a postdoctoral researcher and teaching fellow at the University of Southampton, moving to Trinity College Dublin in 2001 to be a postdoctoral researcher and from 2003 lecturer, In 2011 she was elected a fellow and in 2015 she was made Professor in Botany.

== Research ==
Stout's work is on pollinator ecology, biodiversity and land management.

In 2015 her work helped initiate the All-Ireland Pollinator Plan, aiming to identify actions to make Ireland more pollinator friendly. In 2017 she set up apiary on the TCD campus, to compare honey from urban and rural honeybee hives. She has also researched the benefits of Irish honey, the value of pollinators in Ireland, the effects of pesticides, and pesticide residues on bees, as well as working on longterm data on pollinators in Ireland.

Stout wrote a regular Irish Times column, including articles on the need for farmers and ecologists to work together, and why people and nature need each other., in 2020 she carried out a biodiversity assessment for President Higgins, and was head of the expert review into the future of Ireland's National Parks and Wildlife Service (NPWS) in 2021, which reported neglect and under funding and resulted in a 2022 action plan.

Jane has also published research on the benefits of forest, she leads the first project looking at natural capital and catchment management and more recently has worked on projects to improve the local environment in Dublin.

== Awards ==
Stout won the British Ecological Society's award for Ecological Engagement 2017.

In September 2023 Stout was confirmed as President Elect of the Royal Entomological Society, she will become President from September 2024.

In December 2023 she is a plenary speaker at the BES's Annual Meeting in Belfast, speaking about '12 Months in Ecology'.
