= Sláintecare =

Proposed reform of the healthcare system of Ireland

Sláintecare is a reform of the healthcare system of Ireland. Pronounced /ˈslɔːntʃəkɛər, ˈslɑːn-/ SLAWN-chə-kair, SLAHN-, the name is derived from sláinte [ˈsˠl̪ˠaːn̠ʲtʲə], the Irish word for "health." The intent of the Sláintecare reforms is to achieve a universal single-tier health and social care system, which provides equitable access to services based on need, and not ability to pay. The Sláintecare programme enjoys the support of all parties in the Oireachtas.

== Reform programmes ==
In its Sláintecare Action Plan 2023, the Department of Health identified two reform programmes it was prioritising, both composed of individual projects.

=== Reform Programme 1: Improving Safe, Timely Access to Care, and Promoting Health & Wellbeing ===
1. Implement the Health Service Capacity Review (2018) including Healthy Living. Enhanced Community Care and Hospital Productivity
2. Scale and mainstream Integration Innovation
3. Streamline Care Pathways, from prevention to discharge
4. Develop Elective Ambulatory Care Centres in Dublin, Cork, and Galway
5. Implement a Multi-annual Waiting List Reduction Plan
6. Implement the eHealth Programme
7. Remove private care from public hospitals - implement the Sláintecare Consultant Contract

A map of the planned Regional Health Areas.

=== Reform Programme 2: Addressing Health Inequalities ===
1. Develop a Population Health Approach for Service Planning and Funding
2. Rollout Sláintecare Healthy Communities Programme
3. Develop Regional Health Areas
4. Implement Obesity Policy and Action Plan 2016 - 2025

On 1 March 2024, six new Regional Health Areas will be established. They are:

- HSE Dublin and North East
  - North Dublin, Meath, Louth, Monaghan, Cavan
- HSE Dublin and Midlands
  - Longford, Westmeath, Offaly, Laois, Kildare, Wicklow, and parts of Dublin
- HSE Dublin and South East
  - Tipperary South, Waterford, Kilkenny, Carlow, Wexford, *Wicklow, part of South Dublin
- HSE South West
  - Kerry and Cork
- HSE Mid West
  - Limerick, Tipperary and Clare
- HSE West and North West
  - Donegal, Sligo, Leitrim, Roscommon, Mayo, and Galway, *Cavan

West County Wicklow will remain aligned with Dublin and South East, and far west County Cavan will remain aligned with West and North West.

== History ==
=== Initial proposal, planning, and early rollout: 2011–2020 ===
The newly elected Irish government committed itself in March 2011 to reform the two-tier structure of national health service in response to public discontent with austerity measures from 2008 onwards. Since public funding of health provision was reduced between 2009 and 2013 to meet payment obligations arising from the state's budget deficit, citizens faced higher medical charges and extended waiting lists.

In reaction to this development, the coalition government of Fine Gael and the Labour Party declared to introduce “a universal single-tiered health service, which guarantees access based on need, not income… through Universal Health Insurance.” The published government plan, outlined in the 2014 document “The Path to UHC – The White Paper”, foresaw introducing compulsory private health insurance based on managed competition between insurance companies to abolish the distinction between public and private patient status. Key features of the policy entailed mandatory health insurance for every citizen under free choice of insurer as well as entitlement to the same package of care, covering primary and acute hospital services. Further, patients should be charged in turn insurance premium irrespective of age or risk profile and additionally have the right to change their insurance membership on an annual basis. Those citizens who are unable to afford the amount of premium would have qualified for subsidies to cover the required premium payments by a National Insurance fund.

The implementation of the proposed model of universal health insurance was supposed to be conducted by 2019. However, after a public consultation procedure regarding the reform initiatives the plan of universal health insurance was abandoned by the Irish administration in November 2015 due to projections that the envisaged system would be too costly and would still require the highest share of funds by general taxation. According to the state department of health, the implied costs of universal health insurance would have led to approximately 11% higher expenditures than the existing system. After the Irish parliamentary election of 2016, Fine Gael formed a minority government supported by independent parliamentarians. Social Democrat TD Róisín Shortall founded in June 2016 an all-party “Committee on the Future of Healthcare” following an initiative by the health department with the aim to identify an appropriate approach for establishing universal healthcare in Ireland. The committee was supported by an academic team from Trinity College Dublin to analyse submissions made within 30 public hearings in the course of the public consultation process. In May 2017 the committee published its final report entitled “Committee on the Future of Health, Sláintecare Report”, which specified universal healthcare based on the following definition:

A universal healthcare system will provide population, promotive, preventative, primary, curative, rehabilitative and palliative health and social care services to the entire population of Ireland, ensuring timely access to quality, effective, integrated services on the basis of clinical need.

— Committee on the Future of Health, Sláintecare Report

The document entails a proposed ten-year plan for reforming the Irish health system towards universal healthcare. It consists of five sections, covering Population health profile, Entitlements and Access to Healthcare, Integrated care, Funding and Implementation. The report foresees the provision of health cards called Carta Sláinte to every citizen, granting access to primary care free of charges at specified local entities preferably outside of hospitals. This system is planned to be funded by taxation, requiring an increase of public health spending and further infrastructure investment of approximately 3 billion Euros. The submitted plan was debated twice in the parliament in 2017 and the Irish government decided to found an official implementation office to appoint a head of the organisation as well as to develop a drafted implementation plan by December 2017. Laura Magahy was appointed as director of the Sláintecare programme in 2018. She resigned from her position in September 2021.

In December 2019, Minister for Health Simon Harris estimated that the reforms would be carried out by 2030 as a result of the government's decision to only issue new contracts for public-only consultants, although an exact timeline on how long it would take to switch over to an entirely public health service would depend on the uptake. By 2030 he expected the government would have recruited an additional 1,000 consultants.

=== COVID-19 pandemic and onwards: 2020–present ===
In June 2020, Róisín Shortall, chair of the committee which established the plan, said that delays on funding until 2022 meant the plan "now seems to be completely relegated to some point in the future". In the Autumn of 2021, several members of the Sláintecare Implementation Advisory Council resigned, including Professor Anthony O’Connor who predicted that the project was "doomed to fail".

In 2022, six new Public Health Areas were launched as a step towards the Regional Health Areas (RHAs) outlined in the plan, with the appointment of five Area Directors of Public Health at the medical consultant grade, and with the sixth expected shortly thereafter in the following weeks. The design of the six RHAs was expected to be finished in 2022, with a phased introduction in 2023, and full operation in 2024.

Project 5 of Programme 1 focuses on the reduction of waiting lists. In 2022, the government Waiting List Action Plan (WLAP) sought a net reduction in overall waiting list numbers of 132,000 patients, or 18%. The actual reduction achieved was 4%, which the Department of Health pointed out was the first annual reduction in overall waiting list numbers since 2015. In 2023, the government WLAP sought to reduce overall waiting list numbers by 10%, but achieved an actual reduction of 3%.

Project 7 of Programme 1, which focuses on transitioning consultants in public hospitals to the Public-Only Consultant Contract (POCC), began rollout in March 2023. By April 2024, uptake of the POCC was over 50%. However uptake remained notably lower in the Mid West region. By January 2025, the POCC had reached a national uptake level of 60%.

By September 2025, 3,000 additional staff had been recruited. A network of specialist hubs was established aimed at managing patients’ conditions close to home and avoiding unnecessary hospital admissions. Radically shorter waiting times for diagnosis of some conditions had been achieved. 40% of total healthcare funding still going to hospitals and 21% to community providers, which is not much different from before the reforms, though more activity was being delivered in the community. The biggest issue was said to be integrating patient records to allow more seamless care between hospitals and community services.

In February 2026, Irish Hospital Consultants Association President Prof Gabrielle Colleran said that, with only two years left in the 10-year plan (due to end in 2027), Sláintecare had achieved some objectives and not others, noting that it "hasn’t delivered on the capacity side". When asked for comment on what comes after Sláintecare, a Department of Health spokesperson said that Sláintecare Progress Report 2025 and Sláintecare Action Plan 2026 were in development.
