= Aoife Gowen =

Academic Professor specialising in Biosystems and Food Engineering

- Born: Kilkenny, Ireland
- Education: B.A. – Trinity College Dublin (TCD) (1996–2000); MSc – Dublin City University (DCU) (2000–2001); PhD – Dublin Institute of Technology (2002– 2006)

Aoife Gowen is currently a professor in the University College Dublin (UCD) School of Biosystems and Food Engineering. Her area of research covers topics such as applications of hyperspectral imaging and chemometrics to biological systems.

Gowen's expertise lies in hyperspectral imaging, a method which, images objects and extracts information from each pixel, about wavelengths across the electromagnetic spectrum. The results can give insights into the 'unseen' properties and chemistry of the object.

== Early life and education ==
Aoife Gowen was born and raised in County Kilkenny. Upon completion of secondary school, Gowen began to study Theoretical Physics in Trinity College Dublin, graduating with a Bachelor of Arts in 2000. Gowen went on to pursue a master's in financial maths in Dublin City University (DCU) graduating in 2001. In 2002, Gowen began in a new area of research, the field of Food Science, attaining her doctoral degree in food science from the Dublin Institute of Technology (DIT) in 2006. Her PhD thesis, completed in 2006, was centred on mathematical modelling of food quality parameters and optimization of food process operations. Gowen then spent some time as a post-doctoral researcher, investigating the intersection of near infrared spectroscopy, chemical imaging and chemometrics for characterization of biological systems.

== Career research ==
Gowen joined UCD in 2007 as a postdoctoral researcher, working on hyperspectral imaging (HSI). Her research involves the application and growth of multivariate analysis and image processing techniques for non-destructive assessment of biological products using HSI.

In 2010 Gowen spent two years in Kobe University, Japan, studying and researching hyperspectral imaging. This research gave rise to her current endeavour, which is probing what happens to water at interfaces where it interacts with various materials.

By procuring equipment and engaging in the transfer of knowledge through international collaborations with leading worldwide researchers in HSI, Ms Gowen was able to set up the first facility for Hyperspectral Imaging for food quality analysis in Ireland and currently leads the UCD spectral imaging research group.

Gowen has also been a part of the production of research papers, such as a paper titled "Identification of Magnesium oxychloride Cement Biomaterial Heterogeneity using Raman Chemical Mapping and NIR Hyperspectral Chemical Imaging".

== Awards and recognition ==
Gowen is also a benefactor of a European Union Marie Curie International Outgoing Fellowship grant.

On 8 March 2017, Gowen was included in an article titled "25 of Ireland’s phenomenal women of engineering".

Gowen was one of three Irish researchers who secured €2m in EU R&D funding each as part of the prestigious European Research Council (ERC) Grants in 2013.

== Degrees ==
- B.A. – Trinity College Dublin (TCD) (1996–2000)
- MSc – Dublin City University (DCU) (2000–2001)
- PhD – Dublin Institute of Technology (2002–2006)
