= Melatu Uche Okorie =

Nigerian-born Irish author

- Born: 1975 (age 49–50); Enugu, Nigeria
- Occupation: Writer
- Notable work: This Hostel Life

Melatu Uche Okorie (born 1975) is a Nigerian-Irish author and member of the Arts Council of Ireland. Her 2018 short story collection, This Hostel Life, was shortlisted for the Sunday Independent Newcomer of the Year award at the Irish Book Awards, and adapted into an operatic work by the Irish National Opera.

== Early life and education ==
Melatu Uche Okorie was born in 1975 in Enugu, Nigeria. She grew up in a household with her mother and several siblings, and obtained a degree in English before leaving Nigeria. Okorie moved to Ireland in 2006 with her infant daughter and lived in the direct provision system, which was when she began writing. Okorie obtained an Mphil in creative writing from Trinity College Dublin and is studying for a PhD in the college of Education.

== Writing ==
In 2009, Okorie won the Metro Éireann Writing Award for the story "Gathering Thoughts". Okorie's first book, This Hostel Life, was published by Skein Press in Ireland in May 2018. The book features an invented Nigerian pidgin English patois. It was launched at the International Literature Festival, where Okorie discussed the migrant experience with Nikesh Shukla. This Hostel Life was bought by Virago Press in 2019, and adapted into an operatic work by the Irish National Opera. Her work has been published in LIT Journal, College Green Magazine, and Dublin: Ten Journeys One Destination, Alms on the Highway.

In 2019, Okorie was interviewed about her writing practice by Laureate for Irish Fiction, Sebastian Barry. The same year, Yes, We Still Drink Coffee! was published. This is a collection of works by female writers including Okorie, Catherine Dunne, Hilary Fannin, Lia Mills and Sheila O'Flanagan who were paired with activists.

== Advocacy ==
Okorie is a board member of the National Network of Migrant Women in Ireland, and is a creative writing workshop facilitator for children and young people.

== Awards and recognition ==
In 2018, This Hostel Life was nominated for the Sunday Independent Newcomer of the Year award at the Irish Book Awards. In 2019, Okorie was appointed to the Arts Council.
