= Sylvia O'Brien (soprano) =

Irish singer

- Born: Dublin, Ireland
- Education: Trinity College Dublin (Choral scholar) • Dundalk Institute of Technology (MA)
- Occupation: Soprano

Sylvia O'Brien is a Dublin-born soprano.

== Education ==
O'Brien was a choral scholar at Trinity College Dublin and sang in the choirs of both the Anglican Christ Church Cathedral and the Roman Catholic St. Theresa's Church in Dublin. She studied for a master's degree in contemporary vocal techniques at the Dundalk Institute of Technology.

== Career ==
O'Brien made her operatic debut in 2004 as the governess in Benjamin Britten's The Turn of the Screw with Opera Theatre Company, Ireland's national touring company (now part of Irish National Opera).

O'Brien has sung leading roles with English Touring Opera, including Gabiella (Countess Zedlau) in Strauss' Vienna Spirit and Costanze in Mozart's Die Entführung aus dem Serail.

She has also sung as a soloist with the Irish Chamber Orchestra (Bach's St. John Passion, 2008) and the RTÉ National Symphony Orchestra (Morton Feldman's, Neither, at the RTÉ Living Music Festival 2006).

She has sung with several of Ireland's leading contemporary music groups including the Syrius Trio, with whom she toured Ireland in 2006 singing Seven Romances on Verses by Alexander Blok in an all-Shostakovich programme, followed by a performance in the Weill Recital Hall at Carnegie Hall.
