= Frisson =

Psychophysiological response to rewarding auditory or visual stimuli

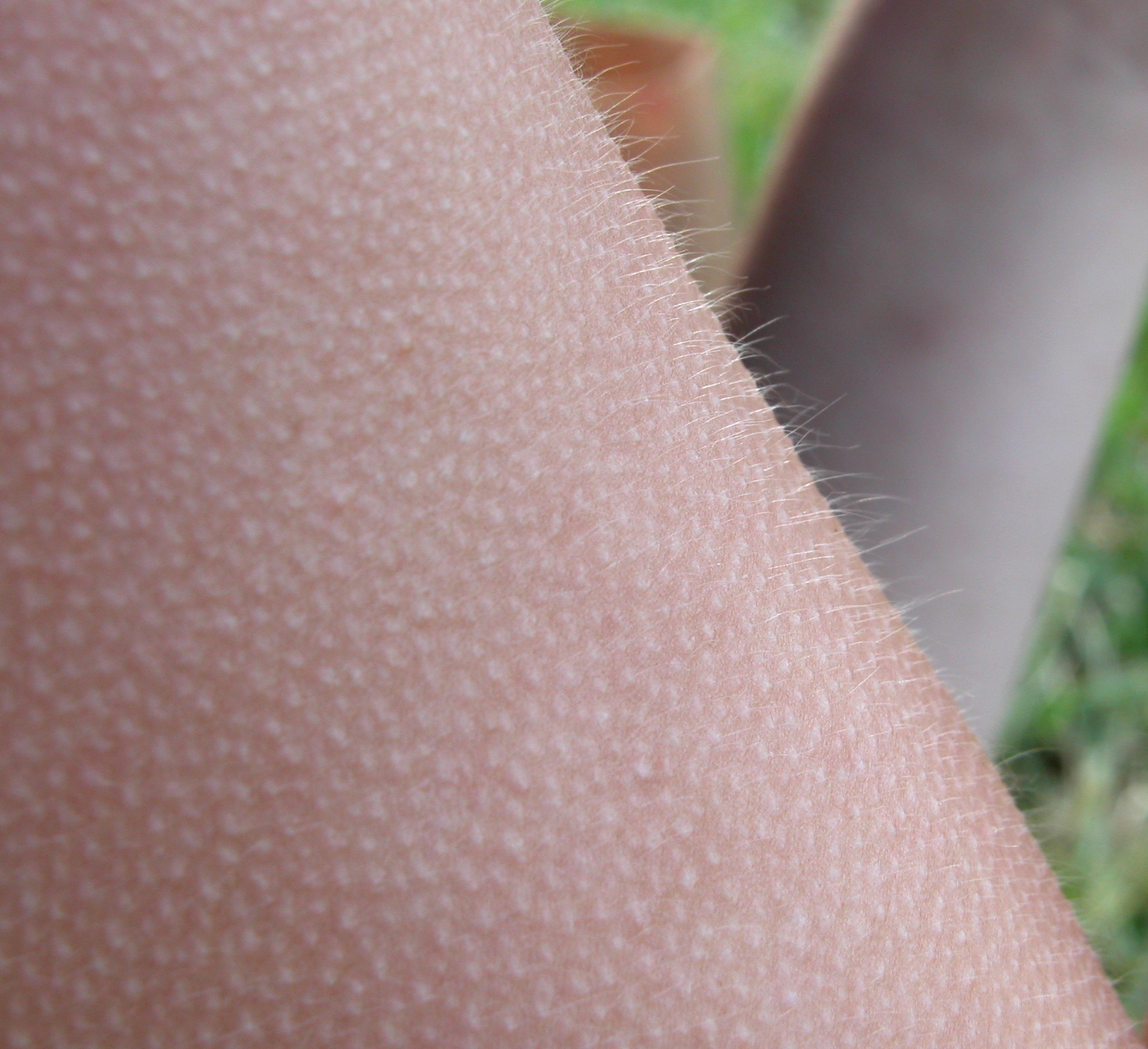
Piloerection (goose bumps), the physical part of frisson

Frisson (UK: /ˈfriːsɒn/ FREE-son, US: /friːˈsoʊn/ free-SOHN French: [fʁisɔ̃]; French for "shiver"), also known as aesthetic chills or psychogenic shivers, is a psychophysiological response to rewarding stimuli (including music, films, stories, people, photos, and rituals) that often induces a pleasurable or otherwise positively-valenced affective state and transient paresthesia (skin tingling or chills), sometimes along with piloerection (goose bumps) and mydriasis (pupil dilation). The sensation can occur as a mildly to moderately pleasurable emotional response to music with skin tingling.

The psychological component (i.e., the pleasurable feeling) and physiological components (i.e., paresthesia, piloerection, and pupil dilation) of the response are mediated by the reward system and sympathetic nervous system, respectively. The stimuli that produce this response are specific to each individual. Frisson is of short duration, lasting only a few seconds. Typical stimuli include loud passages of music and passages—such as appoggiaturas and sudden modulation—that violate some level of musical expectation. While frisson is usually known for being evoked by experiences with music, the phenomenon can additionally be triggered with poetry, videos, beauty in nature or art, eloquent speeches, the practice of science (mainly physics and mathematics), and can also be triggered on command by some people without any external stimuli. During a frisson, a sensation of chills or tingling is felt on the skin of the lower back, shoulders, neck, and/or arms. The sensation of chills is sometimes experienced as a series of 'waves' moving up the back in rapid succession and commonly described as "shivers up the spine." Hair follicles may also undergo piloerection.

Frisson may be enhanced by the amplitude of the music and the temperature of the environment. Cool listening rooms and cinemas may enhance the experience.

Experiencing musical frisson is associated with increased connectivity between the sections of the brain responsible for processing auditory information (specifically the anterior insula) and for reward processing: in other words, the greater the volume of white matter connectivity between those areas of the brain, the more likely an individual is to experience chills. Experiencing musical frisson is also associated with openness to experience.

== Causes ==
=== Violations of musical expectancy ===
Rhythmic, dynamic, harmonic, and/or melodic violations of a person's explicit or implicit expectations are associated with musical frisson as a prerequisite. Loud, very high or low frequency, quickly varying sounds, or unexpected harmonies, moments of modulations, and appoggiaturas in a melody's succession have been shown to arouse the autonomic nervous system (ANS). Activation of the ANS has a consistently strong correlation with frisson, as one study showed that an opioid antagonist could block frisson from music. Leonard Meyer, a prominent philosopher of music, argues that music's ability to evoke emotion in the listener stems from its ability to meet and break expectations.

=== Dance performances ===
Frisson can be induced by spectating a dance performance, which involves both observing the dancers and hearing the music, corresponding to two sense modalities: vision and audition, respectively. This scenario provides the means for frisson to occur, yet it is not guaranteed that the conflict between audition and vision will trigger frisson.

=== Emotional contagion ===
Frisson can also be a product of emotional contagion. Within the context of music, emotional contagion involves various musical devices, such as tonality, rhythm, and lyrics that imply emotion, triggering similar emotions in the listener. In "The Emotional Power of Music: Multidisciplinary perspectives on musical arousal, expression, and social control," Stephen Davies suggests that "music is expressive because we experience it as presenting the kind of carriage, gait, or demeanor that can be symptomatic of states such as sassy sexuality, happiness, sadness, anger and so on."

=== Environment and social context ===
Frisson can also be amplified by one's environment and by the social context that the piece has been listened to. For example, if one listens to a movie soundtrack in a cinema, the overall volume and the film's story will provide intentional context, likely creating deeper emotional feelings of frisson in the listener. The culture and nationality of both the piece and the composer will affect the levels of frisson felt, or if frisson is even felt at all. If one is very familiar with music built on established Western musical traditions, deviations will violate the listener's expectations. If one is from a non-Western culture, deviations from western musical tradition may prove to have no effect on the listener. Jeanette Bicknell, writing for the Journal of Consciousness Studies, wrote, "Different musical cultures are based upon different patterns of tonal and rhythmic organization. These patterns of musical structure and meaning are social constructions that evolved through human musical practice."

== Neural substrates ==
Experimental studies have also shown that tingling during frisson is accompanied by increased electrodermal activity (skin conductance) – which is mediated via the activation of the sympathetic nervous system – and that the intensity of tingling is positively correlated with the magnitude of sympathetic activation. Frisson is also associated with piloerection, enlarged pupil diameter, and physiological arousal, all of which are mediated by activation of the sympathetic nervous system. Despite this, recent research has shown that self-reported chills do not correspond with observable piloerection, suggesting that they are independent phenomena.

Neuroimaging studies have found that the intensity of tingling is positively correlated with the magnitude of brain activity in specific regions of the reward system, including the nucleus accumbens, orbitofrontal cortex, and insular cortex. All three of these brain structures are known to contain a hedonic hotspot, a region of the brain that is responsible for producing pleasure cognition. Since music-induced euphoria can occur without the sensation of tingling or piloerection, the authors of one review hypothesized that the emotional response to music during a frisson evokes a sympathetic response that is experienced as a tingling sensation.

== See also ==
- Art and emotion § Aesthetic chills
- Autonomous sensory meridian response (ASMR)
- Euphoria § Music euphoria
- Stendhal syndrome
