= Paradox of fiction =

Philosophical dilemma

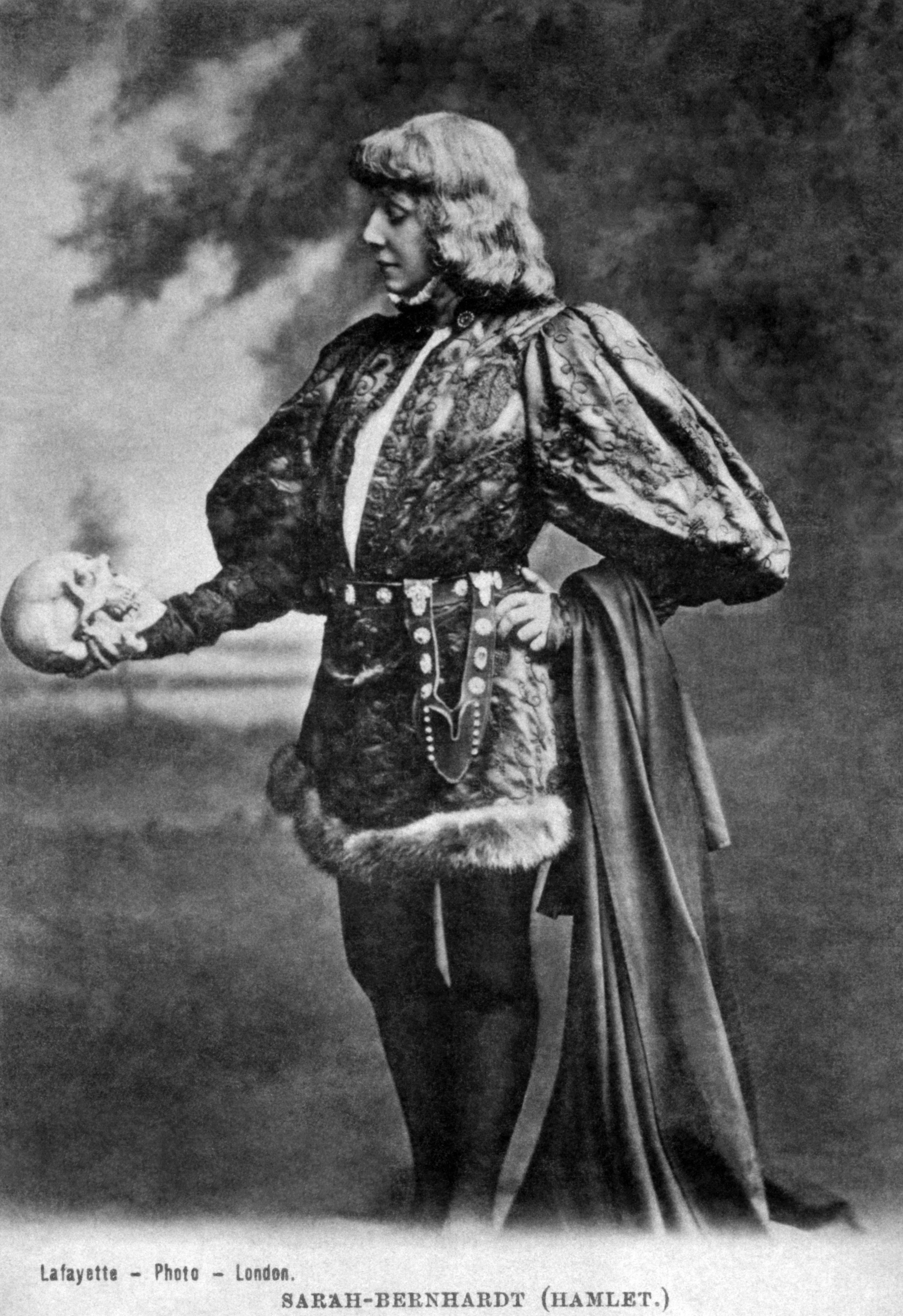
The paradox of fiction asks why people experience strong emotions when, for example, they are watching Prince Hamlet on stage, while at the same time knowing that Hamlet is not a real person and it is merely an actor.

The paradox of fiction, or the paradox of emotional response to fiction, is a philosophical dilemma that questions how people can experience strong emotions to fictional things. The primary question asked is the following: How are people moved by things which do not exist? The paradox draws upon a set of three premises that seem to be true prima facie but upon closer inspection are said to produce a contradiction. Although the emotional experience of fictional things in general has been discussed in philosophy since Plato, the paradox was first suggested by Colin Radford and Michael Weston in their 1975 paper "How Can We Be Moved by the Fate of Anna Karenina?". Since Radford and Weston's original paper, they and others have continued the discussion by giving the problem slightly differing formulations and solutions.

== The paradox ==
The basic paradox is as follows:

1. People have emotional responses to characters, objects, events etc. which they know to be fictitious.
2. In order for people to be emotionally moved, they must believe that these characters, objects, or events, truly exist.
3. No person who takes characters or events to be fictional at the same time believes that they are real.

The paradox is that all three premises taken individually seem to be true, but cannot all be true at the same time. If any two points (e.g. 1 and 3) are taken to be true, then the third (e.g. 2) must either be false or else produce a contradiction.

== Origin ==
The idea that there is a problem with attitudes towards fictional narratives is present in Plato's Ion (c. 4th century BC) and Saint Augustine's Confessions (4th century AD).

In 1975, philosophers Colin Radford and Michael Weston published their paper "How Can We Be Moved by the Fate of Anna Karenina?" In it, Radford and Weston discuss the idea of emotional responses to fiction, drawing upon the titular character from Leo Tolstoy's novel Anna Karenina. Their central inquiry is how people can be moved by things that do not exist. In their paper, they concluded that people's emotional responses to fiction are irrational. In 1978, American philosopher Kendall Walton published the paper "Fearing Fictions", in which he addresses Radford and Weston's paradox. This paper served as the impetus for Walton's make-believe theory, his most notable idea in philosophy. The conversation that Radford, Weston, and Walton started on the topic of emotional responses to fiction has continued and evolved to this day.

== Developments ==
The debate about the paradox of fiction has evolved immensely since its introduction by Radford and Walton. When the paradox was first formulated, the cognitive theory of emotions was a dominant force in philosophical thought. For cognitivists, emotions involve judgments or beliefs. For example, one's anger at somebody involves the judgment or belief of wrongdoing by that somebody. Similarly, premise 2 involves the judgment that fictitious characters truly exist. Therefore, for cognitivists, premise 2 seems just as true as the other premises and subsequently there is a true paradox, which is resolved by rejecting premise 1.

However, nowadays, cognitivism is not as influential and very few people accept premise 2. This is in part due to the strong nature of the premise that results from the phrase "truly exists". People are emotionally moved by things and people from the past as well as the hypothetical future, including things that have not happened and may not ever happen. Also, people seem to be capable of being moved by irrational emotions caused by phobias. These disprove the "truly exists" phrase. Instead of cognitivist ideas, academics advocate other theories such as appraisal, perceptual, and feeling theories. In these theories, emotions do not involve judgments or beliefs and consequently premise 2 is not true prima facie, nullifying the paradox of fiction entirely.

Some academics who propose solutions to the paradox that involve the denial of premise 1 or 3 even deny premise 2 as well. For example, although Walton argues for the denial of premise 1 because the reader does not literally pity the character Anna, he also questions the truthfulness of premise 2 because of cases of irrational emotion.

Despite the popular rejection of premise 2, academics are still interested in the paradox and seriously consider other solutions. Robert Stecker argues that studying the paradox is nevertheless important for understanding people's emotional responses to fiction.

Future areas of research include the paradox of fiction in video games. Important questions include the following. "How does this idea challenge the truism that one cannot interact with fictional characters?" "Are emotional responses to videogame characters different from emotional responses to traditional fiction characters?"

== Responses and proposed solutions ==
The various proposed solutions to the paradox can be divided into three basic groups:

=== Pretense theory ===
First is the pretend or the simulation theories, proposed by Kendall Walton in his paper "Fearing Fictions" (1978) and built upon in subsequent works.

The pretend theory denies premise 1, that people have emotional responses to fictitious things. The theory argues that people do not experience real emotions with fiction but rather something less intense. People experience quasi-emotions that they imagine to be real emotions. For example, when watching a horror movie where the monster makes an attack towards the viewer (towards the camera), the viewer can be startled but does not truly fear for their life.

Walton's view takes the assumption that one who experiences genuine emotion towards an "entity" must believe that said entity both exists and has features such that the emotion is warranted. For example, if one is to genuinely display fear towards an entity, one must believe that the entity exists and has features such as being dangerous, warranting the emotion of fear. However, since people consuming fiction usually do not believe in the genuine existence of the fictitious things or events, one cannot feel genuine emotion.

=== Thought theory ===
Second is the thought theories, for example from Peter Lamarque, Noël Carroll, and Robert J. Yanal.

The thought theories deny premise 2 and claim that people can have genuine emotions from things even if they do not believe them to exist.

=== Illusion theory ===
Third is the illusion or realist theories, for example from Alan Paskow.

The illusion theories deny premise 3 and claim that, in a way, the fictional characters are real. They suggest that Samuel Taylor Coleridge was right in saying that fiction involves a "willing suspension of disbelief", i.e. believing in the fiction while engaging with it.

== Scientific investigations ==
The paradox of fiction has also been investigated under the framework of affective neuroscience. Several studies reported a decreased emotional response for emotional stimuli believed to be fictional (e.g., involving actors and stuntmen, movie makeup or CGI), suggesting a quantitative, rather than qualitative, modulation of emotion by fiction. In his doctoral thesis, Dominique Makowski denies the three premisses of the paradox and suggests reframing the issue in the context of emotion regulation, as a regulatory mechanism referred to as fictional reappraisal.

== See also ==
- List of paradoxes
- Mimesis
- Suspension of disbelief
- Fiction theory
