= Suspension of disbelief =

Allowing imagination when reading or viewing a fictional story

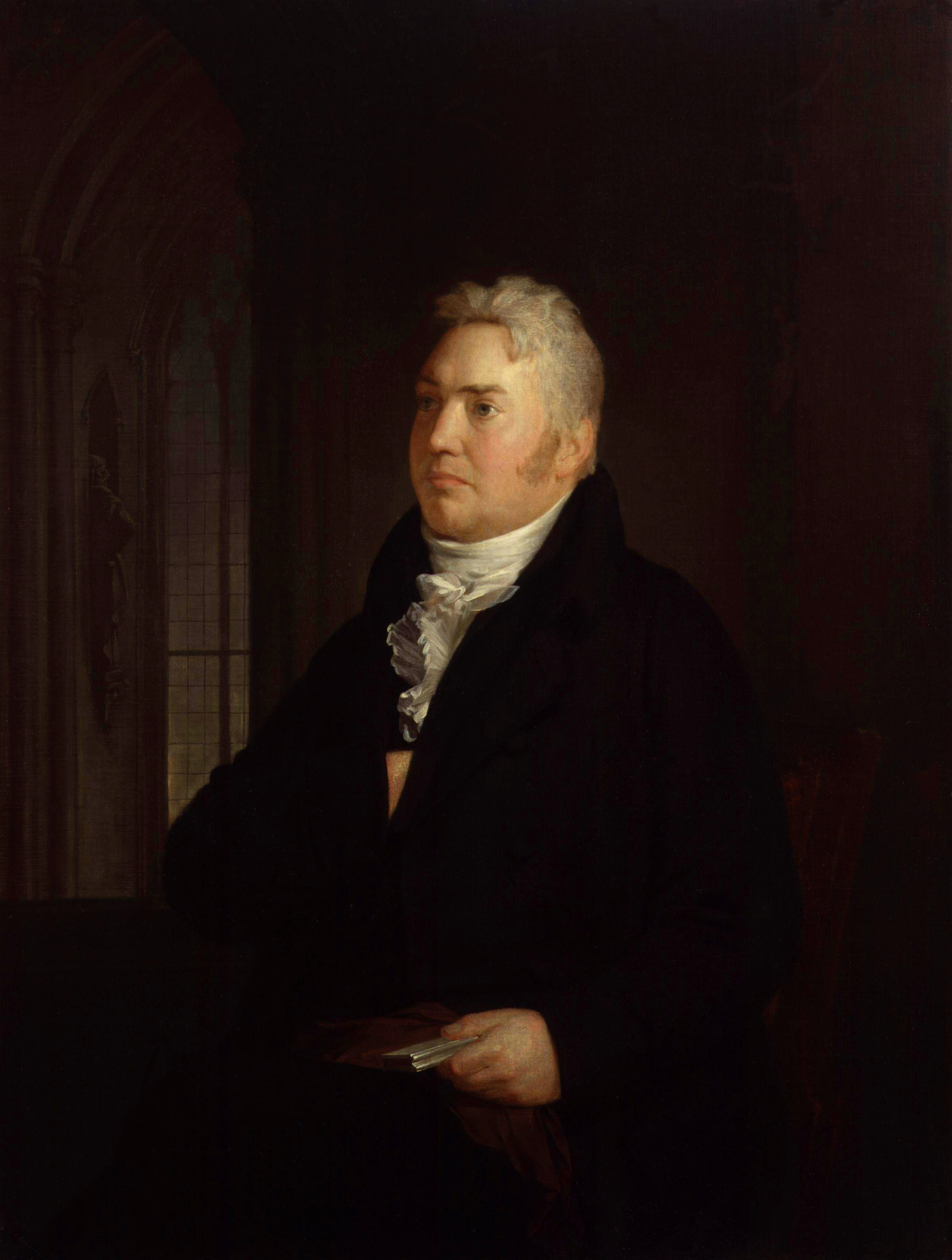
Samuel Taylor Coleridge, a philosopher and poet known for his influence on English literature, coined the turn-of-phrase and elaborated upon it.

Suspension of disbelief, often willing suspension of disbelief, is a person's intentional setting aside of critical thinking, logic, or real-life expectations when experiencing a work of fiction, in order to better enjoy it and be absorbed into its narrative. Historically, the concept originates in the Greco-Roman principles of theatre, wherein the audience ignores the unreality of fiction to experience catharsis from the actions and experiences of characters.

The phrase was coined and elaborated upon by the English poet and philosopher Samuel Taylor Coleridge in his 1817 work Biographia Literaria: "that willing suspension of disbelief for the moment, which constitutes poetic faith".

== Origin ==
The phrase first appeared in English poet and aesthetic philosopher Samuel Taylor Coleridge's Biographia Literaria, where he suggested that if an author could infuse a "human interest and a semblance of truth" into a story with implausible elements, the reader would willingly suspend judgement concerning the implausibility of the narrative. Coleridge was interested in returning fantastic elements to poetry and developed the concept to support how a modern, enlightened audience would continue to enjoy such types of literature. Coleridge observed that his work, such as his contributions to the Lyrical Ballads, his collaboration with William Wordsworth, essentially involved attempting to explain supernatural characters and events in plausible terms so that implausible characters and events of the imagination can seem to be truthful and present a greater contrast between fiction and reality. Coleridge also referred to this concept as "poetic faith", citing the concept as a feeling analogous to the supernatural, which stimulates the mind's faculties regardless of the irrationality of what is being understood.

Coleridge recalled:

It was agreed, that my endeavours should be directed to persons and characters supernatural, or at least romantic, yet so as to transfer from our inward nature a human interest and a semblance of truth sufficient to procure for these shadows of imagination that willing suspension of disbelief for the moment, which constitutes poetic faith. Mr. Wordsworth on the other hand was to propose to himself as his object, to give the charm of novelty to things of every day, and to excite a feeling analogous to the supernatural, by awakening the mind's attention from the lethargy of custom, and directing it to the loveliness and the wonders of the world before us.

This concept had previously been understood in antiquity, particularly in the Roman theoretical concerns of Horace and Cicero who wrote in a time of increasing skepticism about the supernatural. In Horace's Ars Poetica, he used the quotation Ut pictura poesis, meaning "as is painting so is poetry". According to David Chandler, Coleridge also originally drew his notion from Johann Jakob Brucker's Historia Critica Philosophiae which cited the phrase "assensus suspensione" ("suspension of assent"); Brucker's phrase was itself a modernization of the phrase "adsensionis retentio" ("a holding back of assent") used by Cicero in his Academica.

== Concept ==
The traditional concept of the suspension of disbelief as proposed by Coleridge has been claimed — despite Coleridge's own statement quoted above — to be not about suspending disbelief in the reality of fictional characters or events, but the suspension of disbelief in phenomena that are regarded as implausible. This can be demonstrated in the way a reader suspends disbelief in supernatural phenomena themselves — simulating the feelings of a character that is experiencing the phenomena in the narrative of a story — rather than simply the implausibility of the phenomena in a story.

The phrase "suspension of disbelief" came to be used more loosely in the later 20th century, often used to imply that the burden was on the reader, rather than the writer, to achieve it. This might be used to refer to the willingness of the audience to overlook the limitations of a medium, so that these do not interfere with the acceptance of those premises. These premises may also lend to the engagement of the mind and perhaps proposition of thoughts, ideas, art and theories. With a film, for instance, the viewer has to ignore the reality that they are viewing a staged performance and temporarily accept it as their reality in order to be entertained. Early black-and-white films are an example of visual media that require the audience to suspend their disbelief for this reason. Cognitive estrangement in fiction involves using a person's ignorance to promote suspension of disbelief.

== Examples in literature ==
Suspension of disbelief is sometimes said to be an essential component of live theater, where it was recognized by Shakespeare, who refers to it in the Prologue to Henry V: "make imaginary puissance [...] 'tis your thoughts that now must deck our kings [...] turning the accomplishment of many years into an hourglass". Poetry and fiction involving the supernatural had gone out of fashion to a large extent in the 18th century, in part due to the declining belief in witches and other supernatural agents among the educated classes, who embraced the rational approach to the world offered by the new science. Alexander Pope, notably, felt the need to explain and justify his use of elemental spirits in The Rape of the Lock, one of the few English poems of the century that invoked the supernatural.

== Psychology ==
American psychological critic Norman N. Holland provided a neuroscientific theory of suspension of disbelief. Neurally, when a person engages with a narrative in a work of fiction, the brain goes wholly into a perceiving mode, engaging less intensely with the faculties for acting or planning to act; "poetic faith" is a willing act that is supported by the value of a narrative that is being engaged with. When the person stops perceiving to think about what has been seen or heard, its "truth-value" is assessed.

== Criticisms ==
Aesthetic philosophers generally reject claims that a "suspension of disbelief" can accurately characterize the relationship between people and "fictions". American philosopher Kendall Walton noted that if viewers were to truly suspend disbelief when viewing a horror movie and accept its images as absolute fact, they would have a true-to-life set of reactions that are impractical and contradict the safety of the leisure of viewing the movie. For instance, if this logic generally applied, then audience members would try to help endangered on-screen characters, or call authorities when witnessing on-screen murders.

Not all authors believe that "suspension of disbelief" adequately characterizes the audience's relationship to imaginative works of art. J. R. R. Tolkien challenged this concept in "On Fairy-Stories", choosing instead the paradigm of secondary belief based on inner consistency of reality: in order for the narrative to work, the reader must believe that what they read is true within the secondary reality of the fictional world. By focusing on creating an internally consistent fictional world, the author makes secondary belief possible. Tolkien argued that suspension of disbelief is only necessary when the work has failed to create secondary belief, saying that from that point on, the reader ceases to be immersed in the story and so must make a conscious effort to suspend their disbelief or else give up on it entirely.

== See also ==
- Aesthetic distance
- Compartmentalization (psychology)
- Deus ex machina
- Distancing effect
- Fourth wall
- Kayfabe
- Paradox of fiction
- The Real
- Sense of wonder
- Soap opera effect
- Suspension of judgment
- Tommy Westphall universe hypothesis
- Verisimilitude (fiction)
