= The Sense of an Ending =

2011 novel by Julian Barnes

- Author: Julian Barnes
- Cover artist: Suzanne Dean
- Language: English
- Publisher: Jonathan Cape (UK); Knopf (US)
- Publication date: 2011
- Publication place: United Kingdom
- English publication date: 4 August 2011
- Media type: Print (hardcover)
- Pages: 163
- ISBN: 978-0-224-09415-3

The Sense of an Ending is a 2011 novel written by British author Julian Barnes. The book is Barnes's eleventh novel written under his own name (he has also written crime fiction under the pseudonym Dan Kavanagh) and was released on 4 August 2011 in the United Kingdom. The Sense of an Ending is narrated by a retired man named Tony Webster, who recalls how he and his clique met Adrian Finn at school and vowed to remain friends for life. When the past catches up with Tony, he reflects on the paths he and his friends have taken. In October 2011, The Sense of an Ending was awarded the Booker Prize. The following month it was nominated in the novels category at the Costa Book Awards.

== Publication and marketing ==
The Sense of an Ending is Barnes's eleventh novel and was released in hardback on 4 August 2011. The Sense of an Ending is published by Random House (as a Jonathan Cape publication) in the United Kingdom. The book was released in October 2011 in the United States, after its previously scheduled publication date for the United States was brought forward by three months by Random House's Knopf publishing group to capitalise on the shortlisting of the book as a candidate for the Booker prize. Suzanne Dean designed the cover for The Sense of an Ending. The cover shows floating dandelion seeds, with its edge and the edges of all the pages blackened.

== Title ==
The title is shared by a book of the same name by Frank Kermode first published in 1967, subtitled Studies in the Theory of Fiction, the stated aim of which is "making sense of the ways we try to make sense of our lives". Kermode's book is a well-received piece of literary criticism. Critic Colin Burrow called it one of "the three most inspiring works of literary criticism written in the twentieth century", comparing Kermode's work with Erich Auerbach's Mimesis and E. R. Curtius's European Literature and the Latin Middle Ages.

Barnes has stated his choice of title was coincidental with that of Kermode, of whose book he had not previously heard, and which he has never read. He came up with the title before one of his friends pointed out that it had been used already, but decided "there's no copyright in titles". Notwithstanding which, several reviewers described the novel as being "in conversation" with Kermode. For example, the critic Boyd Tonkin adds the additional interpretation that Barnes's "show-off" characters could be typical readers of Kermode's work.

== Structure and synopsis ==
The novel is divided into two parts, entitled "One" and "Two", both of which are narrated by Tony Webster when he is retired and living alone. The first part begins in the 1960s with four intellectually arrogant school friends, of whom two feature in the remainder of the story: Tony, the narrator, and Adrian, the most precociously intelligent of the four. Towards the end of their school days another boy at the school hangs himself, apparently after getting a girl pregnant. The four friends discuss the philosophical difficulty of knowing exactly what happened. Adrian goes to Cambridge University and Tony to Bristol University. Tony acquires a girlfriend, Veronica, at whose family home he spends an awkward weekend. On waking one morning he finds that he and Veronica's mother, Sarah, are alone in the house, and she apologises for her family's behaviour towards him. Tony's and Veronica's relationship fails, with some acrimony, as he breaks up with her and has sex with her after breaking up. In his final year at university Tony receives a letter from Adrian informing him that he is going out with Veronica. Tony replies to the letter, telling Adrian that in his opinion Veronica was damaged in some way and that he should talk to her mother about it. Some months later he is told that Adrian has taken his own life, leaving a note addressed to the coroner saying that the free person has a philosophical duty to examine the nature of their life and may then choose to renounce it. Tony admires the reasoning. He briefly recounts the following uneventful forty years of his life until his sixties.

At this point Tony's narration of the second part of the novel – which is twice as long as the first – begins, with the arrival of a lawyer's letter informing him that Veronica's mother has bequeathed him £500 (which Veronica mysteriously calls "blood money") and two documents. These lead him to re-establish contact with Veronica and, after a number of meetings with her, to re-evaluate the story he has narrated in the first part. On consulting the lawyers, Tony learns that Veronica has Adrian's diary, which was bequeathed to him. This leads him to send Veronica repeated emails requesting the diary. Veronica eventually sends Tony a single page of the diary, containing Adrian's musings on life as a series of cumulative wagers. Following this, Veronica arranges to meet Tony on the "Wobbly Bridge", the Millennium Bridge in London, and gives him the letter he sent to Adrian in his youth. On rereading it, Tony realises how malicious and unpleasant it was and how he has erased this from his memory. Nevertheless, he persists in attempting to retrieve the diary from Veronica, which leads to her asking him to meet at a location in North London, where she drives him to see a group of learning disabled men being taken for a walk by their careworker, one of whom she points out to him. Tony does not understand the significance of this and Veronica leaves him with no explanation. Over the course of several weeks, Tony revisits the location until he is able to relocate the man Veronica showed him in a pub. Tony greets the man saying he is a friend of Veronica's, which leads to an upset response from the man. Tony recalls the memory of Adrian from the man's facial features. He emails Veronica an apology, saying he didn't realise that she and Adrian had a son together. Veronica only responds with the reply "You don't get it, but then you never did." On revisiting the pub where he saw the man, Tony gets into a conversation with the careworker, who reveals that the man is actually the son of Veronica's mother, Sarah, making him Veronica's half-brother. The reader is left to connect the dots.

== Reception ==
=== Critical response ===
Michael Prodger of The Financial Times said the novel's inclusion on the Man Booker Prize longlist was "absolutely merited" and he praised the intricate mechanism of the novel and said Barnes's writing is "founded on precision as well as on the nuances of language." Prodger added "Its brevity, however, in no way compromises its intensity – every word has its part to play; with great but invisible skill Barnes squeezes into it not just a sense of the infinite complexity of the human heart but the damage the wrong permutations can cause when combined. It is perhaps his greatest achievement that, in his hands, the unknowable does not mean the implausible." The Guardian's Justine Jordan said "With its patterns and repetitions, scrutinising its own workings from every possible angle, the novella becomes a highly wrought meditation on ageing, memory and regret." Boyd Tonkin from The Independent said The Sense of an Ending is "A slow burn, measured but suspenseful, this compact novel makes every slyly crafted sentence count." Anita Brookner, writing for The Daily Telegraph, said the novel is not a thriller, but a tragedy, which resembles Henry James's The Turn of the Screw. She opined that Barnes's reputation would be enhanced by the novel and added, "Do not be misled by its brevity. Its mystery is as deeply embedded as the most archaic of memories."

Entertainment Weekly's Stephen Lee gave The Sense of an Ending a B+ and said "Barnes's latest—a meditation on memory and aging—occasionally feels more like a series of wise, underline-worthy insights than a novel. But the many truths he highlights make it worthy of a careful read." Robert McCrum writing for The Observer thought the novel would win the Man Booker Prize because it is "a work of art, in a minor key." During a feature on the 2011 Man Booker Prize nominees, the Channel 4 newsroom team gave The Sense of an Ending a nine out of ten for readability and said "It's beautifully written, very readable, and raises questions which linger in the mind long after the covers are closed." Geordie Williamson from The Australian said the novel is a pleasure to read and explained there is "a fierce and unforgiving lucidity about The Sense of an Ending, a mature reckoning with ageing that makes its competitors seem petulant and shrill." Geoff Dyer in The New York Times said the novel is average at best. "It is averagely compelling ... involves an average amount of concentration and, if such a thing makes sense, is averagely well written: excellent in its averageness!" David Sexton in The Spectator drew a comparison between the narrator of the novel and the "unreliable narrator" of Ford Madox Ford's The Good Soldier, for which – he noted – Barnes wrote an introduction to the Folio Society edition. Although Sexton praised Barnes's skill, "Yet this novella does not move or satisfy ... It is a story repelled by the responsibility of having children, and its final disclosure is offputting ... where's the heart?"

=== Awards and nominations ===
In September 2011, The Sense of an Ending was shortlisted for the Booker Prize. Barnes had been shortlisted for the prize on three previous occasions for Flaubert's Parrot (1984), England, England (1998) and Arthur & George (2005). On choosing The Sense of an Ending for the shortlist, judge Gaby Wood said: "It seems to be the most obvious book on this list. It's a quiet book, but the shock that comes doesn't break stride with the tone of the rest of the book. In purely technical terms it is one of the most masterful things I've ever read." On 18 October 2011, The Sense of an Ending was awarded the Booker Prize. Head judge Stella Rimington described the novel as "exquisitely written, subtly plotted and reveals new depths with each reading." She added: "We thought it was a book that spoke to the humankind in the 21st Century."

On 15 November 2011, it was announced The Sense of an Ending had been nominated in the Best Novel category at the 2011 Costa Book Awards, though the book lost out to Andrew Miller's novel, Pure.

=== Film adaptation ===
A film adaptation of the same name made its world premiere as the opening film at the Palm Springs International Film Festival in Palm Springs, California, on 5 January 2017. The limited US release began on 10 March 2017. It was directed by Ritesh Batra from a screenplay adaptation by Nick Payne with a cast including Michelle Dockery, Emily Mortimer, Jim Broadbent, Charlotte Rampling, and Harriet Walter.
