= Dynamic logic =

Dynamic logic may mean:

- In theoretical computer science, dynamic logic (modal logic) is a modal logic for reasoning about dynamic behaviour
- In digital electronics, dynamic logic (digital electronics) is a technique used for (clocked) combinatorial circuit design
- Neural net dynamic logic (neural) investigated by Leonid Perlovsky
- In linguistics and philosophy of language, dynamic semantics is a formal framework in which meaning is understood as the ability of an utterance to update a discourse.
