= Physics of Life Reviews =

- Discipline: Biophysics
- Language: English
- Edited by: Leonid Perlovsky

Publication details
- History: 2004-present
- Publisher: Elsevier
- Frequency: Quarterly
- Impact factor: 13.7

Standard abbreviations
- ISO 4: Phys. Life Rev.

Indexing
- ISSN: 1571-0645
- LCCN: 2004209533
- OCLC no.: 56127751

Links
- Journal homepage; Online access

Physics of Life Reviews is a quarterly peer-reviewed scientific journal covering research on living systems. It was established in 2004 and is published by Elsevier. The editor-in-chief is Leonid Perlovsky. The scope of the journal includes living systems, complex phenomena in biological systems, and related fields of artificial life, robotics, mathematical biosemiotics, and artificial intelligent systems. According to the Journal Citation Reports, the journal has impact factor of 13.7.
