= The Sense of an Ending: Studies in the Theory of Fiction =

1967 book by Frank Kermode

- Author: Frank Kermode
- Language: English
- Publisher: Oxford University Press
- Publication date: 1967
- Publication place: United Kingdom
- Media type: Print
- Pages: 150

The Sense of an Ending: Studies in the Theory of Fiction is the most famous work of the English literary critic Frank Kermode. It was first published in 1967 by Oxford University Press. The titled and the essay had inspired British author, Julian Barnes to published his eleventh book, The Sense of an Ending.

The book originated in the Mary Flexner Lectures, given at Bryn Mawr College in 1965 under the title 'The Long Perspectives'.

== Summary ==
After epigraphs from William Blake and Peter Porter, Kermode begins: "It is not expected of critics as it is of poets that they should help us to make sense of our lives; they are bound only to attempt the lesser feat of making sense of the ways in which we try to make sense of our lives." This is what he then sets out to do in the book.

Kermode claims that humans are deeply uncomfortable with the idea that our lives form only a short period in the history of the world. So much has gone before us and so much will come after us. We look for a 'coherent pattern' to explain this fact, and invest in the idea that we find ourselves in the middle of a story. In order to make sense of our lives we need to find some 'consonance' between the beginning, the middle, and the end.

Humans have always used such 'fictions' to impose structure on the idea of eternity, including Homer, Augustine of Hippo and Plato. Kermode directly draws on Christian apocalyptic thought to expand his literary arguments. Christian theology posits that in the arc of history, the beginning was a golden age. The middle is the age in which we now live, and is characterised by 'decadence', where what was good has declined and is in need of 'renovation'. In order to usher in a new age, a process of painful purging (or 'terrors') needs to be undergone. People living in the middle typically believe that the end is very near, and that their own generation is the one with responsibility to usher in a new world. Kermode writes: 'It seems to be a condition attaching to the exercise of thinking about the future that one should assume one's own time to stand in extraordinary relation to it.' 'Men in the middest' are also prone to make predictions about the date on which the world will end. Indeed, some people do approach apocalyptic fictions with a 'naive acceptance'. Others have a 'clerkly scepticism' and deny that it is possible to accurately predict the world's end date.

Kermode characterises Christian theology's prevailing position towards the apocalypse as having shifted from the former 'naive acceptance' in a specific date to the latter sceptical position that the end-times may be a looser, fluid, more individual concept. This gives rise to Kermode's memorable phrase: 'No longer imminent, the End is immanent'.

Stories of the end also allow individuals to reflect on their own death, and to make sense of their lives, their place in time, and their relationship to the beginning and the end. Thus, having laid down this theoretical position, Kermode tracks the creation of new attempts to 'make sense of life' through literature. He focuses on modern literature but covers a range of authors including William Shakespeare, Edmund Spenser, William Butler Yeats, T. S. Eliot, James Joyce, the French 'new novelists', William S. Burroughs, Samuel Beckett and Jean-Paul Sartre.

In 2000 it was reissued with a new epilogue. Kermode's later work also continues similar trains of thought.

== Reception ==
On its publication, the book "caused considerable excitement among literary faculties in America". It is now considered important in the field of fiction theory.

In a 1967 review of the book, The New York Times described it as "impressively learned, eloquent and brilliant".

More recently The Daily Telegraph called it "magnificent", and Adam Phillips, in the London Review of Books, "one of the best books I had ever read".

Several obituaries of Kermode took the same title, including those that appeared in The Daily Telegraph and the journal Common Knowledge.

The book appears on numerous university reading lists and is still regularly commented upon at academic conferences and in other books on literature.

Colin Burrow wrote in 2013 that he regarded it as one of "the three most inspiring works of literary criticism written in the twentieth century" together with Erich Auerbach's Mimesis and E. R. Curtius's European Literature and the Latin Middle Ages.
