= Colin Radford =

English philosopher (1935–2001)

- Born: Colin John Radford; 27 February 1935; England
- Died: 9 April 2001 (aged 66)

Education
- Education: London School of Economics; University of Bristol; University of Oxford
- Thesis: The Synthetic A Priori (1964)
- Doctoral advisor: Gilbert Ryle

Philosophical work
- Era: Contemporary philosophy
- Region: Western philosophy
- School: Analytic philosophy
- Institutions: University of Kent
- Main interests: Aesthetics
- Notable works: "How Can We Be Moved by the Fate of Anna Karenina?" (1975)
- Notable ideas: Paradox of fiction

Colin John Radford (27 February 1935 – 9 April 2001) was an English philosopher who worked primarily in aesthetics but had interests in a wide variety of philosophical topics. He is best known for describing the paradox of fiction in the 1975 essay "How Can We Be Moved by the Fate of Anna Karenina?" and developing the paradox in a number of subsequent essays.

Radford was a pupil at Thornbury Grammar School, then studied at London School of Economics and the University of Bristol. He studied for a doctorate under Gilbert Ryle at the University of Oxford before taking a position at the University of Kent, where he taught until his retirement in 1992. He was a visiting lecturer at the University of California, Berkeley, the University of Illinois, and Queensland University.
