= Jerrold Levinson =

American philosopher

- Born: July 11, 1948 (age 78); New York City, U.S.
- Awards: International Prize of the Società Italiana d'Estetica

Education
- Education: Massachusetts Institute of Technology (BS); University of Michigan (PhD)
- Thesis: Properties, Qualities, and Categoriality (1974)
- Doctoral advisor: Kendall Walton and Jaegwon Kim

Philosophical work
- Era: Contemporary philosophy
- Region: Western philosophy
- School: Analytic
- Institutions: University of Maryland, College Park
- Main interests: Philosophy of art
- Notable ideas: The irreducible historicality of the concept of art

Jerrold Levinson (born 11 July 1948) is an American philosopher who is emeritus professor of philosophy at the University of Maryland, College Park. He is particularly noted for his work on defining art, the aesthetics of music, ontology of art, philosophy of film, interpretation, aesthetics experience, and humour.

== Education and career ==
Levinson started his studies in 1965 at the Massachusetts Institute of Technology, where he gained a B.S. degree in Philosophy and Chemistry in 1969. He earned his Ph.D. in philosophy at the University of Michigan in 1974, under the supervision of Jaegwon Kim and Kendall Walton, his dissertation covering the topic of "Properties, Qualities, and Categoriality".

During 1974–1975, he was visiting assistant professor at SUNY Albany. In 1976, he became assistant professor at the University of Maryland, was promoted to associate professor in 1982, and full professor in 1991. In 2004, he was accorded the title of distinguished university professor. He became professor emeritus in 2018. He has also been visiting professor at other US institutes, including the Johns Hopkins University and Columbia University. He has also held visiting appointments in other countries, such as England (University of London and University of Kent), New Zealand (University of Canterbury), France (Université de Rennes), Belgium (Université Libre de Bruxelles), Portugal (Universidade de Lisboa) and Switzerland (Conservatorio della Svizzera Italiana). During 2010-2011 he held an International Francqui Chair at the Katholieke Universiteit Leuven (Belgium), and in 2011 received the Premio Internazionale of the Società Italiana d'Estetica.

In 2003, Levinson co-directed a National Endowment for the Humanities Summer Institute, Art, Mind, and Cognitive Science, and during 2001-2003 was President of the American Society for Aesthetics.

== Philosophical work ==
Levinson advocates the position that music has the same relation to thought as does language; i.e., if language is an expression of thought, so is music. This is particularly revealed in his analysis of Wittgenstein's ideas on meaning in music:

"What Wittgenstein is underscoring here about the appreciation of music is this. Music is not understood in a vacuum, as a pure structure of sounds fallen from the stars, one which we receive via some pure faculty of musical perception. Music is rather inextricably embedded in our form of life, a form of life that is, as it happens, essentially linguistic. Thus music is necessarily apprehended, at least in part, in terms of the language and linguistic practices that define us and our world."

This raises interesting points in the debate on absolute music.

== Bibliography ==
Books

- Music, Art, and Metaphysics, Ithaca: Cornell UP, 1990; 2nd edition, Oxford: Oxford UP, 2011.
- The Pleasures of Aesthetics, Ithaca: Cornell UP, 1996.
- Music in the Moment, Ithaca: Cornell UP, 1998.
- Aesthetics and Ethics, ed., Cambridge UP, 1998.
- Oxford Handbook of Aesthetics, ed., Oxford UP, 2003.
- Contemplating Art, Oxford: Oxford UP, 2006.
- Musical Concerns, Oxford: Oxford UP, 2015.
- Aesthetic Pursuits, Oxford: Oxford UP, 2016.

Articles/papers

- "Properties and Related Entities", in Philosophy and Phenomenological Research, 39(1), 1978.
- "The Particularisation of Attributes", in Australasian Journal of Philosophy, 58 (2), 1980
- "What a Musical Work Is", in The Journal of Philosophy, 77(1), 1980.
- "Aesthetic Uniqueness", in The Journal of Aesthetics and Art Criticism, 38(4), 1980.
- "Autographic and Allographic Art Revisited", in Philosophical Studies, 38(4), 1980
- "Truth in Music", in The Journal of Aesthetics and Art Criticism, 40(2), 1981.
- "Gewirth on Absolute Rights", in The Philosophical Quarterly, 32(126), 1982.
- "Hybrid Art Forms", in Journal of Aesthetic Education, 18(4), 1984.
- "Titles", in The Journal of Aesthetics and Art Criticism, 44(1), 1985.
- "Evaluating Musical Performance", in Journal of Aesthetic Education, 21(1), 1987.
- "A Note on Categorical Properties and Contingent Identity", in The Journal of Philosophy, 85(12), 1988.
- "Refining Art Historically", in The Journal of Aesthetics and Art Criticism, 47(1), 1989.
- "Musical Literacy", in Journal of Aesthetic Education, 24(1) Special Issue: Cultural Literacy and Arts Education, 1990.
- "Philosophy as an Art", in Journal of Aesthetic Education, 24(2), 1990.
- "The Place of Real Emotion in Response to Fictions", in The Journal of Aesthetics and Art Criticism, 48(1), 1990.
- "Musical Profundity Misplaced", in The Journal of Aesthetics and Art Criticism, 50(1), 1992.
- "Seeing, Imaginarily, at the Movies", in The Philosophical Quarterly, 43(170), 1993.
- "Extending Art Historically", in The Journal of Aesthetics and Art Criticism, 51(3), 1993.
- "Being Realistic about Aesthetic Properties", in The Journal of Aesthetics and Art Criticism, 52(3), 1994.
- "Still Hopeful: Reply to Karl and Robinson", in The Journal of Aesthetics and Art Criticism, 53(2), 1995.
- "Critical Notice of Malcolm Budd, Values of Art", in Mind, New Series, 105(420), 1996.
- "Wollheim on Pictorial Representation", in The Journal of Aesthetics and Art Criticism, 56(3), 1998.
- "Who's Afraid of a Paraphrase?", in Theoria, 67, 2001.
- "Hume's Standard of Taste: The Real Problem", in The Journal of Aesthetics and Art Criticism, 60(3), 2002.
- "The Irreducible Historicality of the Concept of Art", in British Journal of Aesthetics 42, 2002.
- "The Real Problem Sustained: Reply to Wieand", in The Journal of Aesthetics and Art Criticism, 61(4), 2003.
- "Intrinsic Value and the Notion of a Life", in The Journal of Aesthetics and Art Criticism, 62(4), 2004.
- "Music as Narrative and Music as Drama", in Mind and Language, 19, 2004.
- "Erotic Art and Pornographic Pictures", in Philosophy and Literature, 29, 2005.
- "What Are Aesthetic Properties?", in Proceedings of the Aristotelian Society, Supplement 78, 2005.
- "Concatenationism, Architectonicism, and the Appreciation of Music", in Revue Internationale de Philosophie, 2006.
- "Why There Are No Tropes", in Philosophy, 81, 2006.
- "Musical Expressiveness as Hearability-as-Expression", in Contemporary Debates in Aesthetics, M. Kieran, ed., Blackwell, 2006.
- "Music and Philosophy", in Topoi, 28, 2009
- "The Aesthetic Appreciation of Music", in British Journal of Aesthetics, 49, 2009.
