= Melodics =

Melodics is the features of melody that are characteristic for a particular style, period, or group of composers, e.g. baroque melodics, the melodics of Frédéric Chopin's compositions. Melodics is an element of a musical work which orders the sequence of sounds of different registers and duration time.

The two basic kinds of melodics – vocal and instrumental – are combined with the main executive means. The rest derive directly from the two above and reciprocally diffuse one another.

== Kinds of melodics ==
- Vocal
  - Canticle
  - Ornamental
- Instrumental
  - Figurative

Obviously in vocal music, besides canticle melodics, figurative and ornamental ones are also encountered, but its performance requires from the singer numerous exercises as the human hearing apparatus is technically confined. What concerns instrumental music - there appear not only typical for it figurative melodics, but also canticle and ornamental melodics.

On account of the direction of the play we distinguish following kinds of melodics:

- ascending – melody elaborates to the top,
- descending – melody elaborates to the bottom,
- arched – melody ascends and descends (or inversely),
- waving – melody ascends and descends in turns many times,
- based on a continual sound (tremolo).

Beyond these we have also:

- diatonic – agitates on given sounds for a specific scale
- chromatic – implementation of chromatic signs, appear sounds that are extraneous for the scale

On account of the kind of singing we can distinguish following melodics:

- syllabic - one sound falls to one syllable
- ornamental – few sounds fall to one syllable; most often it is connected with figurative or canticle melodics
- recitative – musical recitation (melorecitation).

=== Bibliography ===
- Danuta Wójcik, Learning about music, Musica Iagellonica, Kraków, 2006 ISBN 83-7099-104-1
- Danuta Wójcik, ABC of musical form, Musica Iagellonica, Kraków, 1999 ISBN 83-7099-085-1
- Franciszek Wesołowski, Rules of music, PWM, Kraków, 2008 ISBN 978-83-224-0461-4
