= Art and emotion =

In psychology of art, the relationship between art and emotion has newly been the subject of extensive study. Emotional or aesthetic responses to art have previously been viewed as basic stimulus response, but new theories and research have suggested that these experiences are more complex and able to be studied experimentally. Emotional responses are often regarded as the keystone to experiencing art, and the creation of an emotional experience has been argued as the purpose of artistic expression. Research has shown that the neurological underpinnings of perceiving art differ from those used in standard object recognition. Instead, brain regions involved in the experience of emotion and goal setting show activation when viewing art.

== Basis for emotional responses to art ==
Evolutionary ancestry has hard-wired humans to have affective responses for certain patterns and traits. These predispositions lend themselves to responses when looking at certain visual arts as well. Identification of subject matter is the first step in understanding the visual image. Being presented with visual stimuli creates initial confusion.

Other methods of stimulating initial interest that can lead to emotion involves pattern recognition. Symmetry is often found in works of art, and the human brain unconsciously searches for symmetry for a number of reasons. Potential predators were bilaterally symmetrical, as were potential prey. Bilateral symmetry also exists in humans, and a healthy human is typically relatively symmetrical. This attraction to symmetry was therefore advantageous, as it helped humans recognize danger, food, and mates. Art containing symmetry therefore is typically approached and positively valenced to humans.

Another example is to observe paintings or photographs of bright, open landscapes that often evoke a feeling of beauty, relaxation, or happiness. This connection to pleasant emotions exists because it was advantageous to humans before today's society to be able to see far into the distance in a brightly lit vista. Similarly, visual images that are dark and/or obscure typically elicit emotions of anxiety and fear. This is because an impeded visual field is disadvantageous for a human to be able to defend itself.

=== Meta-emotions ===
The optimal visual artwork creates what Noy & Noy-Sharav call "meta-emotions". These are multiple emotions that are triggered at the same time. They posit that what people see when immediately looking at a piece of artwork are the formal, technical qualities of the work and its complexity. Works that are well-made but lacking in appropriate complexity, or works that are intricate but missing in technical skill will not produce "meta-emotions". For example, seeing a perfectly painted chair (technical quality but no complexity) or a sloppily drawn image of Christ on the cross (complex but no skill) would be unlikely to stimulate deep emotional responses. However, beautifully painted works of Christ's crucifixion are likely make people who can relate or who understand the story behind it weep.

Noy & Noy-Sharav also claim that art is the most potent form of emotional communication. They cite examples of people being able to listen to and dance to music for hours without getting tired and literature being able to take people to far away, imagined lands inside their heads. Instead of being passive recipients of actions and images, art is intended for people to challenge themselves and work through the emotions they see presented in the artistic message.

Often, people have a difficulty recognizing and explicitly expressing the emotions they are feeling. Art tends to have a way to reach people's emotions on a deeper level and when creating art, it is a way for them to release the emotions they cannot otherwise express. There is a professional denomination within psychotherapy called art therapy or creative arts therapy in which deals with diverse ways of coping with emotions and other cognitive dimensions.

== Types of elicited emotions ==
Art is a human activity, consisting in this, that one man consciously, by means of certain external signs, hands on to others feelings he has lived through, and that other people are infected by these feeling and also experience them.

— Leo Tolstoy, What Is Art? (1897)

There is debate among researchers as to what types of emotions works of art can elicit; whether these are defined emotions such as anger, confusion or happiness, or a general feeling of aesthetic appreciation. The aesthetic experience seems to be determined by liking or disliking a work of art, placed along a continuum of pleasure–displeasure. However, other diverse emotions can still be felt in response to art, which can be sorted into three categories: Knowledge Emotions, Hostile Emotions, and Self-Conscious Emotions.

=== Liking and comprehensibility ===
Pleasure elicited by works of art can also have multiple sources. A number of theories suggest that enjoyment of a work of art is dependent on its comprehensibility or ability to be understood easily. Therefore, when more information about a work of art is provided, such as a title, description, or artist's statement, researchers predict that viewers will understand the piece better, and demonstrate greater liking for it. Experimental evidence shows that the presence of a title increases perceived understanding, regardless of whether that title is elaborate or descriptive. Elaborate titles did affect aesthetic responses to the work, suggesting viewers were not creating alternative explanations for the works if an explaining title is given. Descriptive or random titles do not show any of these effects.

Furthering the thought that pleasure in art derives from its comprehensibility and processing fluency, some authors have described this experience as an emotion. The emotional feeling of beauty, or an aesthetic experience, does not have a valence emotional undercurrent. Rather it is general cognitive arousal due to the fluent processing of a novel stimuli. Some authors believe that aesthetic emotions is enough of a unique and verifiable experience that it should be included in general theories of emotion.

Art is the emotional expression of human personality.

— Eugène Véron, L'Esthetique (1882)

=== Knowledge emotions ===
Knowledge emotions deal with reactions to thinking and feeling, such as interest, confusion, awe, and surprise. They often stem from self-analysis of what the viewer knows, expects, and perceives. This set of emotions also spur actions that motivate further learning and thinking.

Emotions are momentary states and differ in intensity depending on the person. Each emotion elicits a different response. Surprise completely wipes the brain and body of any other thoughts or functions because everything is focused on the possibility of danger. Interest ties in with curiosity and humans are a curious species. Interest spikes learning and exploration. Confusion goes hand in hand with interest, because when learning something new, it can often be hard to understand, especially if unfamiliar. However, confusion also promotes learning and thinking. Awe is a state of wonder, and it is the deepest of the knowledge emotions as well as very uncommon.

==== Interest ====
Interest in a work of art arises from perceiving the work as new, complex, and unfamiliar, as well as understandable. This dimension is studied most often by aesthetics researchers, and can be equated with aesthetic pleasure or an aesthetic experience. This stage of art experience usually occurs as the viewer understands the artwork they are viewing, and the art fits into their knowledge and expectations while providing a new experience.

==== Confusion ====
Confusion can be viewed as an opposite to interest, and serves as a signal to the self to inform the viewer that they cannot comprehend what they are looking at, and confusion often necessitates a shift in action to remedy the lack of understanding. Confusion is thought to stem from uncertainty, and a lack of one's expectations and knowledge being met by a work of art. Confusion is most often experienced by art novices, and therefore must often be dealt with by those in arts education.

==== Surprise ====
Surprise functions as a disruption of current action to alert a viewer to a significant event. The emotion is centered around the experience of something new and unexpected, and can be elicit by sensory incongruity. Art can elicit surprise when expectations about the work are not met, but the work changes those expectations in an understandable way.

=== Hostile emotions ===
Hostile emotions toward art are often very visible in the form of anger or frustration, and can result in censorship, but are less easily described by a continuum of aesthetic pleasure-displeasure. These reactions center around the hostility triad: anger, disgust, and contempt. These emotions often motivate aggression, self-assertion, and violence, and arise from perception of the artist's deliberate trespass onto the expectations of the viewer.

=== Self-conscious emotions ===
Self-conscious emotions are responses that reflect upon the self and one's actions, such as pride, guilt, shame, regret and embarrassment. These are much more complex emotions, and involve assessing events as agreeing with one's self-perception or not, and adjusting one's behavior accordingly. There are numerous instances of artists expressing self-conscious emotions in response to their art, and self-conscious emotions can also be felt collectively.

==== Sublime feelings ====
Researchers have investigated the experience of the sublime, viewed as similar to aesthetic appreciation, which causes general psychological arousal. The sublime feeling has been connected to a feeling of happiness in response to art, but may be more related to an experience of fear. Researchers have shown that feelings of fear induced before looking at artwork results in more sublime feelings in response to those works.

==== Aesthetic chills ====
Another common emotional response is that of chills when viewing a work of art. The feeling is predicted to be related to similar aesthetic experiences such as awe, feeling touched, or absorption. Personality traits along the Big 5 Inventory have been shown to be predictors of a person's experience of aesthetic chills, especially a high rating on Openness to Experience. Experience with the arts also predicts someone's experience of aesthetic chills, but this may be due to them experiencing art more frequently.

=== Effects of expertise ===
The fact that art is analyzed and experienced differently by those with artistic training and expertise than those who are artistically naive has been shown numerous times. Researchers have tried to understand how experts interact with art so differently from the art naive, as experts tend to like more abstract compositions, and show a greater liking for both modern and classical types of art. Experts also exhibit more arousal when looking at modern and abstract works, while non-experts show more arousal to classical works.

Other researchers predicted that experts find more complex art interesting because they have changed their appraisals of art to create more interest, or are possibly making completely different types of appraisals than novices. Experts described works rated high in complexity as easier to understand and more interesting than did novices, possibly as experts tend to use more idiosyncratic criteria when judging artworks. However, experts seem to use the same appraisals of emotions that novices do, but these appraisals are at a higher level, because a wider range of art is comprehensible to experts.

==== Expertise and museum visits ====
Due to most art being in museums and galleries, most people have to make deliberate choices to interact with art. Researchers are interested in what types of experiences and emotions people are looking for when going to experience art in a museum. Most people respond that they visit museums to experience 'the pleasure of art' or 'the desire for cultural learning', but when broken down, visitors of museums of classical art are more motivated to see famous works and learn more about them. Visitors in contemporary art museums were more motivated by a more emotional connection to the art, and went more for the pleasure than a learning experience. Predictors of who would prefer to go to which type of museum lay in education level, art fluency, and socio-economic status.

== Theories and models of elicited emotions ==
Researchers have offered a number of theories to describe emotional responses to art, often aligning with the various theories of the basis of emotions. Authors have argued that the emotional experience is created explicitly by the artist and mimicked in the viewer, or that the emotional experience of art is a by-product of the analysis of that work.

=== Appraisal theory ===
The appraisal theory of emotions centers on the assumption that it is the evaluation of events, and not the events themselves, that cause emotional experiences. Emotions are then created by different groups of appraisal structures that events are analyzed through. When applied to art, appraisal theories argue that various artistic structures, such as complexity, prototypically, and understanding are used as appraisal structures, and works that show more typical art principles will create a stronger aesthetic experience . Appraisal theories suggest that art is experienced as interesting after being analyzed through a novelty check and coping-potential check, which analyze the art's newness of experience for the viewer, and the viewer's ability to understand the new experience. Experimental evidence suggests that art is preferred when the viewer finds it easier to understand, and that interest in a work is predictable with knowledge of the viewer's ability to process complex visual works, which supports the appraisal theory. People with higher levels of artistic expertise and knowledge often prefer more complex works of art. Under appraisal theory, experts have a different emotional experience to art due to a preference for more complex works that they can understand better than a naive viewer.

==== Appraisal and negative emotions ====
A newer take on this theory focuses on the consequences of the emotions elicited from art, both positive and negative. The original theory argues that positive emotions are the result of a biobehavioral reward system, where a person feels a positive emotion when they have completed a personal goal. These emotional rewards create actions by motivating approach or withdrawal from a stimuli, depending if the object is positive or negative to the person. However, these theories have not often focused on negative emotions, especially negative emotional experiences from art. These emotions are central to experimental aesthetics research in order to understand why people have negative, rejecting, condemning, or censoring reactions to works of art. By showing research participants controversial photographs, rating their feelings of anger, and measuring their subsequent actions, researchers found that the participants that felt hostile toward the photographs displayed more rejection of the works. This suggests that negative emotions towards a work of art can create a negative action toward it, and suggests the need for further research on negative reactions towards art.

=== Minimal model ===
Other psychologists believe that emotions are of minimal functionality, and are used to move a person towards incentives and away from threats. Therefore, positive emotions are felt upon the attainment of a goal, and negative emotions when a goal has failed to be achieved. The basic states of pleasure or pain can be adapted to aesthetic experiences by a disinterested buffer, where the experience is not explicitly related to the goal-reaching of the person, but a similar experience can be analyzed from a disinterested distance. These emotions are disinterested because the work of art or artist's goals are not affecting the person's well-being, but the viewer can feel whether or not those goals were achieved from a third-party distance.

=== Five-step aesthetic experience ===
Other theorists have focused their models on the disrupting and unique experience that comes from the interacting with a powerful work of art. An early model focused on a two-part experience: facile recognition and meta-cognitive perception, or the experience of the work of art and the mind's analysis of that experience. A further cognitive model strengthens this idea into a five-part emotional experience of a work of art. As this five-part model is new, it remains only a theory, as not much empirical evidence for the model had been researched yet.

==== Part one: Pre-expectations and self-image ====
The first stage of this model focuses on the viewer's expectations of the work before seeing it, based on their previous experiences, their observational strategies, and the relation of the work to themselves. Viewers who tend to appreciate art, or know more about it will have different expectations at this stage than those who are not engaged by art.

==== Part two: Cognitive mastery and introduction of discrepancy ====
After viewing the work of art, people will make an initial judgment and classification of the work, often based on their preconceptions of the work. After initial classification, viewers attempt to understand the motive and meaning of the work, which can then inform their perception of the work, creating a cycle of changing perception and the attempt to understand it. It is at this point any discrepancies between expectations and the work, or the work and understanding arise.

==== Part three: Secondary control and escape ====
When an individual finds a discrepancy in their understanding that cannot be resolved or ignored, they move to the third stage of their interaction with a work of art. At this point, interaction with the work has switched from lower-order and unconscious processes to higher-order cognitive involvement, and tension and frustration starts to be felt. In order to maintain their self-assumptions and to resolve the work, an individual will try to change their environment in order for the issue to be resolved or ignored. This can be done by re-classifying the work and its motives, blaming the discrepancy on an external source, or attempting to escape the situation or mentally withdraw from the work.

==== Part four: Meta-cognitive reassessment ====
If viewers cannot escape or reassess the work, they are forced to reassess the self and their interactions with works of art. This experience of self-awareness through a work of art is often externally caused, rather than internally motivated, and starts a transformative process to understand the meaning of the discrepant work, and edit their own self-image.

==== Part five: Aesthetic outcome and new mastery ====
After the self-transformation and change in expectations, the viewer resets their interaction with the work, and begins the process anew with deeper self-understanding and cognitive mastery of the artwork.

== Pupillary response tests ==
In order to research emotional responses to art, researchers often rely on behavioral data. But new psychophysiological methods of measuring emotional response are beginning to be used, such as the measurement of pupillary response. Pupil responses have been predicted to indicate image pleasantness and emotional arousal, but can be confounded by luminance, and confusion between an emotion's positive or negative valence, requiring an accompanying verbal explanation of emotional state. Pupil dilatations have been found to predict emotional responses and the amount of information the brain is processing, measures important in testing emotional response elicited by artwork. Further, the existence of pupillary responses to artwork can be used as an argument that art does elicit emotional responses with physiological reactions.

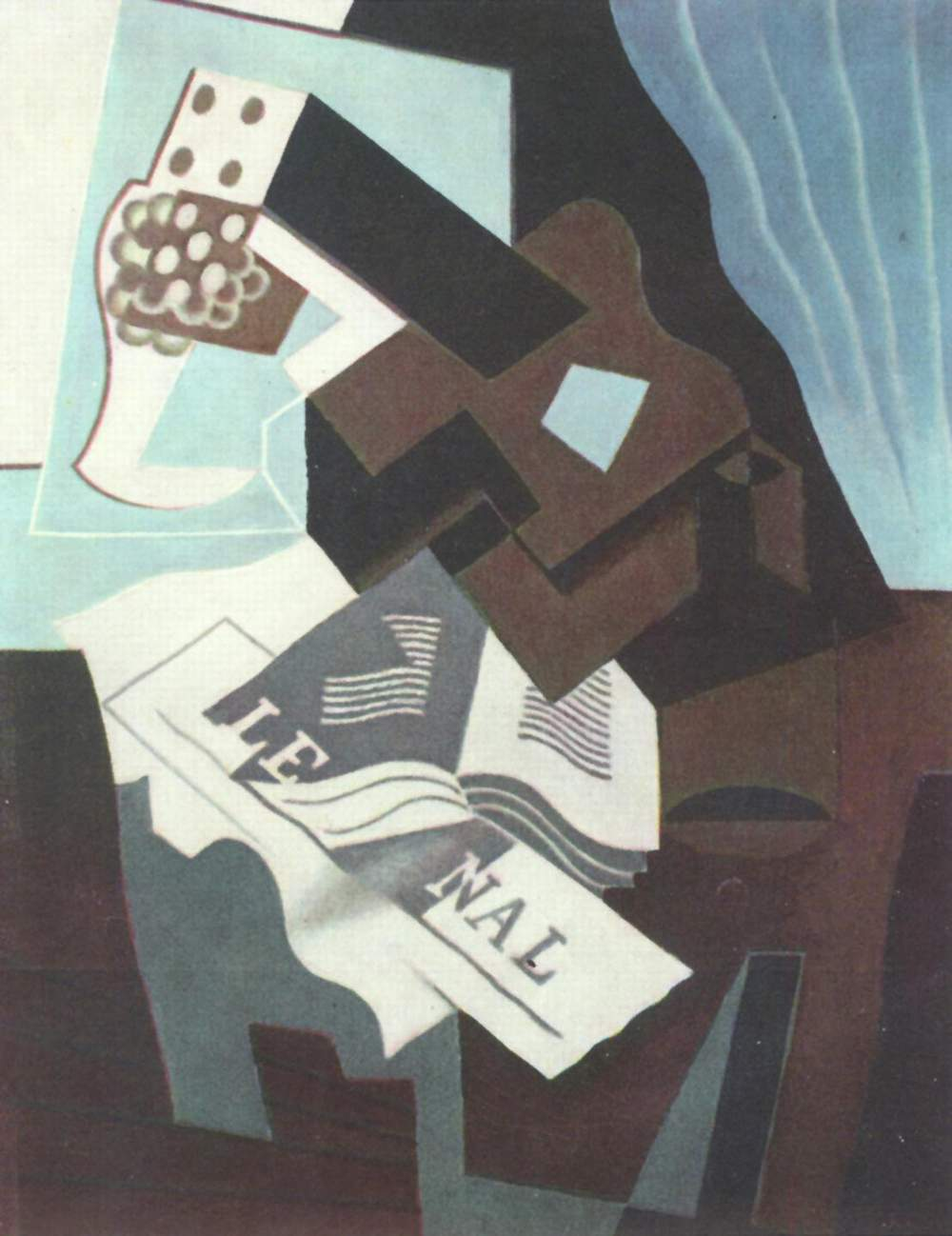
An example Cubist work by Juan Gris

=== Pupil responses to art ===
After viewing Cubist paintings of varying complexity, abstraction, and familiarity, participants' pupil responses were greatest when viewing aesthetically pleasing artwork, and highly accessible art, or art low in abstraction. Pupil responses also correlated with personal preferences of the cubist art. High pupil responses were also correlated with faster cognitive processing, supporting theories that aesthetic emotions and preferences are related to the brain's ease of processing the stimuli.

==== Left-cheek biases ====
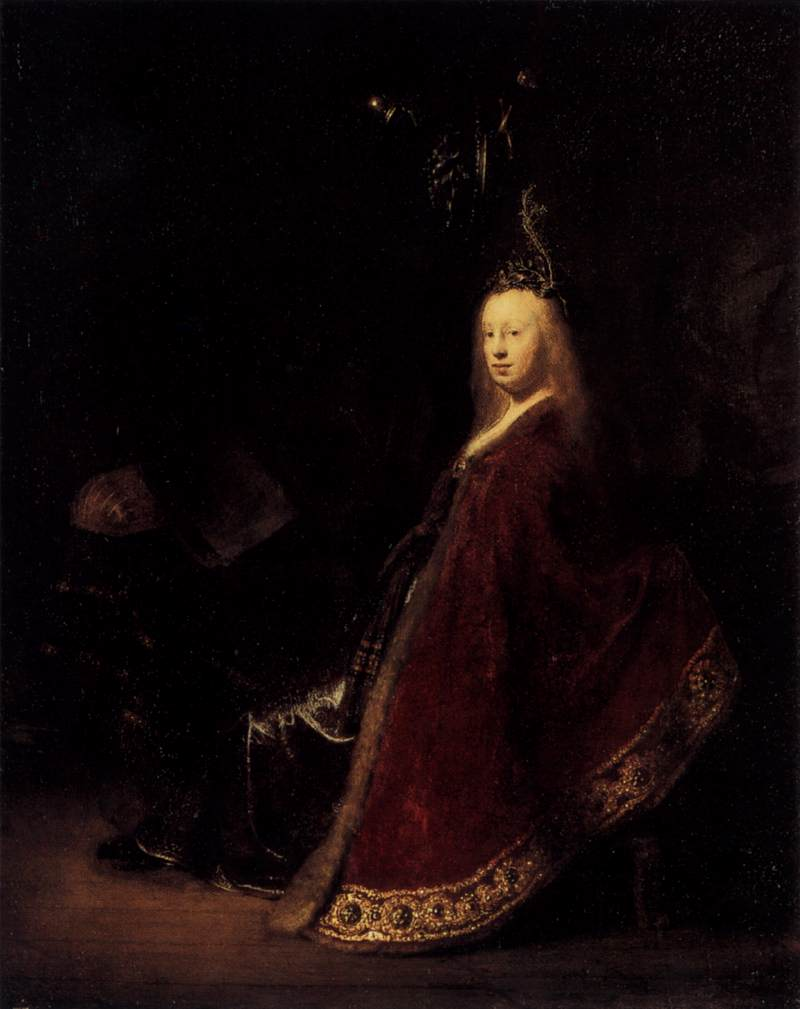
Minerva Rembrandt. Female portrait showing left-cheek orientation

These effects are also seen when investigating the Western preference for left-facing portraits. This skew towards left-cheek is found in the majority of Western portraits, and is rated as more pleasing than other portrait orientations. Theories for this preference suggest that the left side of the face as more emotionally descriptive and expressive, which lets viewers connect to this emotional content better. Pupil response tests were used to test emotional response to different types of portraits, left or right cheek, and pupil dilation was linearly related to the pleasantness of the portrait, with increased dilations for pleasant images, and constrictions for unpleasant images. Left-facing portraits were rated as more pleasant, even when mirrored to appear right-facing, suggesting that people are more attracted to more emotional facial depictions.

This research was continued, using portraits by Rembrandt featuring females with a left-cheek focus and males with a right-cheek focus. Researchers predicted Rembrandt chose to portray his subjects this way to elicit different emotional responses in his viewers related to which portrait cheek was favored. In comparison to previous studies, increased pupil size was only found for male portraits with a right-cheek preference. This may be because the portraits were viewed as domineering, and the subsequent pupil response was due to unpleasantness. As pupil dilation is more indicative of strength of emotional response than the valence, a verbal description of emotional responses should accompany further pupillary response tests.

== Art as emotional regulation ==
Art is also used as an emotional regulator, most often in Art Therapy sessions. Art therapy is a form of therapy that uses artistic activities such as painting, sculpture, sketching, and other crafts to allow people to express their emotions and find meaning in that art to find trauma and ways to experience healing. Studies have shown that creating art can serve as a method of short-term mood regulation. This type of regulation falls into two categories: venting and distraction. Artists in all fields of the arts have reported emotional venting and distraction through the creation of their art.

=== Venting ===
Venting through art is the process of using art to attend to and discharge negative emotions. However, research has shown venting to be a less effective method of emotional regulation. Research participants asked to draw either an image related to a sad movie they just watched, or a neutral house, demonstrated less negative mood after the neutral drawing. Venting drawings did improve negative mood more than no drawing activity. Other research suggests that this is because analyzing negative emotions can have a helpful effect, but immersing in negative emotions can have a deleterious effect.

=== Distraction ===
Distraction is the process of creating art in response to or despite negative emotions. This can also take the form of fantasizing, or creating an opposing positive to counteract a negative affect. Research has demonstrated that distractive art-making activities improve mood more than venting activities. Distractive drawings were shown to decrease negative emotions more than venting drawings or no drawing task, even after participants were asked to recall their saddest personal memories. These participants also experienced an increase in positive affect after a distractive drawing task. The change in mood valence after a distractive drawing task is even greater when participants are asked to create happy drawings to counter their negative mood.

== See also ==
- Aesthetic emotions
- Emotionalism
