= Aesthetic emotions =

Emotions felt during aesthetic activities

Aesthetic emotions are emotions that are felt during aesthetic activity or appreciation. These emotions may be of the everyday variety (such as fear, wonder, humor or sympathy) or may be specific to aesthetic contexts. Examples of the latter include the sublime, the beautiful, and the kitsch. In each of these respects, the emotion usually constitutes only a part of the overall aesthetic experience, but may play a more or less definitive function for that state.

== Types ==
=== Visual arts and film ===
The relation between aesthetic emotions and other emotions is traditionally said to rely on the disinterestedness of the aesthetic experience (see Kant especially). Aesthetic emotions do not motivate practical behaviours in the way that other emotions do (such as how fear motivates avoidance behaviours).

The capacity of artworks to arouse emotions such as fear is a subject of philosophical and psychological research. It raises problems such as the paradox of fiction in which one responds with sometimes quite intense emotions to art, even whilst knowing that the scenario presented is fictional (see for instance the work of Kendall Walton). Another issue is the problem of imaginative resistance, which considers why we are able to imagine many far-fetched fictional truths but experience comparative difficulty imagining that different moral standards hold in a fictional world. This problem was first raised by David Hume, and was revived in current discussion by Richard Moran, Kendall Walton and Tamar Gendler (who introduced the term in its current usage in a 2000 article by the same name). Some forms of artwork seem to be dedicated to the arousal of particular emotions. For instance horror films seek to arouse feelings of fear or disgust; comedies seek to arouse amusement or happiness, tragedies seek to arouse sympathy or sadness, and melodramas try to arouse pity and empathy.

=== Music ===
In the philosophy of music, scholars have argued whether instrumental music such as symphonies are simply abstract arrangements and patterns of musical pitches ("absolute music"), or whether instrumental music depicts emotional tableaux and moods ("program music"). Despite the assertions of philosophers advocating the "absolute music" argument, the typical symphony-goer does interpret the notes and chords of the orchestra emotionally; the opening of a Romantic-era symphony, in which minor chords thunder over low bass notes, is often interpreted by layman listeners as an expression of sadness in music.

Also called "abstract music", absolute music is music that is not explicitly "about" anything, non-representational or non-objective. Absolute music has no references to stories or images or any other kind of extramusical idea. The aesthetic ideas underlying the absolute music debate relate to Kant's aesthetic disinterestedness from his Critique of Aesthetic Judgment, and has led to numerous arguments, including a war of words between Brahms and Wagner. In the 19th century, a group of early Romantics including Johann Wolfgang von Goethe and E. T. A. Hoffmann gave rise to the idea of what can be labeled as spiritual absolutism. "Formalism" is the concept of ‘music for music’s sake’ and refers only to instrumental music without words. The 19th century music critic Eduard Hanslick argued that music could be enjoyed as pure sound and form, that it needed no connotation of extra-musical elements to warrant its existence.

== See also ==
- Art and emotion
