= Frank Kermode =

British literary critic (1919–2010)

Sir Frank Kermode FBA
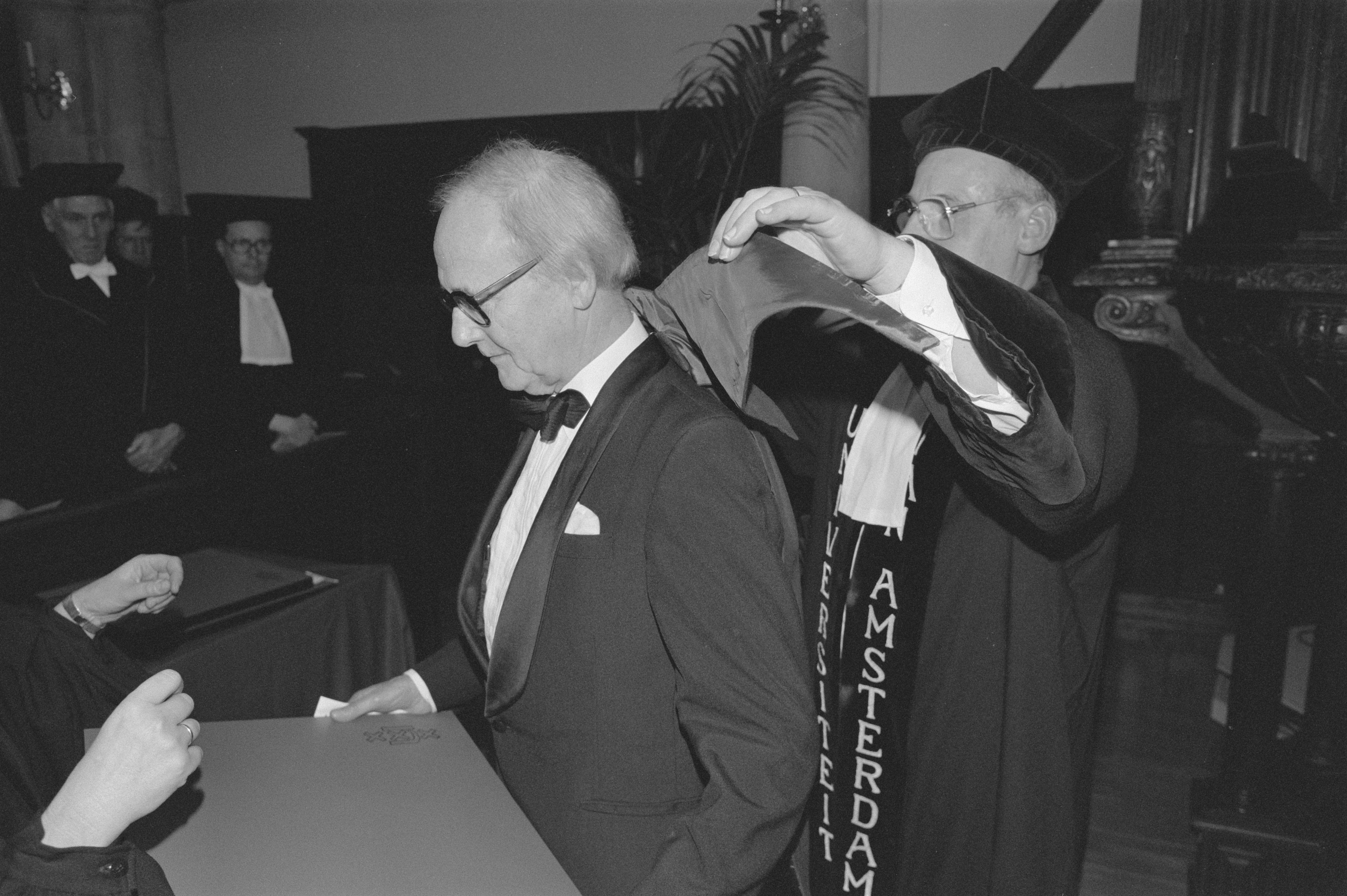
- Kermode (Amsterdam, 1988)
- Born: John Frank Kermode; 29 November 1919; Isle of Man
- Died: 17 August 2010 (aged 90); Cambridge, Cambridgeshire, England
- Title: King Edward VII Professor of English Literature (1974–1982)

Academic background
- Education: University of Liverpool

Academic work
- Discipline: Literary criticism
- Institutions: King's College, Durham University; University of Reading; University of Manchester; University of Bristol; University College London; University of Cambridge; King's College, Cambridge; Harvard University; Columbia University
- Notable works: The Sense of an Ending: Studies in the Theory of Fiction (1967)

Sir John Frank Kermode (29 November 1919 – 17 August 2010) was a British literary critic best known for his 1967 work The Sense of an Ending: Studies in the Theory of Fiction and for his extensive book-reviewing and editing.

He was the Lord Northcliffe Professor of Modern English Literature at University College London and the King Edward VII Professor of English Literature at Cambridge University.

Kermode was known for many works of criticism, and also as editor of the popular Fontana Modern Masters series of introductions to modern thinkers. He was a regular contributor to the London Review of Books and The New York Review of Books.

== Early life and education ==
Kermode was born on the Isle of Man, the only son and elder child of John Pritchard Kermode (1894–1966) and Doris Pearl (1893–1967), née Kennedy, and grew up in Douglas. His father was a delivery truck driver and warehouseman for a ferry company, and his mother, a "farm girl", had been a waitress. The family was of "extremely modest means", and "struggled to maintain a respectable yet always precarious standard of life". The Kermode family—which according to Kermode's reminiscences had "some kind of Welsh connection"—had in previous generations been somewhat more comfortable financially; Kermode's grandfather was an organist, and his grandmother, who remarried as a widow, came to own an off-licence/ general store. Her new husband "staged a robbery of the shop and stole the stock and... she went bankrupt". Kermode's father, on returning from serving in the First World War, finding there now to be no family business, "took temporary jobs and then got what he thought was a job that would see him through, as a storekeeper and he stayed in that for the rest of his career". Kermode's father retired after the Second World War, both he and his wife coming to be in poor health; Kermode's mother suffered from dementia, and his father was "an extreme diabetic", dying from diabetes while resident in a retirement home. Kermode, having come first in the examinations allowing attendance, was educated at Douglas High School for Boys and the University of Liverpool. He served in the Royal Navy during the Second World War, for six years in total, much of it in Iceland.

== Career ==
He began his academic career as a lecturer at King's College, Durham University, in 1947. He later taught at the University of Reading from 1949, where he produced the Arden edition of Shakespeare's The Tempest. He held professorships at the University of Manchester (1958) and the University of Bristol (1965), before being appointed to the Lord Northcliffe chair at University College London (UCL) in 1967. Under Kermode, the UCL English Department chaired a series of graduate seminars which broke new ground by introducing for the first time contemporary French critical theory to Britain.

Kermode was a contributor for several years to the literary and political magazine Encounter and in 1965 became co-editor. He resigned within two years, once it became clear that the magazine was funded by the CIA.

In 1974, Kermode took the position of King Edward VII Professor of English Literature at Cambridge University. He resigned the post in 1982, at least in part because of the acrimonious tenure debate surrounding Colin MacCabe. He then moved to Columbia University, where he was Julian Clarence Levi Professor Emeritus in the Humanities. In 1975–76 he held the Norton Lectureship at Harvard University.

== Awards and recognitions ==
He was knighted in 1991. A few months before Kermode's death, the scholar James Shapiro described him as "the best living reader of Shakespeare anywhere, hands down".

Kermode died in Cambridge on 17 August 2010.

=== Personal life ===
Kermode was married twice. He was married to Maureen Eccles from 1947 to 1970. The couple had twins. His second marriage was to the American scholar Anita Van Vactor. The couple co-edited The Oxford Book of Letters (1995).

In September 1996, boxes containing valuable books and manuscripts were removed by Cambridge City Council refuse collectors (instead of the removal company employed to move them to another house) and were destroyed. He sued CCC for £20,000; the Council denied responsibility.

== Academic positions ==
- Lecturer, University of Durham (1947–49)
- Lecturer, University of Reading (1949–58)
- John Edward Taylor Professor of English Literature, University of Manchester (1958–65)
- Winterstoke Professor of English, University of Bristol (1965–67)
- Lord Northcliffe Professor of Modern English Literature, University College London (1967–74)
- King Edward VII Professor of English Literature, University of Cambridge (1974–82)
- Fellow, King's College, Cambridge (1974–87)
- Charles Eliot Norton Professor of Poetry, Harvard University (1977–78)
- Julian Clarence Levi Professor in the Humanities, Columbia University (1982–84)
- Honorary Fellow, King's College, Cambridge (1988–2010)
- Honorary Fellow, University College London (1996–2010)

== Works ==
- English Pastoral Poetry from the Beginnings to Marvell, (1952), Life, Literature and Thought Library, Harrap, ISBN 0-393-00612-3, OCLC 230064261
- The Arden Edition of the Works of William Shakespeare: The Tempest (1954) London: Methuen, OCLC 479707500
- Seventeenth Century Songs, now first printed from a Bodleian manuscript (1956), ed. with John P. Cutts. Reading University School of Art, OCLC 185784945
- John Donne (1957), London: Longmans, Green & Co., ISBN 0-582-01086-1, OCLC 459757847
- Romantic Image (1957), Routledge & Kegan Paul, ISBN 0-00-632801-6, OCLC 459757853
- The Living Milton: essays by various hands, collected and edited by Frank Kermode (1960), Routledge & Kegan Paul, OCLC 460313451
- Wallace Stevens (1961), Evergreen pilot books, EP4, New York: Grove Press, ISBN 0-14-118154-0, OCLC 302326
- Puzzles and Epiphanies: essays and reviews 1958–1961 (1962), London: Routledge & Kegan Paul, OCLC 6516698
- Discussions of John Donne. Edited with an introduction by Frank Kermode (1962), Boston: D. C. Heath & Co., OCLC 561198453
- Spenser and the Allegorists (1962), London: Oxford University Press, OCLC 6126122
- William Shakespeare: the final plays (1963), London: Longmans, Green & Co., OCLC 59684048
- The Patience of Shakespeare (1964), New York: Harcourt, Brace & World, OCLC 10454934
- The Integrity of Yeats (1964), with Donoghue, Denis, Jeffares, Norman, Henn, T. R., and Davie, Donald (1964), Cork: Mercier Press, ISBN 0-88305-482-5, OCLC 1449245
- Spenser: selections from the minor poems and The Faerie Queene (1965), London: Oxford University Press, OCLC 671410
- On Shakespeare's Learning (1965), Manchester: Manchester University Press, OCLC 222028401
- Four Centuries of Shakespearian Criticism (1965) Rouben Mamoulian Collection (Library of Congress) (1965), Avon library, OS2, New York: Avon Books, ISBN 0-380-00058-X, OCLC 854327
- The Humanities and the Understanding of Reality (1966), with Beardsley, Monroe C., Frye, Northrop, Bingham, Barry; Thomas B. Stroup, ed. Lexington: University of Kentucky Press, OCLC 429358239
- The Sense of an Ending: Studies in the Theory of Fiction (1967; 2nd edition 2000), New York: Oxford University Press, ISBN 0-19-513612-8, OCLC 42072263
- Marvell: selected poetry (1962), New York: New American Library, ISBN 0-416-40230-5, OCLC 716175
- Continuities (1968), New York: Random House, ISBN 0-7100-6176-5, OCLC 166560
- The Poems of John Donne (1968), Cambridge: University Printing House, OCLC 601720173
- Shakespeare: King Lear: a casebook (1969), Casebook series, London: Macmillan, ISBN 978-0-333-06003-2
- The Metaphysical poets,(1969), Fawcett Pub. Co, OCLC 613406485
- On Poetry and Poets by T. S. Eliot (1969) editor
- Modern Essays (1970), London: Collins, ISBN 0-00-632439-8, OCLC 490969948
- Shakespeare, Spenser, Donne (1971), London, Routledge & Kegan Paul, ISBN 0-00-633168-8, OCLC 637793898
- The Oxford Reader: varieties of contemporary discourse (1971), ed. with Poirier, Richard. (1971), New York: Oxford University Press, ISBN 0-19-501366-2, OCLC 145191
- Lawrence (1973), London: Fontana Modern Masters, ISBN 0-670-27130-6, OCLC 628922
- The Oxford Anthology of English Literature: The Middle Ages Through the 18th Century (1973) ed. with John Hollander, two vols.
- English Renaissance Literature, Introductory Lectures (1974), with Stephen Fender and Kenneth Palmer
- The Classic: literary images of permanence and change (1975), New York, Viking Press, ISBN 0-670-22508-8, OCLC 1207405
- Selected Prose of T. S. Eliot (1975), London, Faber and Faber, OCLC 299343248
- The Genesis of Secrecy: on the interpretation of narrative (1979), Charles Eliot Norton lectures, Cambridge, Massachusetts; London: Harvard University Press, ISBN 0-674-34525-8, OCLC 441081372
- The Art of Telling: essays on fiction (1983), Cambridge, Massachusetts: Harvard University Press, ISBN 0-674-04828-8, OCLC 9283076
- Forms of Attention (1985), Chicago: University of Chicago Press, ISBN 0-226-43168-1, OCLC 11518139
- The Literary Guide to the Bible (1987), ed. with Robert Alter, London, Collins & Sons, OCLC 248461187
- History and Value (1988), Clarendon lectures and Northcliffe lectures 1987, Oxford: Clarendon Press, ISBN 0-19-812381-7, OCLC 613291093
- An Appetite for Poetry: essays in literary interpretation (1989), London: Collins, ISBN 0-00-686181-4, OCLC 20419496
- Poetry, Narrative, History (1989), Oxford: Blackwell, ISBN 0-631-17265-3, OCLC 283038643
- Andrew Marvell (1990), ed. with Keith Walker, Oxford: New York, Oxford University Press, OCLC 21335465
- The Uses of Error (1990), London: Collins, ISBN 0-674-93152-1, OCLC 246587512
- An Unmentionable Man (1994), ed. with Edward Upward, London: Enitharmon Press, OCLC 407255162
- The Oxford Book of Letters (1995), ed. with Anita Kermode, Oxford: Oxford University Press, OCLC 406986931
- Not Entitled: a memoir (1995), New York: Farrar, Straus and Giroux, ISBN 0-374-18103-9, OCLC 32544681
- Stevens: collected poetry and prose (1997), ed. with Joan Richardson, New York: Library of America, ISBN 1-883011-45-0, OCLC 470040871
- The Mind Has Mountains: a.alvarez@lxx (1999), ed. with Anthony Holden, et al, Cambridge: Los Poetry Press, OCLC 42309776
- Edward Upward: a bibliography 1920–2000 (2000), ed. with Alan Walker, London: Enitharmon Press, OCLC 49843441
- Shakespeare's Language (2000), New York: Farrar, Straus and Giroux, ISBN 0-374-22636-9, OCLC 42772306
- Pleasing Myself: from Beowulf to Philip Roth (2001), London: Allen Lane, ISBN 0-7139-9518-1, OCLC 462323235
- life.after.theory (interview) (2003), Michael Payne, John Schad, eds.London; New York: Continuum, OCLC 51567851
- Pieces of My Mind: writings 1958–2002 (2003) (American edition subtitled essays and criticism 1958–2002), London: Allen Lane, ISBN 0-7139-9673-0, OCLC 52144014
- The Age of Shakespeare (2004), London: Weidenfeld & Nicolson, ISBN 0-679-64244-7, OCLC 59277844
- Pleasure, Change, and Canon (2004), with Robert Alter, The Berkeley Tanner lectures, Oxford University Press, ISBN 978-0-19-517137-2
- The Duchess of Malfi: seven masterpieces of Jacobean drama (annotated edn; 2005), Modern Library, ISBN 978-0-679-64243-5
- Concerning E. M. Forster (2009), Farrar, Straus and Giroux, ISBN 978-0-374-29899-9
- Bury Place Papers: essays from the London Review of Books (2009), London Review of Books, ISBN 978-1-873092-04-0
