= Kendall Walton =

American philosopher (born 1939)

Kendall Lewis Walton
- Born: 1939 (age 86–87)

Philosophical work
- Era: Contemporary philosophy
- Region: Western philosophy
- School: Analytic
- Main interests: Aesthetics, ontology, philosophy of language, fictionalism
- Notable ideas: Make-believe theory of representation, pretense theory, photography as transparent

Kendall Lewis Walton (born 1939) is an American philosopher, the Emeritus Charles Stevenson Collegiate Professor of Philosophy and Professor of Art and Design at the University of Michigan.

His work mainly deals with theoretical questions about the arts and issues of philosophy of mind, metaphysics, and philosophy of language. His book Mimesis as Make Believe: On the Foundations of the Representational Arts develops a theory of make-believe and uses it to understand the nature and varieties of representation in the arts.

He has also developed an account of photography as transparent, defending the idea that we see through photographs, much as we see through telescopes or mirrors, and written extensively on pictorial representation, fiction and the emotions, the ontological status of fictional entities, the aesthetics of music, metaphor, and aesthetic value.

== Education and career ==
Walton studied as an undergraduate at the University of California, Berkeley, originally pursuing a major in music, having been a serious musician, probably headed (he thought) towards music theory. However, a philosophy course in his sophomore year convinced him to change his major, tentatively, from music to philosophy. After a few more courses, he became convinced he had found his calling, stating that he had always been “more or less hooked” on philosophy, despite not knowing it by that name.

Because of his background in music, Walton expected that he would have an interest in aesthetics and philosophy of art, but was unmoved by his contacts with these fields at Berkeley. After graduating in 1961, he pursued postgraduate studies at Cornell University where he attended a seminar with the British philosopher and aesthetician Frank Sibley that he discovered "how exciting aesthetics can be, how serious, rigorous philosophical thought can connect with real, real-world interests in the arts". He wrote his dissertation, 'Conceptual Schemes: A Study of Linguistic Relativity and Related Philosophical Problems', with Sydney Shoemaker on philosophy of language, mind and metaphysics, and graduated in 1967 with a Ph.D.

After having been invited to teach a course on aesthetics that he was not fully prepared for (having only had the one seminar with Sibley), he stayed up nearly all night brainstorming topics, which led to his paper 'Categories of Art'. Recognizing that the analytic tradition had not explored aesthetics at the time, he was drawn to the idea of being a pioneer, saying:

That is more fun, for me, than fine tuning ideas others have worked on for decades or centuries. And I don’t have to leave behind my interests in music and the other arts!

He joined the University of Michigan faculty in 1965, and became Charles L. Stevenson Collegiate Professor in 1999. He was elected as a Fellow of the American Academy of Arts and Sciences in 1998, and received an honorary doctorate from the University of Nottingham in 2005. He was president of the American Society for Aesthetics from 2003 to 2005.

== Philosophical work ==
=== Make-believe theory ===
Walton's major contribution to philosophy is his theory of representation, known as the make-believe theory. In the context of ontology, the same theory is usually referred to as pretense theory, and in the context of representational arts, prop theory. Walton has been working on this philosophical theory since 1973, and it is expounded in his 1990 magnum opus Mimesis as Make -Believe: On the Foundations of the Representational Arts. The theory is a development of Ernst Gombrich's sketched ideas concerning the relationship between toys and art, presented in his famous essay 'Meditations on a Hobby Horse', which Walton has described as having been “largely ignored” by most of philosophy of art.

According to Walton's theory, representational art can be understood as props that prescribe specific imaginings, analogous to the way children's toys such as dolls and teddy bears function as props in children's games of make-believe, albeit with greater sophistication. Via certain principles of generation, any such prop generates fictional truths, which collectively constitute fictional worlds. Walton identifies two kinds of such worlds: the game world of each participant and the work world, which can be thought of as containing only such content as is true in any well-formed game world. Props are divided into two forms: sensory depictions (such as paintings, sculpture and certain kinds of music), and verbal representations (such as novels and the spoken component of theater).

A key clarification that the make-believe theory offers is the idea that the term 'fictional' can be taken to mean “true in the appropriate game of make-believe” or, equivalently, true in the fictional world of the representation. Walton states that “Imagining aims at the fictional as belief aims at the true. What is true is to be believed; what is fictional is to be imagined.” He develops this concept into an ontology of fictional objects that eliminates any “voodoo metaphysics” by recognising that people sometimes refer to fictional entities as if they were referring to real entities. Walton identifies a pretense construal whereby a person pretends to describe the real world, when actually describing a fictional world.

The genesis of the make-believe theory can be found in Walton's 1978 paper 'Fearing Fictions', which addresses the paradox of fiction i.e. how can we be moved by things that do not exist in the case of fiction? Walton's solution is to accept that our responses to fiction are genuine emotions, but to deny that they correspond to the conventional feelings that we refer to – rather, it is fictional that they are the conventional emotions. So, for instance, when a person who has watched a horror movie declares that they felt afraid, it is true that they were emotionally moved, but fictional that what they were moved to was fear. Walton refers to these fictional emotions as quasi emotions.

In later papers, Walton has expanded his theory to recognize a distinction between content oriented make-believe, which describes a participant's relationship to the fictional worlds of novels, films, paintings etc. and prop oriented make-believe, in which the participant's interest is in the nature of the prop itself, not in the fictional world that attaches to it. Metaphors are a classic example of prop oriented make-believe: the phrase “we are in the same boat” is not intended to elicit imaginings about the fictional boat we are in, but to communicate by drawing our attention to a specific prop (the boat). Stephen Yablo has developed Walton's concept of prop oriented make-believe in connection with numbers and concluded that our understanding of cardinality is essentially based upon fiction.

=== Responses ===
The make-believe theory has been described by Jerrold Levinson as “the most significant event in Anglo-American aesthetics in many a year”, and compares it to Nelson Goodman's Languages of Art (1968), Richard Wollheim's Art and Its Objects and Arthur Danto's Transfiguration of the Commonplace by suggesting that it “joins a small pantheon of landmark books”.

Simo Säätelä compared Walton's approach with the make-believe theory to that of Gilbert Ryle in The Concept of Mind (1949), albeit far wider in scope.

Patrick Maynard has praised Walton's achievement, saying: "he has worked out a theory of representation relevant to the arts. In an age of aesthetics glib about theory, I wonder if it will be appreciated how significant an accomplishment this is."

The game designer and philosopher Chris Bateman has adapted the make-believe theory to games and videogames.

=== Later theories ===
Walton has developed several additional philosophical theories pertaining to art. He has developed the groundwork for a theory of aesthetic value in which aesthetic pleasure is understood as being partly constituted by the admiration a participant feels for an artwork, and suggested that styles in art can be understood by comparison to the adjective qualities we attach to the actions that artists apparently took in making a work of art.

Additionally, he has developed a transparency thesis of photography, which is summarized in the following claim: “Photographs are transparent. We see the world through them.” Walton recognizes that this use of 'see' may differ from its conventional usage, but considers it parallel to the way we talk about 'seeing' through a telescope or other such tool. In viewing a photograph, we thus have two related experiences: we see through the photograph to the circumstances it was originally taken, and we have a fictional experience using the photograph as a prop e.g. if one looks at a photograph of Aunt Mabel grimacing one may say “Aunt Mabel is grimacing” - it is fictional that one sees her grimacing, but in addition one actually sees through the photograph an actual grimace that she had on her face in the past.

== Books ==
- Mimesis as Make-Believe: On the Foundations of the Representational Arts. Cambridge, Mass.: Harvard University Press, 1990.
- Marvelous Images: On Values and the Arts. Oxford & New York: Oxford University Press, 2008.
- In Other Shoes: Music, Metaphor, Empathy, Existence. Oxford & New York: Oxford University Press, 2015.
