= Antony and Cleopatra =

Play by William Shakespeare

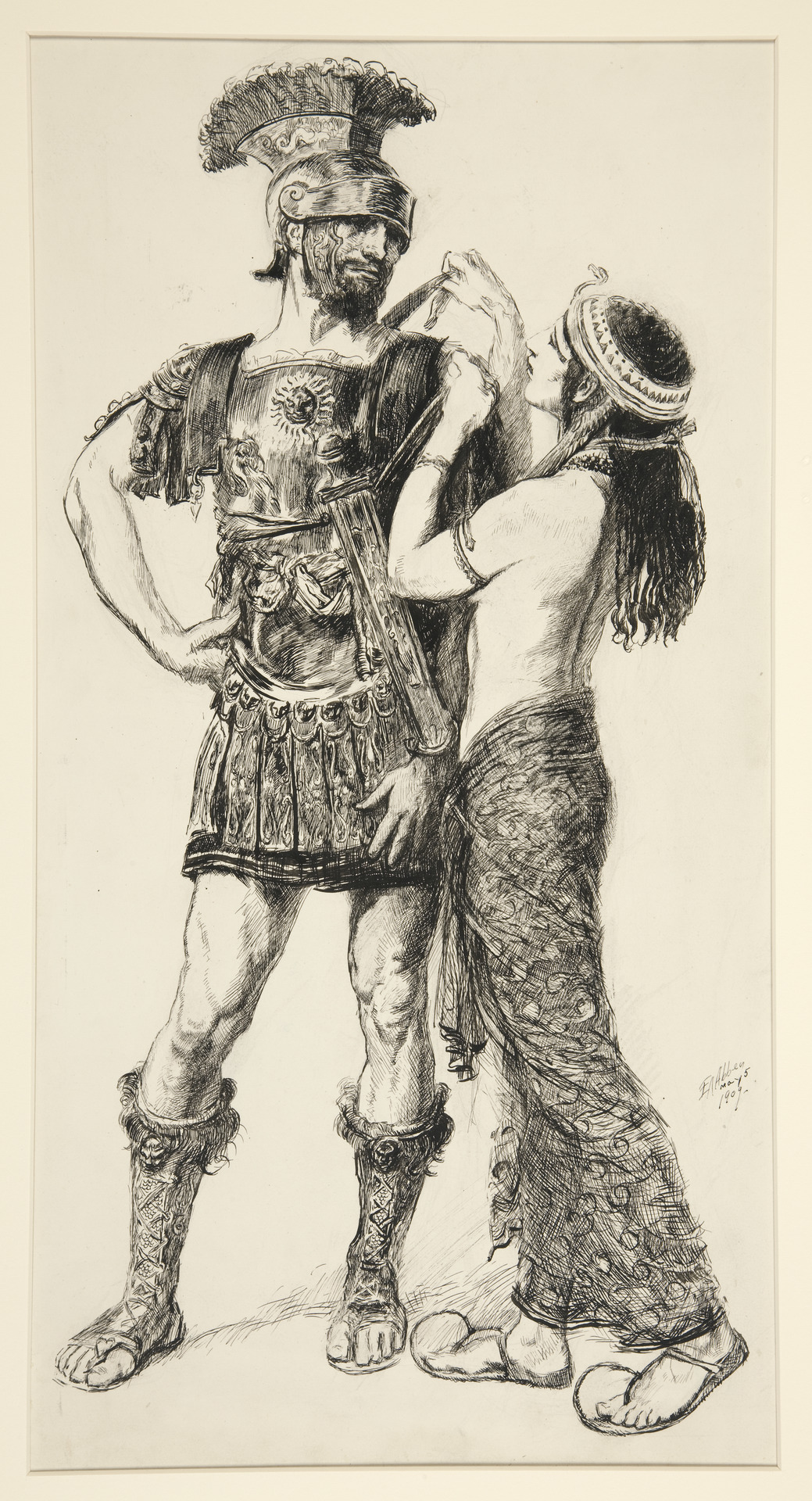
Cleopatra: "Sooth, la, I'll help: Thus it must be." Antony and Cleopatra 4.4/11 (Edwin Austin Abbey, 1909)

Antony and Cleopatra is a tragedy by William Shakespeare. The play was first performed around 1607, by the King's Men at either the Blackfriars Theatre or the Globe Theatre. Its first appearance in print was in the First Folio published in 1623, under the title The Tragedie of Anthonie, and Cleopatra.

The plot is based on Thomas North's 1579 English translation of Plutarch's Lives (in Ancient Greek) and follows the relationship between Cleopatra and Mark Antony from the time of the Sicilian revolt to Cleopatra's suicide during the War of Actium. The main antagonist is Octavius Caesar, one of Antony's fellow triumvirs of the Second Triumvirate and the first emperor of the Roman Empire. The tragedy is mainly set in the Roman Republic and Ptolemaic Egypt and is characterized by swift shifts in geographical location and linguistic register as it alternates between sensual, imaginative Alexandria and a more pragmatic, austere Rome.

Many consider Shakespeare's Cleopatra, whom Enobarbus describes as having "infinite variety", as one of the most complex and fully developed female characters in the playwright's body of work. She is frequently vain and histrionic enough to provoke an audience almost to scorn; at the same time, Shakespeare invests her and Antony with tragic grandeur. These contradictory features have led to famously divided critical responses. It is difficult to classify Antony and Cleopatra as belonging to a single genre. It can be described as a history play (though it does not completely adhere to historical accounts), as a tragedy, as a comedy, as a romance, and according to some critics, such as McCarter, a problem play. All that can be said with certainty is that it is a Roman play. It is perhaps a sequel to another of Shakespeare's tragedies, Julius Caesar.

== Characters ==
- Mark Antony – Triumvir of the Roman Republic after the assassination of Julius Caesar in 44 B.C.
- Octavius Caesar – adopted son of Julius Caesar and future Emperor Augustus; another triumvir
- Lepidus – another triumvir
- Cleopatra – Queen of Egypt
- Sextus Pompey – rebel against the triumvirate and son of the late Pompey

Antony's party

- Demetrius
- Philo
- Domitius Enobarbus
- Ventidius
- Silius – officer in Ventidius' army
- Eros
- Canidius – Antony's lieutenant-general
- Scarus
- Dercetus
- Schoolmaster – Antony's ambassador to Octavius
- Rannius (non-speaking role)
- Lucilius (non-speaking role)
- Lamprius (non-speaking role)

Octavius' party

- Octavia – Octavius' sister
- Maecenas
- Agrippa – admiral of the Roman navy
- Taurus – Octavius' lieutenant general
- Dolabella
- Thidias
- Gallus
- Proculeius

Sextus' party

- Menecrates
- Menas – one of Sextus' naval leaders
- Varrius

Cleopatra's party

- Charmian – maid of honour
- Iras – maid of honour
- Alexas
- Mardian – a eunuch
- Diomedes – treasurer
- Seleucus – attendant

Other

- Soothsayer
- Clown
- Boy
- Sentry
- Officers, Soldiers, Messengers, and other Attendants

== Synopsis ==
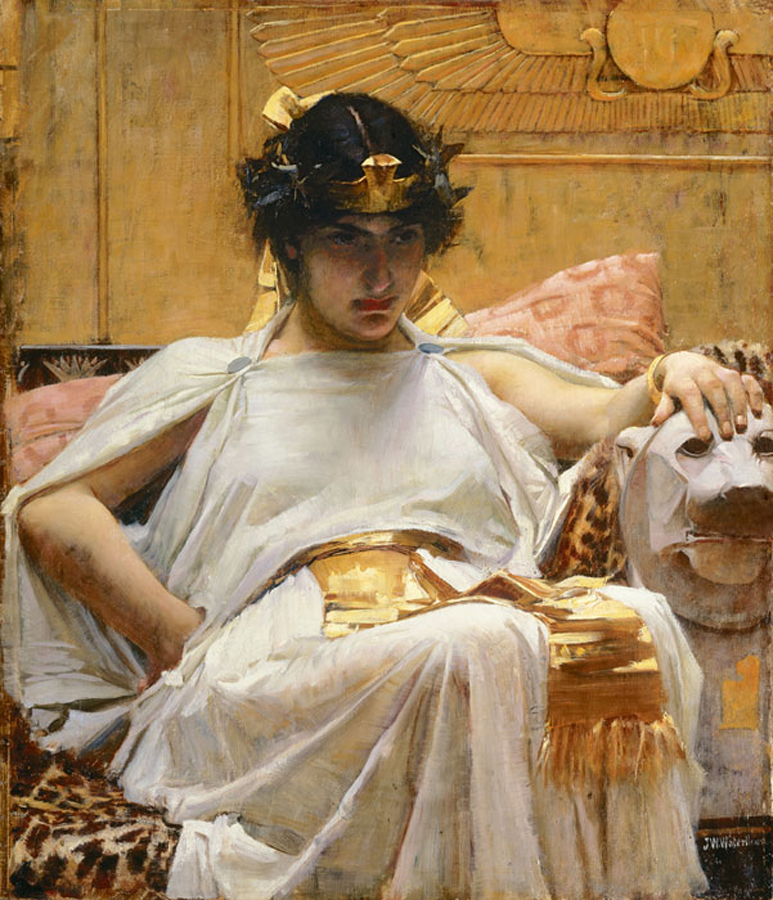
Cleopatra by John William Waterhouse (1888)

Mark Antony—one of the triumvirs of the Roman Republic, along with Octavius and Lepidus—has neglected his soldierly duties after being beguiled by Egypt's Queen, Cleopatra. He ignores Rome's domestic problems, including the fact that his third wife Fulvia rebelled against Octavius and then died.

Octavius calls Antony back to Rome from Alexandria to help him fight against Sextus Pompey, Menecrates, and Menas, three notorious pirates of the Mediterranean. At Alexandria, Cleopatra begs Antony not to go, and though he repeatedly affirms his deep passionate love for her, he eventually leaves.

The triumvirs meet in Rome, where Antony and Octavius put to rest, for now, their disagreements. Octavius' general, Agrippa, suggests that Antony should marry Octavius's sister, Octavia, in order to cement the friendly bond between the two men. Antony accepts. Antony's lieutenant Enobarbus, though, knows that Octavia can never satisfy him after Cleopatra. In a famous passage, he describes Cleopatra's charms: "Age cannot wither her, nor custom stale / Her infinite variety: other women cloy / The appetites they feed, but she makes hungry / Where most she satisfies."

A soothsayer warns Antony that he is sure to lose if he ever tries to fight Octavius.

In Egypt, Cleopatra learns of Antony's marriage to Octavia and takes furious revenge upon the messenger who brings her the news. She grows content only when her courtiers assure her that Octavia is homely: short, low-browed, round-faced and with bad hair.

Before battle, the triumvirs parley with Sextus Pompey, and offer him a truce. He can retain Sicily and Sardinia, but he must help them "rid the sea of pirates" and send them tributes. After some hesitation, Sextus agrees. They engage in a drunken celebration on Sextus' galley, though the austere Octavius leaves early and sober from the party. Menas suggests to Sextus that he kill the three triumvirs and make himself ruler of the Roman Republic, but he refuses, finding it dishonourable. After Antony departs Rome for Athens, Octavius and Lepidus break their truce with Sextus and war against him. This infuriates Antony.

Antony returns to Hellenistic Alexandria and crowns Cleopatra and himself as rulers of Egypt and the eastern third of the Roman Republic (which was Antony's share as one of the triumvirs). He accuses Octavius of not giving him his fair share of Sextus' lands, and is angry that Lepidus, whom Octavius has imprisoned, is out of the triumvirate. Octavius agrees to the former demand, but otherwise is very displeased with what Antony has done.

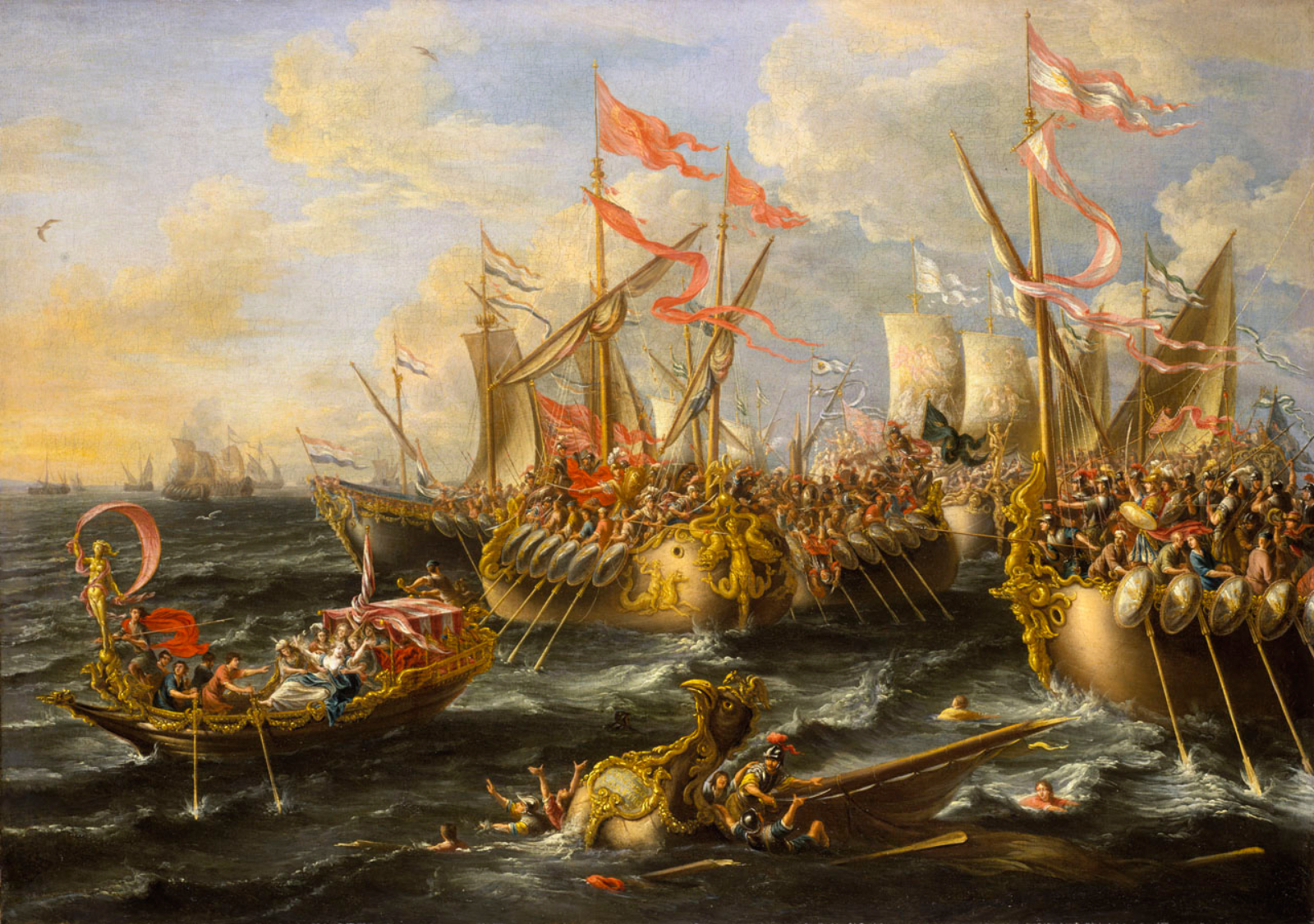
In this Baroque vision, Battle of Actium by Laureys a Castro (1672), Cleopatra flees, lower left, in a barge with a figurehead of Fortuna.

Antony prepares to battle Octavius. Enobarbus urges Antony to fight on land, where he has the advantage, instead of by sea, where the navy of Octavius is lighter, more mobile and better manned. Antony refuses, since Octavius has dared him to fight at sea. Cleopatra pledges her fleet to aid Antony. However, during the Battle of Actium off the western coast of Greece, Cleopatra flees with her sixty ships, and Antony follows her, leaving his forces to ruin. Ashamed of what he has done for the love of Cleopatra, Antony reproaches her for making him a coward, but also sets this true and deep love above all else, saying "Give me a kiss; even this repays me."

Octavius sends a messenger to ask Cleopatra to give up Antony and come over to his side. She hesitates, and flirts with the messenger, when Antony walks in and angrily denounces her behaviour. He sends the messenger to be whipped. Eventually, he forgives Cleopatra and pledges to fight another battle for her, this time on land.

On the eve of the battle, Antony's soldiers hear strange portents, which they interpret as the god Hercules abandoning his protection of Antony. Furthermore, Enobarbus, Antony's long-serving lieutenant, deserts him and goes over to Octavius' side. Rather than confiscating Enobarbus' goods, which Enobarbus did not take with him when he fled, Antony orders them to be sent to Enobarbus. Enobarbus is so overwhelmed by Antony's generosity, and so ashamed of his own disloyalty, that he dies from a broken heart.

Antony loses the battle as his troops desert en masse and he denounces Cleopatra: "This foul Egyptian hath betrayed me." He resolves to kill her for the imagined treachery. Cleopatra decides that the only way to win back Antony's love is to send him word that she killed herself, dying with his name on her lips. She locks herself in her monument, and awaits Antony's return.

Her plan backfires: rather than rushing back in remorse to see the "dead" Cleopatra, Antony decides that his own life is no longer worth living. He begs one of his aides, Eros, to run him through with a sword, but Eros cannot bear to do it and kills himself. Antony admires Eros' courage and attempts to do the same, but only succeeds in wounding himself. In great pain, he learns that Cleopatra is indeed alive. He is hoisted up to her in her monument and dies in her arms.

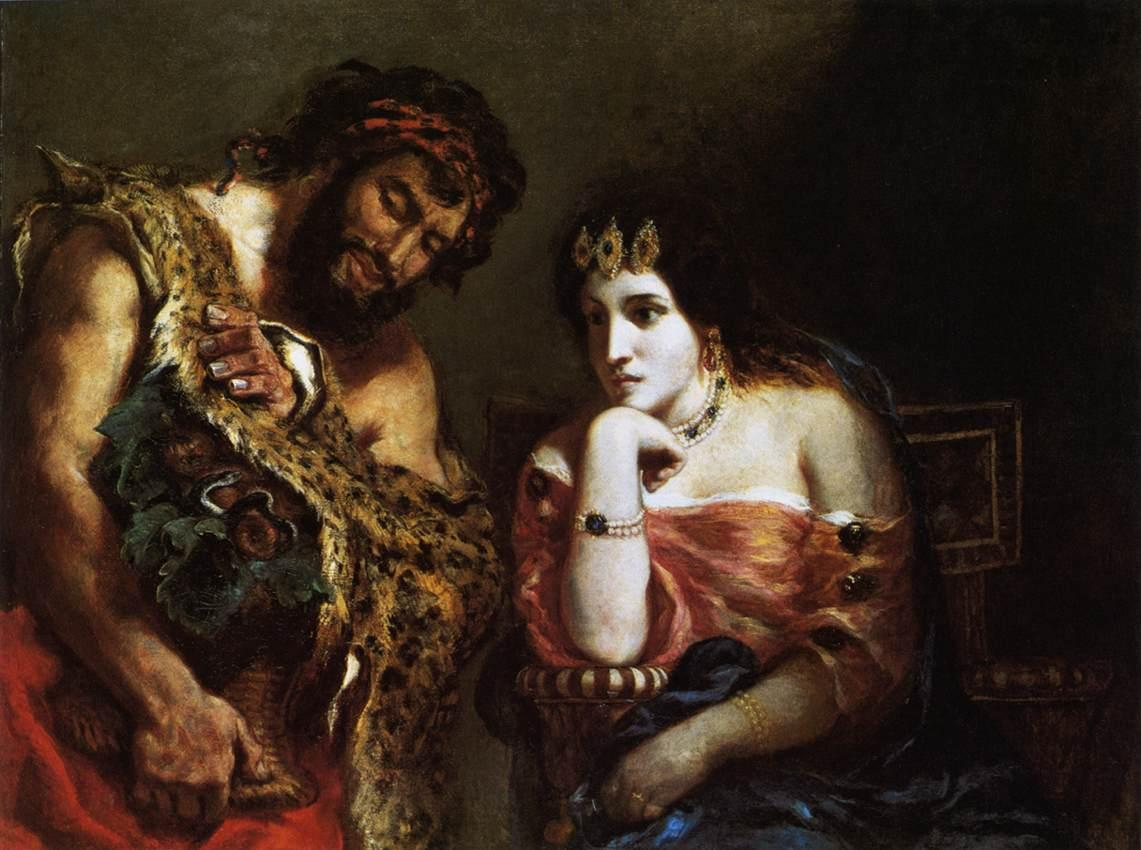
Cleopatra and the Peasant, Eugène Delacroix (1838)

Since Egypt has been defeated, the captive Cleopatra is placed under a guard of Roman soldiers. She tries to take her own life with a dagger, but Proculeius disarms her. Octavius arrives, assuring her she will be treated with honour and dignity. But Dolabella secretly warns her that Octavius intends to parade her at his Roman triumph. Cleopatra bitterly envisions the endless humiliations awaiting her for the rest of her life as a Roman conquest.

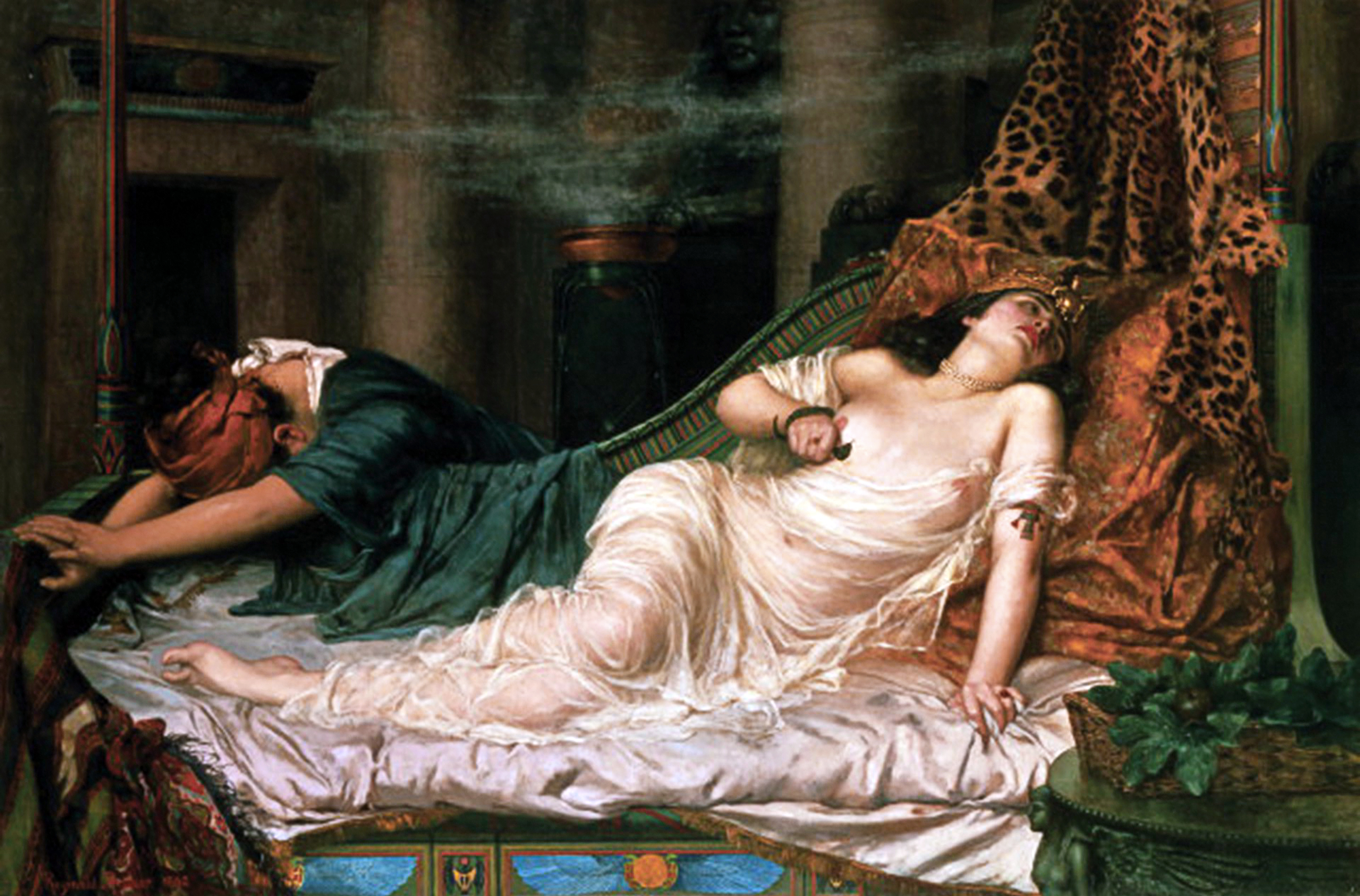
The Death of Cleopatra by Reginald Arthur (1892)

Cleopatra kills herself using the venomous bite of an asp, imagining how she will meet Antony again in the afterlife. Her serving maids Iras and Charmian also die, Iras from heartbreak and Charmian from one of the two asps in Cleopatra's basket. Octavius discovers the dead bodies and experiences conflicting emotions. Antony and Cleopatra's deaths leave him free to become the first Roman Emperor, but he also feels some sympathy for them. He orders a public military funeral.

== Sources ==
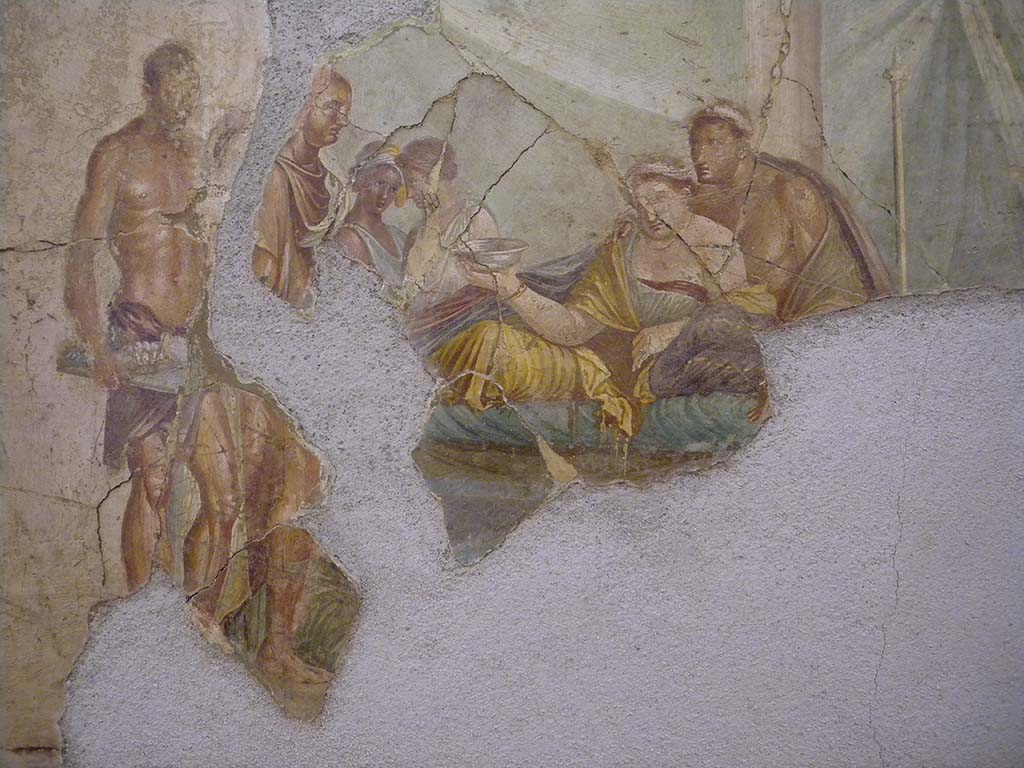
Roman painting from the House of Giuseppe II, Pompeii, early 1st century AD, most likely depicting Cleopatra VII, wearing her royal diadem, consuming poison in an act of suicide, while her son Caesarion, also wearing a royal diadem, stands behind her

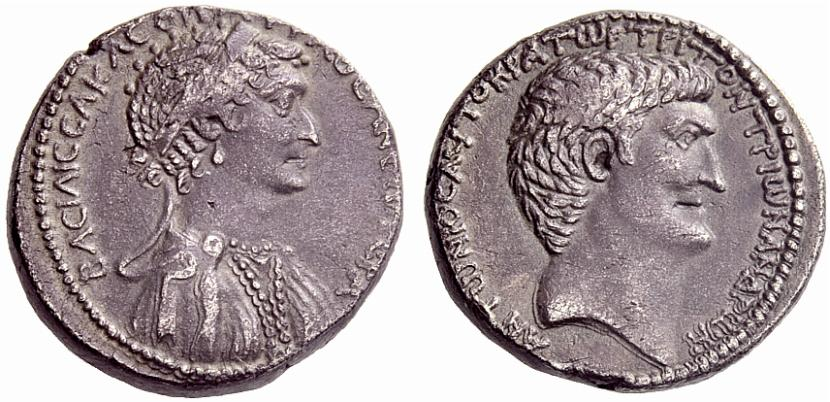
Cleopatra and Mark Antony on the obverse and reverse, respectively, of a silver tetradrachm struck at the Antioch mint in 36 BC

The principal source for the story is an English translation of a French translation of Plutarch's "Life of Mark Antony", from the Lives of the Noble Grecians and Romans Compared Together. This translation, by Sir Thomas North, was first published in 1579. Many phrases in Shakespeare's play are taken directly from North, including Enobarbus' famous description of Cleopatra and her barge:

I will tell you.
The barge she sat in, like a burnish'd throne,
Burn'd on the water: the poop was beaten gold;
Purple the sails, and so perfumed that
The winds were love-sick with them; the oars were silver,
Which to the tune of flutes kept stroke, and made
The water which they beat to follow faster,
As amorous of their strokes. For her own person,
It beggar'd all description: she did lie
In her pavilion—cloth-of-gold of tissue—
O'er-picturing that Venus where we see
The fancy outwork nature: on each side her
Stood pretty dimpled boys, like smiling Cupids,
With divers-colour'd fans, whose wind did seem
To glow the delicate cheeks which they did cool,
And what they undid did.

This may be compared with North's text:

Therefore when she was sent unto by diverse letters, both from Antonius himselfe, and also from his friends, she made so light of it and mocked Antonius so much, that she disdained so set forward otherwise, but to take her barge in the river of Cydnus, the poope whereof was of gold, the sailes of purple, and the oares of silver, which kept stroke in rowing after the sound of musicke of flutes, howboyes cithernes, vials and such other instruments as they played upon the barge. And now for the person of her selfe: she was layed under a pavilion of cloth of gold of tissue, apparelled and attired like the goddesse Venus, commonly drawn in picture: and hard by her, on either hand of her, pretie fair boys apparelled as painters do set foorth god Cupid, with little fans in their hands, with which they fanned wind upon her.

— The Life of Marcus Antonius

However, Shakespeare also adds scenes, including many portraying Cleopatra's domestic life, and the role of Enobarbus is greatly developed. Historical facts are also changed: in Plutarch, Antony's final defeat was many weeks after the Battle of Actium, and Octavia lived with Antony for several years and bore him two children: Antonia Major, paternal grandmother of the Emperor Nero and maternal grandmother of the Empress Valeria Messalina, and Antonia Minor, the sister-in-law of the Emperor Tiberius, mother of the Emperor Claudius, and paternal grandmother of the Emperor Caligula and Empress Agrippina the Younger.

== Date and text ==
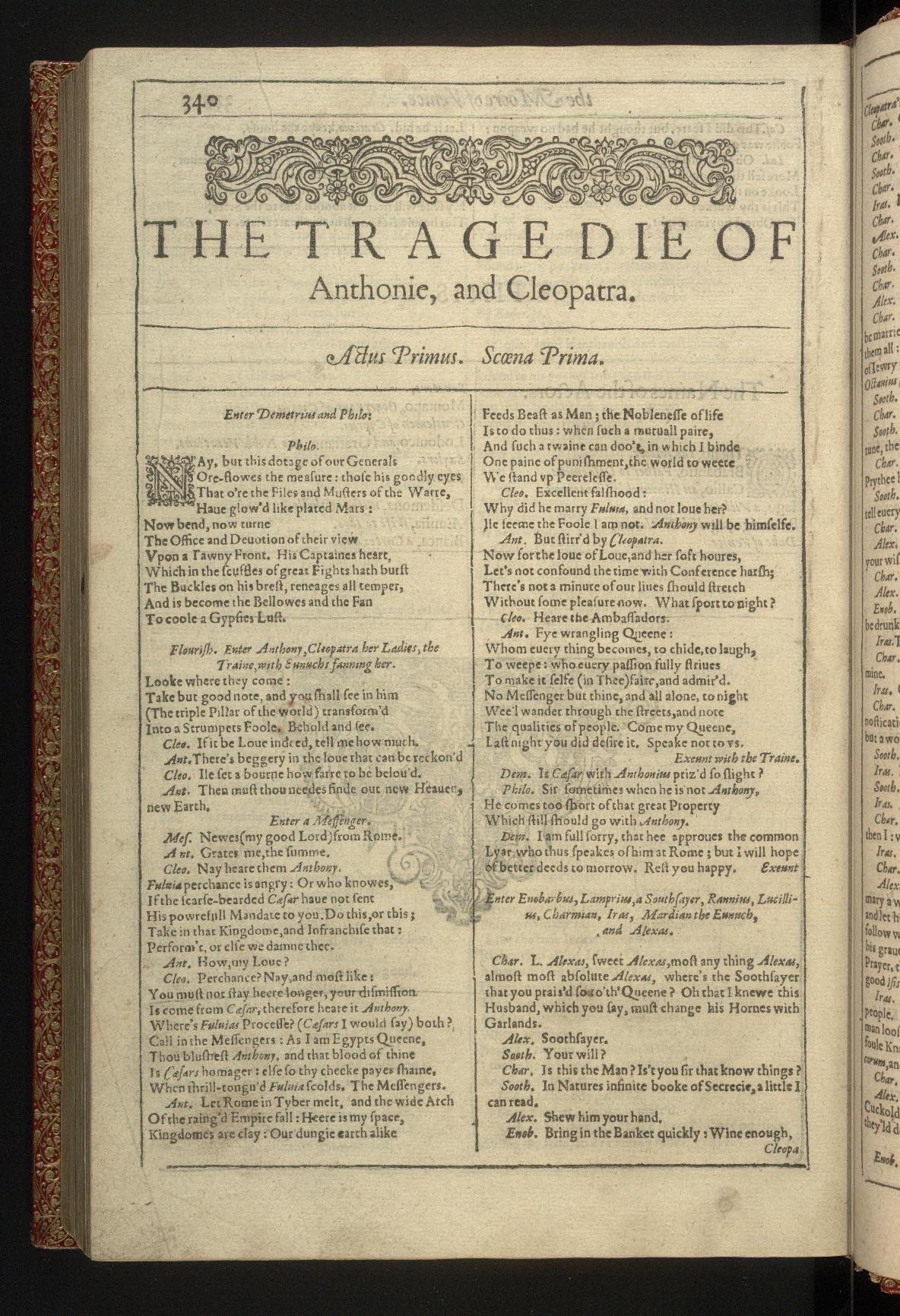
The first page of Antony and Cleopatra from the First Folio of Shakespeare's plays, published in 1623.

Many scholars believe Shakespeare's play was written in 1606–07, (Note: E. g., Wilders, Miola, Bloom, Kermode, Hunter, Braunmuller, and Kennedy.) although some researchers have argued for an earlier dating, around 1603–04. Antony and Cleopatra was entered in the Stationers' Register (an early form of copyright for printed works) in May 1608, but it does not seem to have been actually printed until the publication of the First Folio in 1623. The Folio is therefore the only authoritative text today. Some scholars speculate that it derives from Shakespeare's own draft, or "foul papers", since it contains minor errors in speech labels and stage directions that are thought to be characteristic of the author in the process of composition.

Modern editions divide the play into a conventional five-act structure but, as in most of his earlier plays, Shakespeare did not create these act divisions. His play is articulated in forty separate "scenes", more than he used for any other play. Even the word "scenes" may be inappropriate as a description, as the scene changes are often very fluid, almost montage-like. The large number of scenes is necessary because the action frequently switches between Alexandria, Italy, Messina in Sicily, Syria, Athens, and other parts of Egypt and the Roman Republic. The play contains thirty-four speaking characters, fairly typical for a Shakespeare play on such an epic scale.

== Analysis and criticism ==
=== Classical allusions and analogues: Dido and Aeneas from Virgil's Aeneid ===
Many critics have noted the strong influence of Virgil's first-century Roman epic poem, the Aeneid, on Shakespeare's Antony and Cleopatra. Such influence should be expected, given the prevalence of allusions to Virgil in the Renaissance culture in which Shakespeare was educated. The historical Antony and Cleopatra were the prototypes and antitypes for Virgil's Dido and Aeneas: Dido, ruler of the north African city of Carthage, tempts Aeneas, the legendary exemplar of Roman pietas, to forego his task of founding Rome after the fall of Troy. The fictional Aeneas dutifully resists Dido's temptation and abandons her to forge on to Italy, placing political destiny before romantic love, in stark contrast to Antony, who puts passionate love of his own Egyptian queen, Cleopatra, before duty to Rome. (Note: On the historical political context of the Aeneid and its larger influence on the Western literary tradition through the seventeenth century, see Quint, David (1993). Epic and Empire: Politics and Generic Form from Virgil to Milton. Princeton, New Jersey: Princeton University Press. ISBN 978-0-691-06942-5.) Given the well-established traditional connections between the fictional Dido and Aeneas and the historical Antony and Cleopatra, it is no surprise that Shakespeare includes numerous allusions to Virgil's epic in his historical tragedy. As Janet Adelman observes, "almost all the central elements in Antony and Cleopatra are to be found in the Aeneid: the opposing values of Rome and a foreign passion; the political necessity of a passionless Roman marriage; the concept of an afterlife in which the passionate lovers meet." However, as Heather James argues, Shakespeare's allusions to Virgil's Dido and Aeneas are far from slavish imitations. James emphasizes the various ways in which Shakespeare's play subverts the ideology of the Virgilian tradition; one such instance of this subversion is Cleopatra's dream of Antony in Act 5 ("I dreamt there was an Emperor Antony" [5.2.75]). James argues that in her extended description of this dream, Cleopatra "reconstructs the heroic masculinity of an Antony whose identity has been fragmented and scattered by Roman opinion." This politically charged dream vision is just one example of the way that Shakespeare's story destabilises and potentially critiques the Roman ideology inherited from Virgil's epic and embodied in the mythic Roman ancestor Aeneas.

=== Critical history: changing views of Cleopatra ===
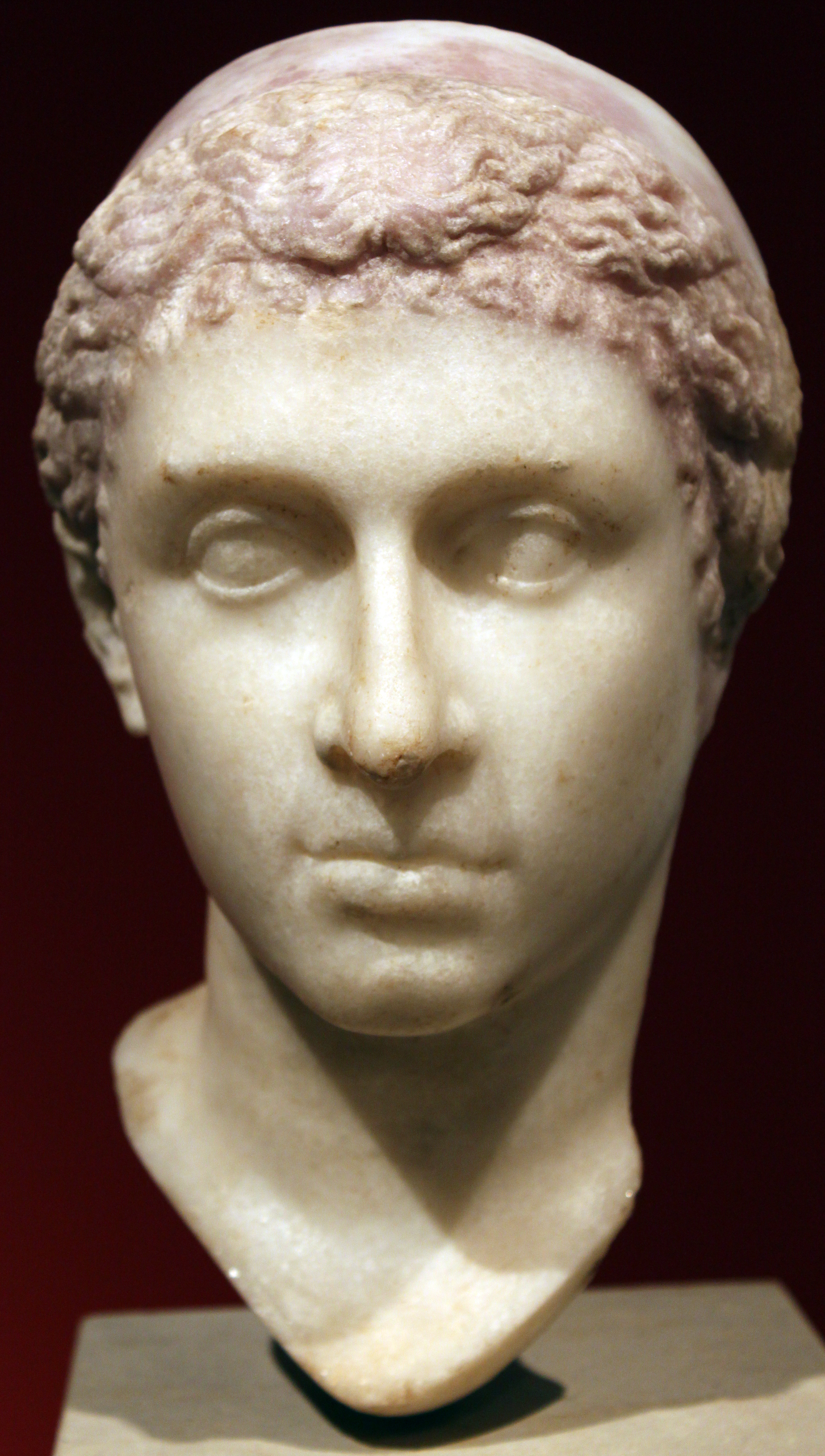
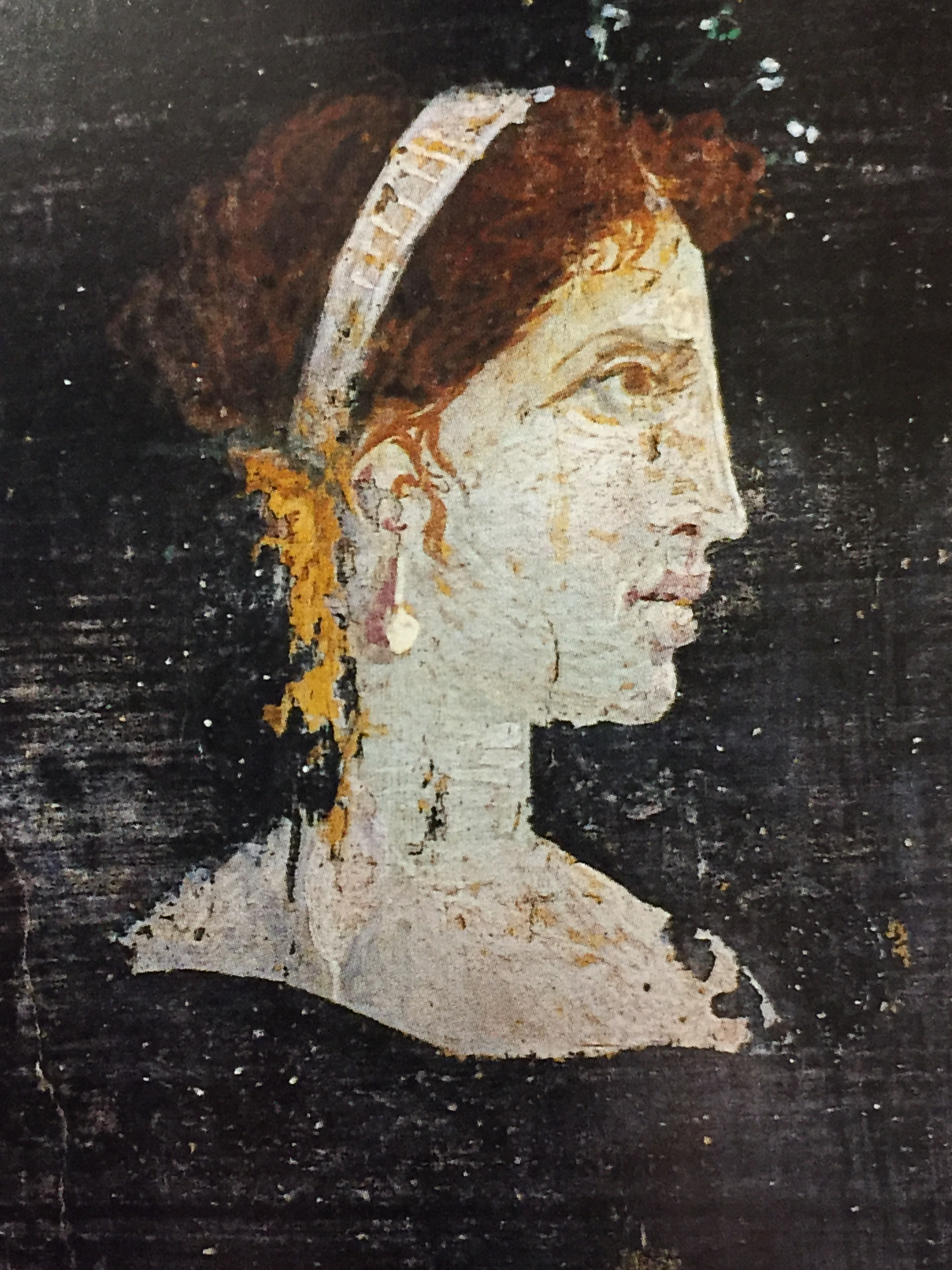
Left image: Cleopatra bust in the Altes Museum, Berlin, Roman artwork, 1st century BC
Right image: most likely a posthumous painted portrait of Cleopatra of Ptolemaic Egypt with red hair and her distinct facial features, wearing a royal diadem and pearl-studded hairpins, from Roman Herculaneum, Italy, mid-1st century AD

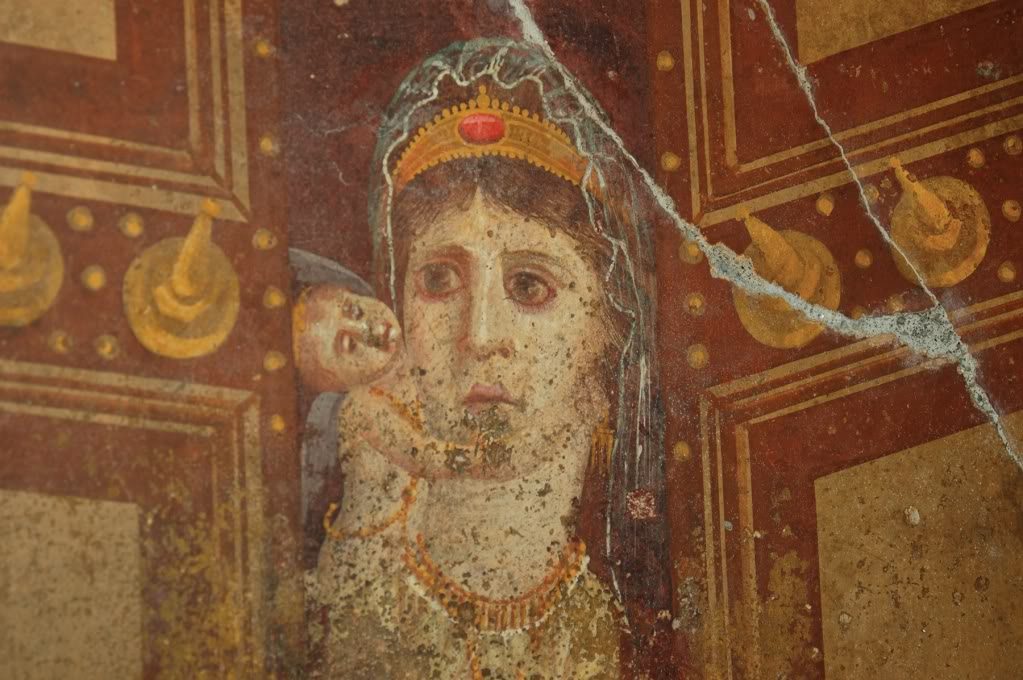
A Roman Second Style painting in the House of Marcus Fabius Rufus at Pompeii, Italy, depicting Cleopatra as Venus Genetrix and her son Caesarion as a cupid, mid-1st century BC

Cleopatra, being the complex figure that she is, has faced a variety of interpretations of character throughout history. Perhaps the most famous dichotomy is that of the manipulative seductress versus the skilled leader. Examining the critical history of the character of Cleopatra reveals that intellectuals of the 19th century and the early 20th century viewed her as merely an object of sexuality that could be understood and diminished rather than an imposing force with great poise and capacity for leadership.

This phenomenon is illustrated by the famous poet T. S. Eliot's take on Cleopatra. He saw her as "no wielder of power", but rather that her "devouring sexuality...diminishes her power". His language and writings use images of darkness, desire, beauty, sensuality, and carnality to portray not a strong, powerful woman, but a temptress. Throughout his writing on Antony and Cleopatra, Eliot refers to Cleopatra as material rather than person. He frequently calls her "thing". Eliot conveys the view of early critical history on the character of Cleopatra.

Other scholars also discuss early critics' views of Cleopatra in relation to a serpent signifying "original sin". The symbol of the serpent "functions, at the symbolic level, as a means of her submission, the phallic appropriation of the queen's body (and the land it embodies) by Octavius and the empire". The serpent, because it represents temptation, sin, and feminine weakness, is used by 19th and early 20th century critics to undermine Cleopatra's political authority and to emphasise the image of Cleopatra as manipulative seductress.

The postmodern view of Cleopatra is complex. Doris Adler suggests that, in a postmodern philosophical sense, we cannot begin to grasp the character of Cleopatra because, "In a sense it is a distortion to consider Cleopatra at any moment apart from the entire cultural milieu that creates and consumes Antony and Cleopatra on stage. However the isolation and microscopic examination of a single aspect apart from its host environment is an effort to improve the understanding of the broader context. In similar fashion, the isolation and examination of the stage image of Cleopatra becomes an attempt to improve the understanding of the theatrical power of her infinite variety and the cultural treatment of that power." So, as a microcosm, Cleopatra can be understood within a postmodern context, as long as one understands that the purpose for the examination of this microcosm is to further one's own interpretation of the work as a whole. Author L.T. Fitz believes that it is not possible to derive a clear, postmodern view of Cleopatra due to the sexism that all critics bring with them when they review her intricate character. She states specifically, "Almost all critical approaches to this play have been coloured by the sexist assumptions the critics have brought with them to their reading." One seemingly anti-sexist viewpoint comes from Donald C. Freeman's articulations of the meaning and significance of the deaths of both Antony and Cleopatra at the end of the play. Freeman states, "We understand Antony as a grand failure because the container of his Romanness "dislimns": it can no longer outline and define him even to himself. Conversely, we understand Cleopatra at her death as the transcendent queen of "immortal longings" because the container of her mortality can no longer restrain her: unlike Antony, she never melts, but sublimates from her very earthly flesh to ethereal fire and air."

These constant shifts in the perception of Cleopatra are well-represented in a review of Estelle Parsons' adaptation of Shakespeare's Antony and Cleopatra at the Interart Theatre in New York City. Arthur Holmberg surmises, "What had at first seemed like a desperate attempt to be chic in a trendy New York manner was, in fact, an ingenious way to characterise the differences between Antony's Rome and Cleopatra's Egypt. Most productions rely on rather predictable contrasts in costuming to imply the rigid discipline of the former and the languid self-indulgence of the latter. By exploiting ethnic differences in speech, gesture, and movement, Parsons rendered the clash between two opposing cultures not only contemporary but also poignant. In this setting, the white Egyptians represented a graceful and ancient aristocracy—well groomed, elegantly poised, and doomed. The Romans, upstarts from the West, lacked finesse and polish. But by sheer brute strength they would hold dominion over principalities and kingdoms." This assessment of the changing way in which Cleopatra is represented in modern adaptations of Shakespeare's play is yet another example of how the modern and postmodern view of Cleopatra is constantly evolving.

Cleopatra is a difficult character to pin down because there are multiple aspects of her personality of which we occasionally get a glimpse. However, the most dominant parts of her character seem to oscillate between a powerful ruler, a seductress, and a heroine of sorts. Power is one of Cleopatra's most dominant character traits and she uses it as a means of control. This thirst for control manifested itself through Cleopatra's initial seduction of Antony in which she was dressed as Aphrodite, the goddess of love, and made quite a calculated entrance in order to capture his attention. This sexualised act extends itself into Cleopatra's role as a seductress because it was her courage and unapologetic manner that leaves people remembering her as a "grasping, licentious harlot". However, despite her "insatiable sexual passion" she was still using these relationships as part of a grander political scheme, once again revealing how dominant Cleopatra's desire was for power. Due to Cleopatra's close relationship with power, she seems to take on the role of a heroine because there is something in her passion and intelligence that intrigues others. She was an autonomous and confident ruler, sending a powerful message about the independence and strength of women. Cleopatra had quite a wide influence, and still continues to inspire, making her a heroine to many.

=== Cleopatra's race ===
Theatrical portrayals of Cleopatra in Shakespeare and beyond have a complicated history. In the Pelican edition of Antony and Cleopatra, Professor Albert R. Braunmuller discusses how, in the play she is insulted by Philo by being called a "gypsy" which is a derivative of the word "Egyptian" but also evokes imagery of "Romany people, dark-haired, dark-skinned" which would be in line with a much more racialized version of Cleopatra. The other notable insult used towards Cleopatra in the play is when Philo calls her "tawny". Braunmuller notes that "tawny" is "hard to define historically" but that it "seems to have meant some brownish color, and Shakespeare elsewhere uses it to describe suntanned or sunburnt skin, which Elizabethan canons of beauty regarded as undesirable."

Braunmuller contextualizes all of this by reminding modern audiences that viewers and writers during Shakespeare's time would have had more complicated perspectives on race, ethnicity and related subjects and that their viewpoints were "extremely hard to define". There were also precursors to Shakespeare's Antony and Cleopatra that portrayed Cleopatra as having "Macedonian-Greek descent.

Pascale Aebischer's analysis of race in Shakespeare's Antony and Cleopatra further discusses the historically and culturally ambiguous nature of Cleopatra's race. The paper enters into and gives context to the existing academic conversation surrounding the racial identity of Shakespeare's Cleopatra. Aebischer reviews the historical portrayals leading up to and including Shakespeare's portrayal of Cleopatra and uses them to analyze the opposing analyses of Cleopatra as either black or white and also to look at how race even functioned during the time period that plays like this were written. She concludes that portrayals of Cleopatra have been historically complicated and varied widely. Although, factually, she was of European ethnic origin, her racial identity on stage becomes intertwined with the cultural and social identity she is portraying in a way that makes determining her precise racial identity difficult. Aebischer points to scholars like 'Linda Charnes [who] cannily observe, "descriptions of Cleopatra in [Shakespeare's] play are never more than descriptions of the effect she has on the onlooker"'. Aebischer eventually concludes that "we must accept that Shakespeare's Cleopatra is neither black nor white, but that should not stop us from appreciating the political significance of casting choices, nor should it fool us into thinking that, for a character like Cleopatra, any casting choice will ever be 'colourblind.'" Within the context of theatrical portrayals of Cleopatra, Aebischer asserts that "racial attributes are not properties that are embodied, but theatrical properties to be deployed and discarded at will."

=== Structure: Egypt and Rome ===
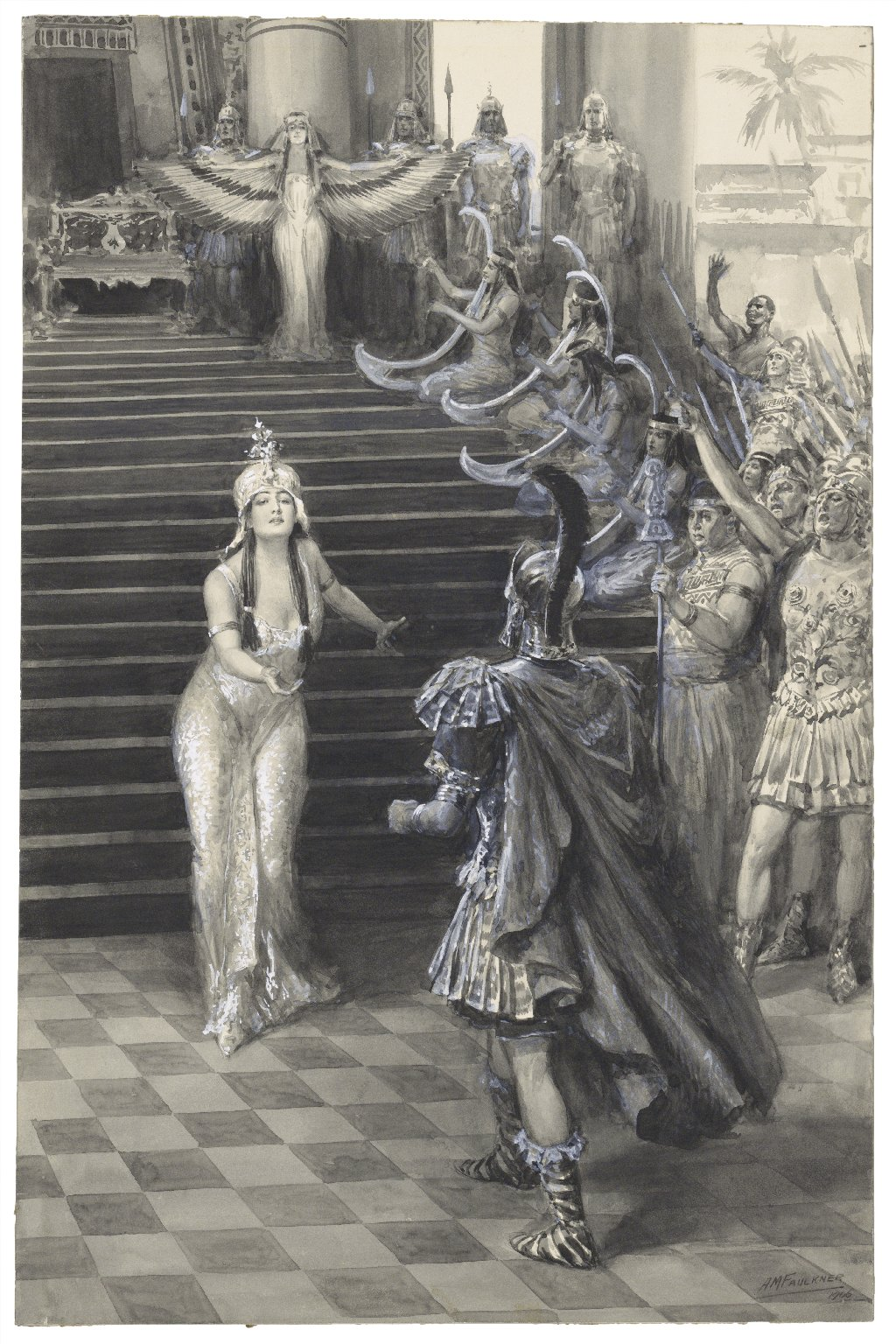
A drawing by Faulkner of Cleopatra greeting Antony

The relationship between Egypt and Rome in Antony and Cleopatra is central to understanding the plot, as the dichotomy allows the reader to gain more insight into the characters, their relationships, and the ongoing events that occur throughout the play. Shakespeare emphasises the differences between the two nations with his use of language and literary devices, which also highlight the different characterisations of the two countries by their own inhabitants and visitors. Literary critics have also spent many years developing arguments concerning the "masculinity" of Rome and the Romans and the "femininity" of Egypt and the Egyptians. In traditional criticism of Antony and Cleopatra, "Rome has been characterised as a male world, presided over by the austere Caesar, and Egypt as a female domain, embodied by a Cleopatra who is seen to be as abundant, leaky, and changeable as the Nile". In such a reading, male and female, Rome and Egypt, reason and emotion, and austerity and leisure are treated as mutually exclusive binaries that all interrelate with one another. The straightforwardness of the binary between male Rome and female Egypt has been challenged in later 20th-century criticism of the play: "In the wake of feminist, poststructuralist, and cultural-materialist critiques of gender essentialism, most modern Shakespeare scholars are inclined to be far more skeptical about claims that Shakespeare possessed a unique insight into a timeless 'femininity'." As a result, critics have been much more likely in recent years to describe Cleopatra as a character that confuses or deconstructs gender than as a character that embodies the feminine.

==== Literary devices used to convey the differences between Rome and Egypt ====
In Antony and Cleopatra, Shakespeare uses several literary techniques to convey a deeper meaning about the differences between Rome and Egypt. One example of this is his schema of the container as suggested by critic Donald Freeman in his article, "The rack dislimns." In his article, Freeman suggests that the container is representative of the body and the overall theme of the play that "knowing is seeing." In literary terms a schema refers to a plan throughout the work, which means that Shakespeare had a set path for unveiling the meaning of the "container" to the audience within the play. An example of the body in reference to the container can be seen in the following passage:

Nay, but this dotage of our general's
O'erflows the measure ...
His captain's heart,
Which in the scuffles of great fights hath burst
The buckles on his breast, reneges all temper
And is become the bellows and the fan
To cool a gypsy's lust. (1.1.1–2, 6–10)

The lack of tolerance exerted by the hard-edged Roman military code allots to a general's dalliance is metaphorised as a container, a measuring cup that cannot hold the liquid of Antony's grand passion. Later we also see Antony's heart-container swells again because it "o'erflows the measure." For Antony, the container of the Rome-world is confining and a "measure", while the container of the Egypt-world is liberating, an ample domain where he can explore. The contrast between the two is expressed in two of the play's famous speeches:

Let Rome in Tiber melt, and the wide arch
Of the ranged empire fall! Here is my space!
Kingdoms are clay!
(1.1.34–36)

For Rome to "melt is for it to lose its defining shape, the boundary that contains its civic and military codes." This schema is important in understanding Antony's grand failure because the Roman container can no longer outline or define him—even to himself. Conversely we come to understand Cleopatra in that the container of her mortality can no longer restrain her. Unlike Antony whose container melts, she gains a sublimity being released into the air.

In her article "Roman World, Egyptian Earth", critic Mary Thomas Crane introduces another symbol throughout the play: The four elements. In general, characters associated with Egypt perceive their world composed of the Aristotelian elements, which are earth, wind, fire and water. For Aristotle these physical elements were the centre of the universe and appropriately Cleopatra heralds her coming death when she proclaims, "I am fire and air; my other elements/I give to baser life", (5.2.289–290). Romans, on the other hand, seem to have left behind that system, replacing it with a subjectivity separated from and overlooking the natural world and imagining itself as able to control it. These differing systems of thought and perception result in very different versions of nation and empire. Shakespeare's relatively positive representation of Egypt has sometimes been read as nostalgia for an heroic past. Because the Aristotelian elements were a declining theory in Shakespeare's time, it can also be read as nostalgia for a waning theory of the material world, the pre-seventeenth-century cosmos of elements and humours that rendered subject and world deeply interconnected and saturated with meaning. Thus this reflects the difference between the Egyptians who are interconnected with the elemental earth and the Romans in their dominating the hard-surfaced, impervious world.

Critics also suggest that the political attitudes of the main characters are an allegory for the political atmosphere of Shakespeare's time. According to Paul Lawrence Rose in his article "The Politics of Antony and Cleopatra", the views expressed in the play of "national solidarity, social order and strong rule" were familiar after the absolute monarchies of Henry VII and Henry VIII and the political disaster involving Mary Queen of Scots. Essentially the political themes throughout the play are reflective of the different models of rule during Shakespeare's time. The political attitudes of Antony, Caesar, and Cleopatra are all basic archetypes for the conflicting sixteenth-century views of kingship. Caesar is representative of the ideal king, who brings about the Pax Romana similar to the political peace established under the Tudors. His cold demeanour is representative of what the sixteenth century thought to be a side-effect of political genius. Conversely, Antony's focus is on valour and chivalry, and Antony views the political power of victory as a by-product of both. Cleopatra's power has been described as "naked, hereditary, and despotic", and it is argued that she is reminiscent of Mary Tudor's reign—implying it is not coincidence that she brings about the "doom of Egypt." This is in part due to an emotional comparison in their rule. Cleopatra, who was emotionally invested in Antony, brought about the downfall of Egypt in her commitment to love, whereas Mary Tudor's emotional attachment to Catholicism fates her rule. The political implications within the play reflect on Shakespeare's England in its message that Impact is not a match for Reason.

==== The characterization of Rome and Egypt ====
Critics have often used the opposition between Rome and Egypt in Antony and Cleopatra to set forth defining characteristics of the various characters. While some characters are distinctly Egyptian, others are distinctly Roman, some are torn between the two, and still others attempt to remain neutral. Critic James Hirsh has stated that, "as a result, the play dramatises not two but four main figurative locales: Rome as it is perceived from a Roman point of view; Rome as it is perceived from an Egyptian point of view; Egypt as it is perceived from a Roman point of view; and Egypt as it is perceived from an Egyptian point of view."

===== Rome from the Roman perspective =====
According to Hirsh, Rome largely defines itself by its opposition to Egypt. Where Rome is viewed as structured, moral, mature, and essentially masculine, Egypt is the polar opposite; chaotic, immoral, immature, and feminine. In fact, even the distinction between masculine and feminine is a purely Roman idea which the Egyptians largely ignore. The Romans view the "world" as nothing more than something for them to conquer and control. They believe they are "impervious to environmental influence" and that they are not to be influenced and controlled by the world but vice versa.

===== Rome from the Egyptian perspective =====
The Egyptians view the Romans as boring, oppressive, strict and lacking in passion and creativity, preferring strict rules and regulations.

===== Egypt from the Egyptian perspective =====
The Egyptian worldview reflects what Mary Floyd-Wilson has called geo-humoralism, or the belief that climate and other environmental factors shapes racial character. The Egyptians view themselves as deeply entwined with the natural "earth". Egypt is not a location for them to rule over, but an inextricable part of them. Cleopatra envisions herself as the embodiment of Egypt because she has been nurtured and moulded by the environment fed by "the dung, / The beggar's nurse and Caesar's" (5.2.7–8). They view life as more fluid and less structured allowing for creativity and passionate pursuits.

===== Egypt from the Roman perspective =====
The Romans view the Egyptians essentially as improper. Their passion for life is continuously viewed as irresponsible, indulgent, over-sexualised and disorderly. The Romans view Egypt as a distraction that can send even the best men off course. This is demonstrated in the following passage describing Antony.

Boys who, being mature in knowledge,
Pawn their experience to their present pleasure,
And so rebel judgment.
(1.4.31–33)

Ultimately the dichotomy between Rome and Egypt is used to distinguish two sets of conflicting values between two different locales. Yet, it goes beyond this division to show the conflicting sets of values not only between two cultures but within cultures, even within individuals. As John Gillies has argued "the 'orientalism' of Cleopatra's court—with its luxury, decadence, splendour, sensuality, appetite, effeminacy and eunuchs—seems a systematic inversion of the legendary Roman values of temperance, manliness, courage". While some characters fall completely into the category of Roman or Egyptian (Octavius as Roman, Cleopatra Egyptian) others, such as Antony, cannot choose between the two conflicting locales and cultures. Instead he oscillates between the two. In the beginning of the play Cleopatra calls attention to this saying

He was dispos'd to mirth, but on the sudden
A Roman thought hath strook him.
(1.2.82–83)

This shows Antony's willingness to embrace the pleasures of Egyptian life, yet his tendency to still be drawn back into Roman thoughts and ideas.

Orientalism plays a very specific, and yet, nuanced role in the story of Antony and Cleopatra. A more specific term comes to mind, from Richmond Barbour, that of proto-orientalism, that is orientalism before the age of imperialism. This puts Antony and Cleopatra in an interesting period of time, one that existed before the West knew much about what would eventually be called the Orient, but still a time when it was known that there were lands beyond Europe. This allowed Shakespeare to use widespread assumptions about the "exotic" east with little academic recourse. It could be said that Antony and Cleopatra and their relationship represent the first meeting of the two cultures in a literary sense, and that this relationship would lay the foundation for the idea of Western superiority vs. Eastern inferiority. The case could also be made that at least in a literary sense, the relationship between Antony and Cleopatra was some people's first exposure to an inter-racial relationship, and in a major way. This plays into the idea that Cleopatra has been made out to be an "other", with terms used to describe her like "gypsy". And it is this otherization that is at the heart of the piece itself, the idea that Antony, a man of Western origin and upbringing has coupled himself with the Eastern women, the stereotypical "other".

==== Evolving views of critics regarding gender characterizations ====
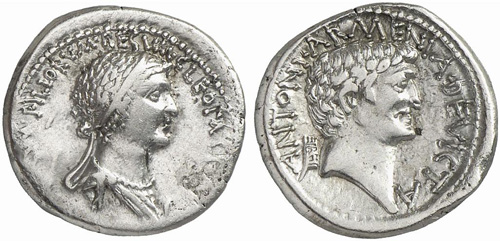
A denarius minted in 32 BC; on the obverse is a diademed portrait of Cleopatra, with the Latin inscription "CLEOPATRA[E REGINAE REGVM]FILIORVM REGVM", and on the reverse a portrait of Mark Antony with the inscription reading "ANTONI ARMENIA DEVICTA".

Feminist criticism of Antony and Cleopatra has provided a more in-depth reading of the play, has challenged previous norms for criticism, and has opened a larger discussion of the characterization of Egypt and Rome. However, as Gayle Greene so aptly recognises, it must be addressed that "feminist criticism [of Shakespeare] is nearly as concerned with the biases of Shakespeare's interpretors [sic]—critics, directors, editors—as with Shakespeare himself."

Feminist scholars, in respect to Antony and Cleopatra, often examine Shakespeare's use of language when describing Rome and Egypt. Through his language, such scholars argue, he tends to characterise Rome as "masculine" and Egypt as "feminine." According to Gayle Greene, "the 'feminine' world of love and personal relationships is secondary to the 'masculine' world of war and politics, [and] has kept us from realizing that Cleopatra is the play's protagonist, and so skewed our perceptions of character, theme, and structure." The highlighting of these starkly contrasting qualities of the two backdrops of Antony and Cleopatra, in both Shakespeare's language and the words of critics, brings attention to the characterization of the title characters, since their respective countries are meant to represent and emphasise their attributes.

The feminine categorization of Egypt, and subsequently Cleopatra, was negatively portrayed throughout early criticism. The story of Antony and Cleopatra was often summarised as either "the fall of a great general, betrayed in his dotage by a treacherous strumpet, or else it can be viewed as a celebration of transcendental love." In both reduced summaries, Egypt and Cleopatra are presented as either the destruction of Antony's masculinity and greatness or as agents in a love story. Once the Women's Liberation Movement grew between the 1960s and 1980s, however, critics began to take a closer look at both Shakespeare's characterization of Egypt and Cleopatra and the work and opinions of other critics on the same matter.

Jonathan Gil Harris claims that the Egypt vs. Rome dichotomy many critics often adopt does not only represent a "gender polarity" but also a "gender hierarchy". Critical approaches to Antony and Cleopatra from the beginning of the 20th century mostly adopt a reading that places Rome as higher in the hierarchy than Egypt. Early critics like Georg Brandes presented Egypt as a lesser nation because of its lack of rigidity and structure and presented Cleopatra, negatively, as "the woman of women, quintessentiated Eve." Egypt and Cleopatra are both represented by Brandes as uncontrollable because of their connection with the Nile River and Cleopatra's "infinite variety" (2.2.236).

In more recent years, critics have taken a closer look at previous readings of Antony and Cleopatra and have found several aspects overlooked. Egypt was previously characterised as the nation of the feminine attributes of lust and desire while Rome was more controlled. However, Harris points out that Caesar and Antony both possess an uncontrollable desire for Egypt and Cleopatra: Caesar's is political while Antony's is personal. Harris further implies that Romans have an uncontrollable lust and desire for "what they do not or cannot have." For example, Antony only desires his wife Fulvia after she is dead:

There's a great spirit gone! Thus did I desire it:
What our contempt doth often hurl from us,
We wish it ours again; the present pleasure,
By revolution lowering, does become
The opposite of itself: she's good, being gone:
The hand could pluck her back that shov'd her on.
(1.2.119–124)

In this way, Harris is suggesting that Rome is no higher on any "gender hierarchy" than Egypt.

L. T. Fitz outwardly claims that early criticism of Antony and Cleopatra is "colored by the sexist assumptions the critics have brought with them to their reading." Fitz argues that previous criticisms place a heavy emphasis on Cleopatra's "wicked and manipulative" ways, which are further emphasised by her association with Egypt and her contrast to the "chaste and submissive" Roman Octavia. Finally, Fitz emphasises the tendency of early critics to assert that Antony is the sole protagonist of the play. This claim is apparent in Brandes‘ argument: "when [Antony] perishes, a prey to the voluptuousness of the East, it seems as though Roman greatness and the Roman Republic expires with him." Yet Fitz points out that Antony dies in Act IV while Cleopatra (and therefore Egypt) is present throughout Act V until she commits suicide at the end and "would seem to fulfill at least the formal requirements of the tragic hero."

These criticisms are only a few examples of how the critical views of Egypt's "femininity" and Rome's "masculinity" have changed over time and how the development of feminist theory has helped in widening the discussion.

=== Themes and motifs ===
==== Ambiguity and opposition ====
Relativity and ambiguity are prominent ideas in the play, and the audience is challenged to come to conclusions about the ambivalent nature of many of the characters. The relationship between Antony and Cleopatra can easily be read as one of love or lust; their passion can be construed as being wholly destructive but also showing elements of transcendence. Cleopatra might be said to kill herself out of love for Antony, or because she has lost political power. Octavius can be seen as either a noble and good ruler, only wanting what is right for Rome, or as a cruel and ruthless politician.

A major theme running through the play is opposition. Throughout the play, oppositions between Rome and Egypt, love and lust, and masculinity and femininity are emphasised, subverted, and commented on. One of Shakespeare's most famous speeches, drawn almost verbatim from North's translation of Plutarch's Lives, Enobarbus' description of Cleopatra on her barge, is full of opposites resolved into a single meaning, corresponding with these wider oppositions that characterise the rest of the play:

The barge she sat in, like a burnish'd throne,
Burn'd on the water...
...she did lie
In her pavilion—cloth-of-gold of tissue—
O'er-picturing that Venus where we see
The fancy outwork nature: on each side her
Stood pretty dimpled boys, like smiling Cupids,
With divers-colour'd fans, whose wind did seem
To glow the delicate cheeks which they did cool,
And what they undid did. (Act 2, Scene 2)

Cleopatra herself sees Antony as both the Gorgon and Mars (Act 2 Scene 5, lines 118–119).

===== Theme of ambivalence =====
The play is accurately structured with paradox and ambivalence in order to convey the antitheses that make Shakespeare's work remarkable. Ambivalence in this play is the contrasting response of one's own character. It may be perceived as opposition between word and deed but not to be confused with "duality." For example, after Antony abandons his army during the sea battle to follow Cleopatra, he expresses his remorse and pain in his famous speech:

All is lost;
This foul Egyptian hath betrayed me:
My fleet hath yielded to the foe; and yonder
They cast their caps up and carouse together
Like friends long lost. Triple-turn'd whore! 'tis thou
Hast sold me to this novice; and my heart
Makes only wars on thee. Bid them all fly;
For when I am revenged upon my charm,
I have done all. Bid them all fly; begone. [Exit SCARUS]
O sun, thy uprise shall I see no more:
Fortune and Antony part here; even here
Do we shake hands. All come to this? The hearts
That spaniel'd me at heels, to whom I gave
Their wishes, do discandy, melt their sweets
On blossoming Caesar; and this pine is bark'd,
That overtopp'd them all. Betray'd I am:
O this false soul of Egypt! this grave charm,—
Whose eye beck'd forth my wars, and call'd them home;
Whose bosom was my crownet, my chief end,—
Like a right gipsy, hath, at fast and loose,
Beguiled me to the very heart of loss.
What, Eros, Eros! [Enter CLEOPATRA] Ah, thou spell! Avaunt! (IV.12.2913–2938)

However, he then strangely says to Cleopatra: "All that is won and lost. Give me a kiss. Even this repays me"(3.12.69–70). Antony's speech conveys pain and anger, but he acts in opposition to his emotions and words, all for the love of Cleopatra. Literary critic Joyce Carol Oates explains: "Antony's agony is curiously muted for someone who has achieved and lost so much." This irony gap between word and deed of the characters results in a theme of ambivalence. Moreover, due to the flow of constant changing emotions throughout the play: "the characters do not know each other, nor can we know them, any more clearly than we know ourselves". However, it is believed by critics that opposition is what makes good fiction. Another example of ambivalence in Antony and Cleopatra is in the opening act of the play when Cleopatra asks Anthony: "Tell me how much you love." Tzachi Zamir points out: "The persistence of doubt is in perpetual tension with the opposing need for certainty" and he refers to the persistence of doubt that derives from the contradiction of word and deed in the characters.

==== Betrayal ====
Betrayal is a recurring theme throughout the play. At one time or another, almost every character betrays their country, ethics, or a companion. However, certain characters waver between betrayal and loyalty. This struggle is most apparent in the actions of Cleopatra, Enobarbus, and most importantly Antony. Antony mends ties with his Roman roots and alliance with Caesar by entering into a marriage with Octavia, but he returns to Cleopatra. Diana Kleiner points out, "Anthony's perceived betrayal of Rome was greeted with public calls for war with Egypt". Although he vows to remain loyal in his marriage, his impulses and unfaithfulness to his Roman roots are what ultimately lead to war. Cleopatra twice abandons Antony during battle and whether out of fear or political motives, she deceived Antony. When Thidias, Caesar's messenger, tells Cleopatra Caesar will show her mercy if she will relinquish Antony, she is quick to respond:

"Most kind messenger,
Say to great Caesar this in deputation:
I kiss his conqu'ring hand. Tell him I am prompt
To lay my crown at 's feet, and there to kneel." (III.13.75–79)

Shakespeare critic Sara Deats says Cleopatra's betrayal fell "on the successful fencing with Octavius that leaves her to be "noble to [herself]". However, she quickly reconciles with Antony, reaffirming her loyalty towards him and never truly submitting to Caesar. Enobarbus, Antony's most devoted friend, betrays Antony when he deserts him in favour of Caesar. But he exclaims, "I fight against thee! / No: I will go seek some ditch wherein to die" (IV. 6. 38–39). Although he abandoned Antony, critic Kent Cartwright claims Enobarbus' death "uncovers his greater love" for him considering it was caused by the guilt for what he had done to his friend, thus adding to the confusion of the characters' loyalty and betrayal that previous critics have also discovered. Even though loyalty is central to secure alliances, Shakespeare is making a point with the theme of betrayal by exposing how people in power cannot be trusted, no matter how honest their word may seem. The characters' loyalty and validity of promises are constantly called into question. The perpetual swaying between alliances strengthens the ambiguity and uncertainty amid the characters' loyalty and disloyalty.

==== Power dynamics ====
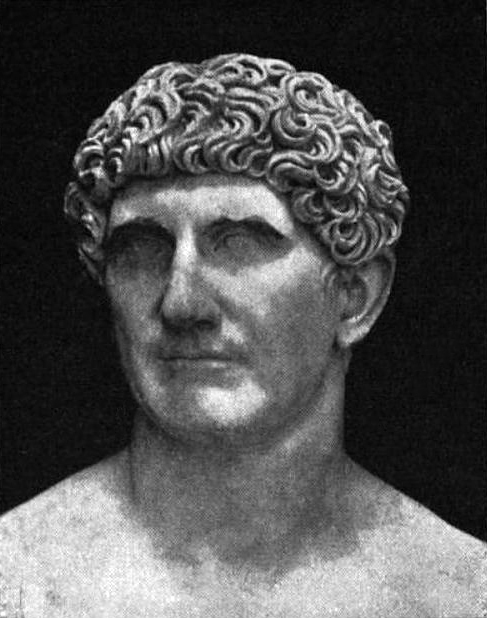
A Roman bust of the consul and triumvir Mark Antony, Vatican Museums

As a play concerning the relationship between two empires, the dynamics of power becomes a recurring theme. Antony and Cleopatra battle over this dynamic as heads of state, yet the theme of power also resonates in their romantic relationship. The Roman ideal of power lies in a political nature taking a base in economical control. As an imperialist power, Rome takes its power in the ability to change the world. As a Roman man, Antony is expected to fulfill certain qualities pertaining to his Roman masculine power, especially in the war arena and in his duty as a soldier:

Those his goodly eyes,
That o'er the files and musters of the war
Have glowed like plated mars, now bend, now turn
The office and devotion of their view
Upon a tawny front. His captain's heart,
Which in the scuffles of greatness hath burst
The buckles on his breast, reneges all tempers,
And is becomes the bellows and the fan
To cool a gipsy's lust.

Cleopatra's character is slightly unpindown-able, as her character identity retains a certain aspect of mystery. She embodies the mystical, exotic, and dangerous nature of Egypt as the "serpent of old Nile". Critic Lisa Starks says that "Cleopatra [comes] to signify the double-image of the "temptress/goddess". She is continually described in unearthly terms, extending to her description as the goddess Venus.

...For her own person,
It beggared all description. She did lie
In her pavilion—cloth of gold, of tissue—
O'er-picturing that Venus where we see
The fancy outwork nature.

This mysteriousness connected with the supernatural not only captures the audience and Antony, but also draws all other characters' focus. As a subject of conversation even when not present in the scene, Cleopatra is continually a central point, therefore demanding control of the stage. As an object of sexual desire, she is connected to the Roman need to conquer. Her mixture of sexual prowess with political power is a threat to Roman politics. She retains her deep involvement in the military aspect of her rule, especially when she asserts herself as "the president of [her] kingdom will/ Appear there for a man." Where the dominating power lies is up for interpretation, yet there are several mentions of the power exchange in their relationship in the text. Antony remarks on Cleopatra's power over him multiple times throughout the play, the most obvious being sexual innuendo: "You did know / How much you were my conqueror, and that / My sword, made weak by my affection, would / Obey it on all cause."

==== Use of language in power dynamics ====
Manipulation and the quest for power are very prominent themes not only in the play but specifically in the relationship between Antony and Cleopatra. Both utilise language to undermine the power of the other and to heighten their own sense of power.

Cleopatra uses language to undermine Antony's assumed authority over her. Cleopatra's "'Roman' language of command works to undermine Antony's authority." By using a Romanesque rhetoric, Cleopatra commands Antony and others in Antony's own style. In their first exchange in Act I, scene 1, Cleopatra says to Antony, "I'll set a bourn how far to be beloved." In this case Cleopatra speaks in an authoritative and affirming sense to her lover, which to Shakespeare's audience would be uncharacteristic for a female lover.

Antony's language suggests his struggle for power against Cleopatra's dominion. Antony's "obsessive language concerned with structure, organization, and maintenance for the self and empire in repeated references to 'measure,' 'property,' and 'rule' express unconscious anxieties about boundary integrity and violation." (Hooks 38) Furthermore, Antony struggles with his infatuation with Cleopatra and this paired with Cleopatra's desire for power over him causes his eventual downfall. He states in Act I, scene 2, "These strong Egyptian fetters I must break,/Or lose myself in dotage." Antony feels restrained by "Egyptian fetters" indicating that he recognises Cleopatra's control over him. He also mentions losing himself in dotage—"himself" referring to Antony as Roman ruler and authority over people including Cleopatra.

Cleopatra also succeeds in causing Antony to speak in a more theatrical sense and therefore undermine his own true authority. In Act I, scene 1, Antony not only speaks again of his empire but constructs a theatrical image: "Let Rome and Tiber melt, and the wide arch/Of the ranged empire fall... The nobleness of life/Is to do thus; when such a mutual pair/And such a twain can do't—in which I bind/On pain of punishment the world to weet/We stand up peerless." Cleopatra immediately says, "Excellent falsehood!" in an aside, indicating to the audience that she intends for Antony to adopt this rhetoric.

Yachnin's article focuses on Cleopatra's usurping of Antony's authority through her own and his language, while Hooks' article gives weight to Antony's attempts to assert his authority through rhetoric. Both articles indicate the lovers' awareness of each other's quests for power. Despite awareness and the political power struggle existent in the play, Antony and Cleopatra both fail to achieve their goals by the play's conclusion.

==== Performing gender and crossdressing ====
===== The performance of gender =====
Antony and Cleopatra is essentially a male-dominated play in which the character of Cleopatra takes significance as one of few female figures and definitely the only strong female character. As Oriana Palusci says in her article "When Boys or Women Tell Their Dreams: Cleopatra and the Boy Actor", "Cleopatra constantly occupies the centre, if not of the stage, certainly of the discourse, often charged with sexual innuendos and disparaging tirades, of the male Roman world". We see the significance of this figure by the constant mention of her, even when she is not on stage.

What is said about Cleopatra is not always what one would normally say about a ruler; the image that is created makes the audience expect "to see on stage not a noble Sovereign, but a dark, dangerous, evil, sensual and lewd creature who has harnessed the 'captain's heart". This dangerously beautiful woman is difficult for Shakespeare to create because all characters, male or female, were played by men. Phyllis Rackin points out that one of the most descriptive scenes of Cleopatra is spoken by Enobarbus: "in his famous set speech, Enobarbus evokes Cleopatra's arrival on the Cynus". It is an elaborate description that could never possibly be portrayed by a young boy actor. It is in this way that "before the boy [playing Cleopatra] can evoke Cleopatra's greatness, he must remind us that he cannot truly represent it". The images of Cleopatra must be described rather than seen on stage. Rackin points out that "it is a commonplace of the older criticism that Shakespeare had to rely upon his poetry and his audience's imagination to evoke Cleopatra's greatness because he knew the boy actor could not depict it convincingly".

The constant comments of the Romans about Cleopatra often undermine her, representing the Roman thought on the foreign and particularly of Egyptians. From the perspective of the reason-driven Romans, Shakespeare's "Egyptian queen repeatedly violates the rules of decorum". It is because of this distaste that Cleopatra "embodies political power, a power which is continuously underscored, denied, nullified by the Roman counterpart". To many of Antony's crew, his actions appear extravagant and over the top: "Antony's devotion is inordinate and therefore irrational". It is no wonder, then, that she is such a subordinated queen.

And yet she is also shown as having real power in the play. When threatened to be made a fool and fully overpowered by Octavius, she takes her own life: "She is not to be silenced by the new master, she is the one who will silence herself: 'My resolution and my hands I'll trust/ None about Caesar' (IV. 15.51–52)". From this, connections can be made between power and the performance of the female role as portrayed by Cleopatra.

===== Interpretations of crossdressing within the play =====
Scholars have speculated that Shakespeare's original intention was to have Antony appear in Cleopatra's clothes and vice versa in the beginning of the play. This possible interpretation seems to perpetuate the connections being made between gender and power. Gordon P. Jones elaborates on the importance of this detail:

Such a saturnalian exchange of costumes in the opening scene would have opened up a number of important perspectives for the play's original audience. It would immediately have established the sportiveness of the lovers. It would have provided a specific theatrical context for Cleopatra's later reminiscence about another occasion on which she "put my tires and mantles on him, whilst / I wore his sword Philippan" (II.v.22–23). It would have prepared the ground for Cleopatra's subsequent insistence on appearing "for a man" (III.vii.18) to bear a charge in the war; in doing so, it would also have prepared the audience for Antony's demeaning acquiescence in her usurpation of the male role.

The evidence that such a costume change was intended includes Enobarbus' false identification of Cleopatra as Antony:

Domitius Enobarbus: Hush! here comes Antony.
Charmian: Not he; the queen.

Enobarbus could have made this error because he was used to seeing Antony in the queen's garments. It can also be speculated that Philo was referring to Antony cross-dressing in Act 1, scene 1:

Philo: Sir, sometimes, when he is not Antony,
He comes too short of that great property
Which still should go with Antony.

In the context of cross-dressing, "not Antony" could mean "when Antony is dressed as Cleopatra."

If Shakespeare had indeed intended for Antony to crossdress, it would have drawn even more similarities between Antony and Hercules, a comparison that many scholars have noted many times before. Hercules (who is said to be an ancestor of Antony) was forced to wear Queen Omphale's clothing while he was her indentured servant. The Omphale myth is an exploration of gender roles in Greek society. Shakespeare might have paid homage to this myth as a way of exploring gender roles in his own.

However, it has been noted that, while women dressing as men (i.e., a boy actor acting a female character who dresses as a man) are common in Shakespeare, the reverse (i.e., a male adult actor dressing as a woman) is all but non-existent, leaving aside Antony's debated case.

===== Critics' interpretations of boys portraying female characters =====
Antony and Cleopatra also contains self-references to the crossdressing as it would have been performed historically on the London stage. For instance, in Act Five, Scene Two, Cleopatra exclaims, "Antony/ Shall be brought drunken forth, and I shall see/ Some squeaking Cleopatra boy my greatness/ I'th' posture of a whore" (ll. 214–217). Many scholars interpret these lines as a metatheatrical reference to Shakespeare's own production, and by doing so comments on his own stage. Shakespeare critics such as Tracey Sedinger interpret this as Shakespeare's critique of the London stage, which, by the perpetuation of boy actors playing the part of the woman, serves to establish the superiority of the male spectator's sexuality. The male-male relationship, some critics have offered, between the male audience and the boy actor performing the female sexuality of the play would have been less threatening than had the part been played by a woman. It is in this manner that the London stage cultivated in its audience a chaste and obedient female subject, while positioning male sexuality as dominant. Shakespeare critics argue that the metatheatrical references in Antony and Cleopatra seem to critique this trend and the presentation of Cleopatra as a sexually empowered individual supports their argument that Shakespeare seems to be questioning the oppression of female sexuality in London society. The crossdresser, then, is not a visible object but rather a structure "enacting the failure of a dominant epistemology in which knowledge is equated with visibility". What is being argued here is that the cross-dressing on the London stage challenges the dominant epistemology of Elizabethan society that associated sight with knowledge. The boy actors portraying female sexuality on the London stage contradicted such a simple ontology.

Critics such as Rackin interpret Shakespeare's metatheatrical references to the crossdressing on stage with less concern for societal elements and more of a focus on the dramatic ramifications. Rackin argues in her article on "Shakespeare's Boy Cleopatra" that Shakespeare manipulates the crossdressing to highlight a motif of the play—recklessness—which is discussed in the article as the recurring elements of acting without properly considering the consequences. Rackin cites the same quote, "Antony/ Shall be brought drunken forth, and I shall see/ Some squeaking Cleopatra boy my greatness/ I'th' posture of a whore" to make the argument that here the audience is reminded of the very same treatment Cleopatra is receiving on Shakespeare's stage (since she is being portrayed by a boy actor) (V.ii.214–217). Shakespeare, utilizing the metatheatrical reference to his own stage, perpetuates his motif of recklessness by purposefully shattering "the audience's acceptance of the dramatic illusion".

Other critics argue that the crossdressing as it occurs in the play is less of a mere convention, and more of an embodiment of dominant power structures. Critics such as Charles Forker argue that the boy actors were a result of what "we may call androgyny". His article argues that "women were barred from the stage for their own sexual protection" and because "patriarchally acculturated audiences presumably found it intolerable to see English women—those who would represent mothers, wives, and daughters—in sexually compromising situations". Essentially, the crossdressing occurs as a result of the patriarchally structured society.

==== Empire ====
===== Sexuality and empire =====
The textual motif of empire within Antony and Cleopatra has strong gendered and erotic undercurrents. Antony, the Roman soldier characterised by a certain effeminacy, is the main article of conquest, falling first to Cleopatra and then to Caesar (Octavius). Cleopatra's triumph over her lover is attested to by Caesar himself, who gibes that Antony "is not more manlike/ Than Cleopatra; nor the queen of Ptolemy/ More womanly than he" (1.4.5–7). That Cleopatra takes on the role of male aggressor in her relationship with Antony should not be surprising; after all, "a culture attempting to dominate another culture will [often] endow itself with masculine qualities and the culture it seeks to dominate with feminine ones"—appropriately, the queen's romantic assault is frequently imparted in a political, even militaristic fashion. Antony's subsequent loss of manhood seemingly "signifies his lost Romanness, and Act 3, Scene 10, is a virtual litany of his lost and feminised self, his "wounder chance". Throughout the play, Antony is gradually bereaved of that Roman quality so coveted in his nostalgic interludes—by the centremost scenes, his sword (a plainly phallic image), he tells Cleopatra, has been "made weak by his affection" (3.11.67). In Act 4, Scene 14, "an un-Romaned Antony" laments, "O, thy vile lady!/ She has robb'd me of my sword", (22–23)—critic Arthur L. Little Jr. writes that here "he seems to echo closely the victim of raptus, of bride theft, who has lost the sword she wishes to turn against herself. By the time Antony tries to use his sword to kill himself, it amounts to little more than a stage prop". Antony is reduced to a political object, "the pawn in a power game between Caesar and Cleopatra".

Having failed to perform Roman masculinity and virtue, Antony's only means with which he might "write himself into Rome's imperial narrative and position himself at the birth of empire" is to cast himself in the feminine archetype of the sacrificial virgin; "once [he] understands his failed virtus, his failure to be Aeneas, he then tries to emulate Dido". Antony and Cleopatra can be read as a rewrite of Virgil's epic, with the sexual roles reversed and sometimes inverted. James J Greene writes on the subject: "If one of the seminally powerful myths in the cultural memory of our past is Aeneas' rejection of his African queen in order to go on and found the Roman Empire, than it is surely significant that Shakespeare's [sic]... depicts precisely and quite deliberately the opposite course of action from that celebrated by Virgil. For Antony... turned his back for the sake of his African queen on that same Roman state established by Aeneas". Antony even attempts to commit suicide for his love, falling short in the end. He is incapable of "occupying the... politically empowering place" of the female sacrificial victim. The abundant imagery concerning his person—"of penetration, wounds, blood, marriage, orgasm, and shame"—informs the view of some critics that the Roman "figures Antony's body as queer, that is, as an open male body... [he] not only 'bends' in devotion' but... bends over". In reciprocal contrast, "in both Caesar and Cleopatra we see very active wills and energetic pursuit of goals". While Caesar's empirical objective can be considered strictly political, however, Cleopatra's is explicitly erotic; she conquers carnally—indeed, "she made great Caesar lay his sword to bed;/ He plough'd her, and she cropp'd" (2.2.232–233). Her mastery is unparalleled when it comes to the seduction of certain powerful individuals, but popular criticism supports the notion that "as far as Cleopatra is concerned, the main thrust of the play's action might be described as a machine especially devised to bend her to the Roman will... and no doubt Roman order is sovereign at the end of the play. But instead of driving her down to ignominy, the Roman power forces her upward to nobility". Caesar says of her final deed, "Bravest at the last,/ She levelled at our purposes, and, being royal,/ Took her own way" (5.2.325–327).

Arthur L. Little, in agitative fashion, suggests that the desire to overcome the queen has a corporeal connotation: "If a black—read foreign—man raping a white woman encapsulates an iconographic truth... of the dominant society's sexual, racial, national, and imperial fears, a white man raping a black woman becomes the evidentiary playing out of its self-assured and cool stranglehold over these representative foreign bodies". Furthermore, he writes, "Rome shapes its Egyptian imperial struggle most visually around the contours of Cleopatra's sexualised and racialised black body—most explicitly her "tawny front", her "gipsy's lust", and her licentious climactic genealogy, "with Phoebus' amorous pinches black". In a similar vein, essayist David Quint contends that "with Cleopatra the opposition between East and West is characterised in terms of gender: the otherness of the Easterner becomes the otherness of the opposite sex". Quint argues that Cleopatra (not Antony) fulfils Virgil's Dido archetype; "woman is subordinated as is generally the case in The Aeneid, excluded from power and the process of Empire-building: this exclusion is evident in the poem's fiction where Creusa disappears and Dido is abandoned... woman's place or displacement is therefore in the East, and epic features a series of oriental heroines whose seductions are potentially more perilous than Eastern arms", i.e., Cleopatra.

===== Politics of empire =====
Antony and Cleopatra deals ambiguously with the politics of imperialism and colonization. Critics have long been invested in untangling the web of political implications that characterise the play. Interpretations of the work often rely on an understanding of Egypt and Rome as they respectively signify Elizabethan ideals of East and West, contributing to a long-standing conversation about the play's representation of the relationship between imperializing western countries and colonised eastern cultures. Despite Octavius Caesar's concluding victory and the absorption of Egypt into Rome, Antony and Cleopatra resists clear-cut alignment with Western values. Indeed, Cleopatra's suicide has been interpreted as suggesting an indomitable quality in Egypt, and reaffirming Eastern culture as a timeless contender to the West. However, particularly in earlier criticism, the narrative trajectory of Rome's triumph and Cleopatra's perceived weakness as a ruler have allowed readings that privilege Shakespeare's representation of a Roman worldview. Octavius Caesar is seen as Shakespeare's portrayal of an ideal governor, though perhaps an unfavourable friend or lover, and Rome is emblematic of reason and political excellence. According to this reading, Egypt is viewed as destructive and vulgar; the critic Paul Lawrence Rose writes: "Shakespeare clearly envisages Egypt as a political hell for the subject, where natural rights count for nothing." Through the lens of such a reading, the ascendancy of Rome over Egypt does not speak to the practice of empire-building as much as it suggests the inevitable advantage of reason over sensuality.

More contemporary scholarship on the play, however, has typically recognised the allure of Egypt for Antony and Cleopatra's audiences. Egypt's magnetism and seeming cultural primacy over Rome have been explained by efforts to contextualise the political implications of the play within its period of production. The various protagonists' ruling styles have been identified with rulers contemporary to Shakespeare. For example, there appears to be continuity between the character of Cleopatra and the historical figure of Queen Elizabeth I, and the unfavourable light cast on Caesar has been explained as deriving from the claims of various 16th-century historians.

The more recent influence of New Historicism and post-colonial studies have yielded readings of Shakespeare that typify the play as subversive, or challenging the status quo of Western imperialism. The critic Abigail Scherer's claim that "Shakespeare's Egypt is a holiday world" recalls the criticisms of Egypt put forth by earlier scholarship and disputes them. Scherer and critics who recognise the wide appeal of Egypt have connected the spectacle and glory of Cleopatra's greatness with the spectacle and glory of the theatre itself. Plays, as breeding grounds of idleness, were subject to attack by all levels of authority in the 1600s; the play's celebration of pleasure and idleness in a subjugated Egypt makes it plausible to draw parallels between Egypt and the heavily censored theatre culture in England. In the context of England's political atmosphere, Shakespeare's representation of Egypt, as the greater source of poetry and imagination, resists support for 16th century colonial practices. Importantly, King James' sanction of the founding of Jamestown occurred within months of Antony and Cleopatra's debut on stage. England during the Renaissance found itself in an analogous position to the early Roman Republic. Shakespeare's audience may have made the connection between England's westward expansion and Antony and Cleopatra's convoluted picture of Roman imperialism. In support of the reading of Shakespeare's play as subversive, it has also been argued that 16th century audiences would have interpreted Antony and Cleopatra's depiction of different models of government as exposing inherent weaknesses in an absolutist, imperial, and by extension monarchical, political state.

===== Empire and intertextuality =====
One of the ways to read the imperialist themes of the play is through a historical, political context with an eye for intertextuality. Many scholars suggest that Shakespeare possessed an extensive knowledge of the story of Antony and Cleopatra through the historian Plutarch, and used Plutarch's account as a blueprint for his own play. A closer look at this intertextual link reveals that Shakespeare used, for instance, Plutarch's assertion that Antony claimed a genealogy that led back to Hercules, and constructed a parallel to Cleopatra by often associating her with Dionysus in his play. The implication of this historical mutability is that Shakespeare is transposing non-Romans upon his Roman characters, and thus his play assumes a political agenda rather than merely committing itself to a historical recreation. Shakespeare deviates from a strictly obedient observation of Plutarch, though, by complicating a simple dominant/dominated dichotomy with formal choices. For instance, the quick exchange of dialogue might suggest a more dynamic political conflict. Furthermore, certain characteristics of the characters, like Antony whose "legs bestrid the ocean" (5.2.82) point to constant change and mutability. Plutarch, on the other hand, was given to "tendencies to stereotype, to polarise, and to exaggerate that are inherent in the propaganda surrounding his subjects."

Furthermore, because of the unlikelihood that Shakespeare would have had direct access to the Greek text of Plutarch's Parallel Lives and probably read it through a French translation from a Latin translation, his play constructs Romans with an anachronistic Christian sensibility that might have been influenced by St. Augustine's Confessions among others. As Miles writes, the ancient world would not have been aware of interiority and the contingence of salvation upon conscience until Augustine. For the Christian world, salvation relied on and belonged to the individual, while the Roman world viewed salvation as political. So, Shakespeare's characters in Antony and Cleopatra, particularly Cleopatra in her belief that her own suicide is an exercise of agency, exhibit a Christian understanding of salvation.

Another example of deviance from the source material is how Shakespeare characterises the rule of Antony and Cleopatra. While Plutarch singles out the "order of exclusive society" that the lovers surrounded themselves with—a society with a specifically defined and clear understanding of the hierarchies of power as determined by birth and status—Shakespeare's play seems more preoccupied with the power dynamics of pleasure as a main theme throughout the play. Once pleasure has become a dynamic of power, then it permeates society and politics. Pleasure serves as a differentiating factor between Cleopatra and Antony, between Egypt and Rome, and can be read as the fatal flaw of the heroes if Antony and Cleopatra is a tragedy. For Shakespeare's Antony and Cleopatra, the exclusivity and superiority supplied by pleasure created the disconnect between the ruler and the subjects. Critics suggest that Shakespeare did similar work with these sources in Othello, Julius Caesar, and Coriolanus.

==== Fortune and chance: politics and nature ====
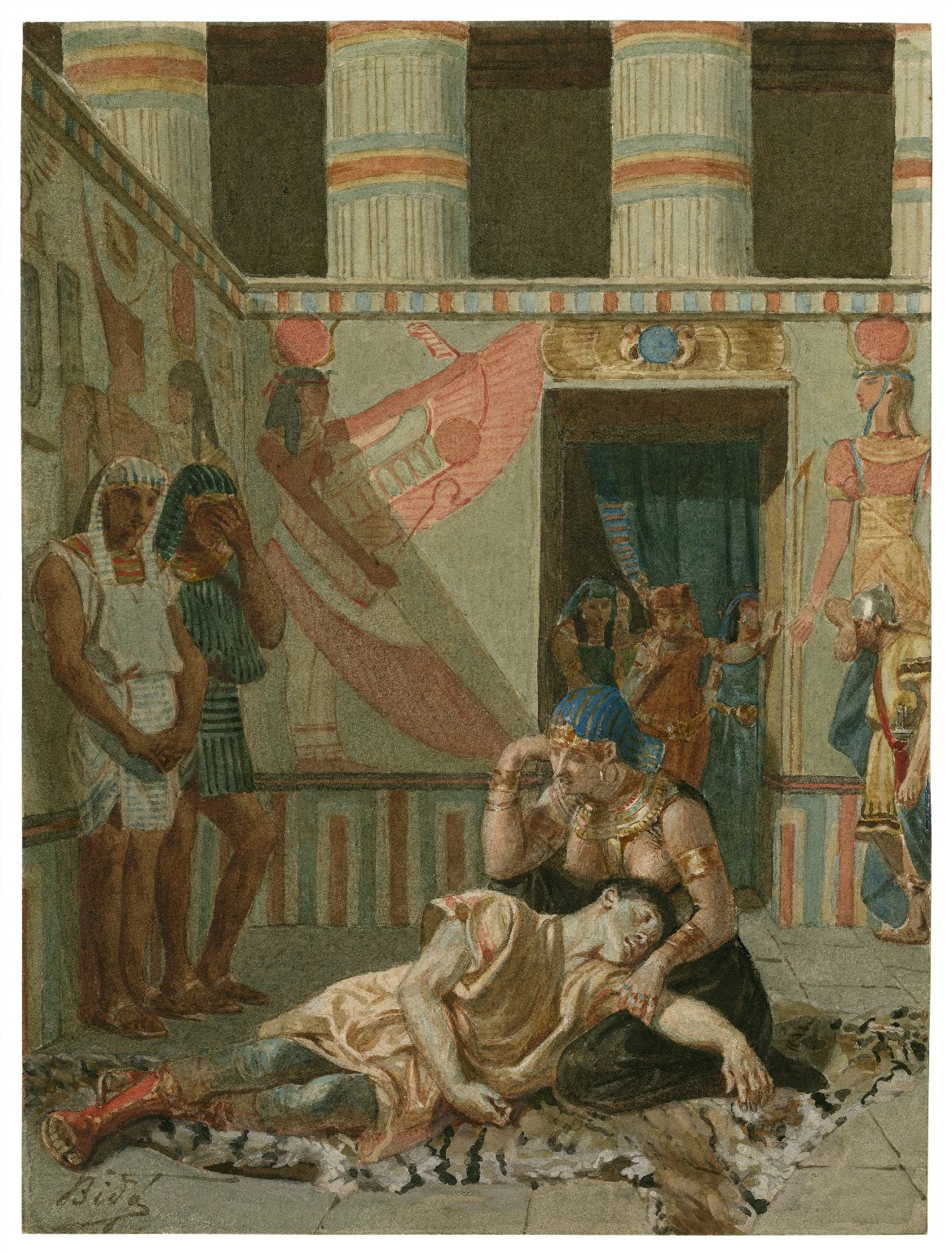
A late 19th-century painting of Act IV, Scene 15: Cleopatra holds Antony as he dies.

The concept of luck, or Fortune, is frequently referenced throughout Antony and Cleopatra, portrayed as an elaborate "game" that the characters participate in. An element of Fate lies within the play's concept of Chance, as the subject of Fortune/Chance's favour at any particular moment becomes the most successful character. Shakespeare represents Fortune through elemental and astronomical imagery that recalls the characters' awareness of the "unreliability of the natural world". This calls into question the extent to which the characters' actions influence the resulting consequences, and whether the characters are subject to the preferences of Fortune or Chance. Antony eventually realises that he, like other characters, is merely "Fortune's knave", a mere card in the game of Chance rather than a player.

This realization suggests that Antony realises that he is powerless in relation to the forces of Chance, or Fortune. The manner in which the characters deal with their luck is of great importance, therefore, as they may destroy their chances of luck by taking advantage of their fortune to excessive lengths without censoring their actions, as Antony did. Scholar Marilyn Williamson notes that the characters may spoil their Fortune by, "riding too high" on it, as Antony did by ignoring his duties in Rome and spending time in Egypt with Cleopatra. While Fortune does play a large role in the characters' lives, they do have ability to exercise free will, however; as Fortune is not as restrictive as Fate. Antony's actions suggest this, as he is able to use his free will to take advantage of his luck by choosing his own actions. Like the natural imagery used to describe Fortune, scholar Michael Lloyd characterises it as an element itself, which causes natural occasional upheaval. This implies that fortune is a force of nature that is greater than mankind, and cannot be manipulated. The 'game of chance' that Fortune puts into play can be related to that of politics, expressing the fact that the characters must play their luck in both fortune and politics to identify a victor. The play culminates, however, in Antony's realization that he is merely a card, not a player in this game.

The motif of "card playing" has a political undertone, as it relates to the nature of political dealings. Caesar and Antony take action against each other as if playing a card game; playing by the rules of Chance, which sways in its preference from time to time. Although Caesar and Antony may play political cards with each other, their successes rely somewhat on Chance, which hints at a certain limit to the control they have over political affairs. Furthermore, the constant references to astronomical bodies and "sublunar" imagery connote a Fate-like quality to the character of Fortune, implying a lack of control on behalf of the characters. Although the characters do exercise free will to a certain extent, their success in regard to their actions ultimately depends on the luck that Fortune bestows upon them. The movement of the "moon" and the "tides" is frequently mentioned throughout the play, such as when Cleopatra states that, upon Antony's death, there is nothing of importance left "beneath the moon." The elemental and astronomical "sublunar" imagery frequently referred to throughout the play is thus intertwined with the political manipulation that each character incites, yet the resulting winner of the political "game" relies in part on Chance, which has a supreme quality that the characters cannot maintain control over, and therefore must submit to.

== Adaptations and cultural references ==
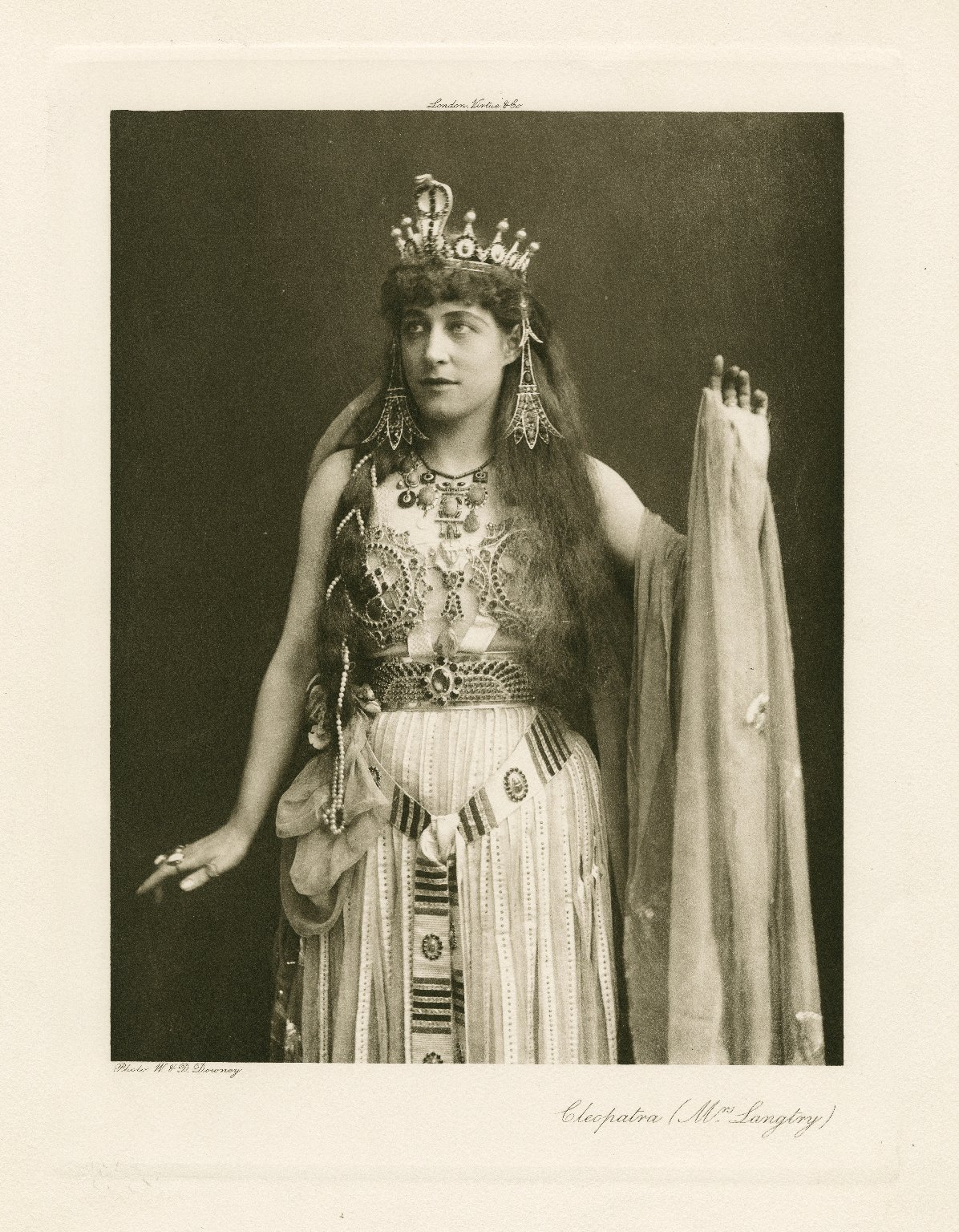
An 1891 photograph of Lillie Langtry as Cleopatra

=== Selected stage productions ===
- 1931, John Gielgud as Antony and Ralph Richardson as Enobarbus at The Old Vic.
- 1947, Katharine Cornell won a Tony Award for her Broadway performance of Cleopatra opposite the Antony of Godfrey Tearle. It ran for 126 performances, the longest run of the play in Broadway history.
- 1951, Laurence Olivier as Antony and Vivien Leigh as Cleopatra in a production that played in repertory with George Bernard Shaw's Caesar and Cleopatra at the St James's Theatre and later on Broadway.
- 1953, Michael Redgrave played Antony and Peggy Ashcroft played Cleopatra at the Shakespeare Memorial Theatre.
- 1972, Janet Suzman and Richard Johnson, with Patrick Stewart as Enobarbus in Trevor Nunn's production for the Royal Shakespeare Company
- 1978, Alan Howard and Glenda Jackson in Peter Brook's production for the Royal Shakespeare Company
- 1981, Timothy Dalton played Antony and Carmen du Sautoy played Cleopatra at the Mermaid Theatre.
- 1982, Michael Gambon played Antony and Helen Mirren played Cleopatra for the Royal Shakespeare Company at The Other Place, and later at The Pit at The Barbican Centre, in a production directed by Adrian Noble.
- 1986, Timothy Dalton and Vanessa Redgrave in the title roles at Theatr Clwyd and Haymarket Theatre.
- 1987, Anthony Hopkins and Judi Dench in the title roles at the Royal National Theatre.
- 1998, Alan Rickman and Helen Mirren in the title roles at the Royal National Theatre, in a production directed by Sean Mathias.
- 1999, Alan Bates and Frances de la Tour in title roles, Guy Henry as Octavius (also David Oyelowo and Owen Oakeshott) at the Royal Shakespeare Company.
- 1999, Paul Shelley as Antony and Mark Rylance as Cleopatra in an all-male cast production at Shakespeare's Globe Theatre in London.
- 2006, Patrick Stewart and Harriet Walter in the title roles at the Royal Shakespeare Company.
- 2010, Kim Cattrall and Jeffery Kissoon in the title roles at the Liverpool Playhouse.
- 2010, Kate Mulgrew and John Douglas Thompson in a production directed by Tina Landau at Hartford Stage.
- 2010, Kathryn Hunter and Darrell D'Silva in the title roles at the Royal Shakespeare Company.
- 2014, Eve Best and Clive Wood in the title roles at Shakespeare's Globe in London. Phil Daniels as Enobarbus.
- 2017, Josette Simon and Antony Byrne in the title roles for the Royal Shakespeare Company's at the Royal Shakespeare Theatre.
- 2018, Johnny Carr and Catherine McClements in the title roles for the Bell Shakespeare company at Sydney Opera House.
- 2018, Ralph Fiennes and Sophie Okonedo in the title roles at the Royal National Theatre in London.
- 2024, John Hollingworth and Nadia Nadarajah in the title roles at Shakespeare's Globe in London.

=== Sound recordings ===
- 1962, Richard Johnson and Irene Worth in the title roles for the Marlowe Society
- 1963, Anthony Quayle and Pamela Brown in the title roles for Caedmon Records

=== Stage adaptations ===
- John Fletcher and Philip Massinger's The False One (c.1620) was influenced by and acts as a prequel to Shakespeare's play.
- John Dryden's play All for Love (1677) was deeply influenced by Shakespeare's treatment of the subject.
- In 1813, John Philip Kemble merged Antony and Cleopatra and All for Love into one play, under the name of the former.

=== Musical adaptations ===
- Ethel Smyth's Overture to Antony and Cleopatra was first performed at London's Crystal Palace on 18 October 1890.
- Samuel Barber's operatic version of the play was premièred in 1966.
- John Adams' operatic version of the play was premièred in 2022.

=== Dance adaptations ===
- Gregory Hancock Dance Theatre's Antony and Cleopatra was performed in Carmel, Indiana in June, 2022. A contemporary retelling, it set the story in two rival nightclubs, with gender fluid characters. Choreography was created by Artistic Director Gregory Hancock and the original score was composed by Cory Gabel.

== See also ==
- Romeo and Juliet
- Tristan and Iseult
- Pyramus and Thisbe
- The Cowherd and the Weaver Girl
