= Tzachi Zamir =

Israeli ethicist and literary critic (born 1967)

- צחי זמיר
- Born: 1967 (age 58–59)

Education
- Education: Tel Aviv University; Hebrew University of Jerusalem

Tzachi Zamir (Hebrew: צחי זמיר; born February 13, 1967) is an Israeli philosopher and literary critic specialising in the philosophy of literature, the philosophy of theatre, and animal ethics. He is Professor of English and General & Comparative Literature at the Hebrew University of Jerusalem.

== Academic career ==
Zamir studied at the Hebrew University of Jerusalem and Tel-Aviv University, going on to be a Rothschild and Fulbright postdoctoral fellow in philosophy at The University of Chicago. He joined the English department of the Hebrew University of Jerusalem in 2004 as a lecturer, and is now Professor of English and General & Comparative Literature.

Zamir is the author of the 2006 book Double Vision: Moral Philosophy and Shakespearean Drama and the 2007 book Ethics & the Beast: A Speciesist Argument for Animal Liberation, both published by Princeton University Press. His 2014 book Acts: Theater, Philosophy, and the Performing Self was published by the University of Michigan Press. In 2018, he published both the monograph Ascent: Philosophy and Paradise Lost and the edited collection Shakespeare's Hamlet: Philosophical Perspectives with Oxford University Press, and in 2020 he published Just Literature: Philosophical Criticism and Justice with Routledge.

While most contemporary scholars involved with animal ethics have written in favour of veganism, Zamir however has defended vegetarianism.

== Selected publications ==
- Zamir, Tzachi (1999). Ways of saying : an inquiry into types of relationships between philosophy and literature (PhD thesis). Tel Aviv: Tel Aviv University.
- "Veganism" (Journal of Social Philosophy, 2004)
- Double Vision: Moral Philosophy and Shakespearean Drama (Princeton University Press, 2006)
- Ethics & the Beast: A Speciesist Argument for Animal Liberation (Princeton University Press, 2007)
- "Killing for Pleasure" (Between the Species, 2011)
- Acts: Theater, Philosophy, and the Performing Self (University of Michigan Press, 2014)
- Ascent: Philosophy and Paradise Lost (Oxford University Press, 2018)
- Just Literature: Philosophical Criticism and Justice (Routledge, 2020)
