= David Quint =

American literary historian

David Louis Quint is an American literary scholar and educator. He is a Sterling Professor of English and Comparative Literature at Yale University. His work focuses on Renaissance literature in English, Italian, French, and Spanish, as well as its classical sources in Greek and Latin and its influence on later literary traditions.

== Academic career ==
Quint specializes in Renaissance literature and epic poetry, with work on the transmission of classical traditions into early modern European literature.

At Yale University, he holds a senior professorship in English and Comparative Literature, where he teaches courses on Renaissance literature and literary theory.

== Research interests ==
His research focuses on Renaissance literature, classical sources in Greek and Latin, and epic narrative form, with particular attention to literary theory and genre development.

== Selected works ==
Quint is the author of several influential scholarly books, including:

- Origin and Originality in Renaissance Literature (1983)
- Epic and Empire (1993)
- Montaigne and the Quality of Mercy (1998)
- Cervantes’ Novel of Modern Times: A New Reading of Don Quijote (2003)

He is also the translator of important Renaissance works, including:

- The Stanze of Angelo Poliziano (1979)
- Ariosto’s Cinque Canti (1996)

== Recognition ==
In 2008, he was appointed Sterling Professor of English at Yale University.
