= The Aesthetic Mind =

2011 book by Peter Goldie and Elisabeth Schellekens

The Aesthetic Mind: Philosophy and Psychology
- First edition
- Authors: Peter Goldie, Elisabeth Schellekens
- Language: English
- Subject: aesthetics
- Publisher: Oxford University Press
- Publication date: 2011
- Media type: Print (Paperback)
- Pages: 470 pp.
- ISBN: 9780198705925

The Aesthetic Mind: Philosophy and Psychology is a 2011 book edited by Elisabeth Schellekens and Peter Goldie. The contributors try to provide a new understanding of aesthetics and the experience of art based on philosophical reflections and evidence from empirical sciences.

== Contributors ==
- Noël Carroll
- Zanna Clay
- Roddy Cowie
- Gregory Currie
- David Davies
- Stephen Davies
- Norman H. Freeman
- Roman Frigg
- Peter Goldie
- Catherine Howard
- Marco Iacoboni
- Matthew Kierands
- Peter Lamarque
- Robert H. Layton
- Jerrold Levinson
- Derek Matravers
- I. C. McManus
- Aaron Meskin
- David Miall
- Margaret Moore
- Jesse Prinz
- Lena Quinto
- Mark Rollins
- Edmund Rolls
- Elisabeth Schellekens
- Dorothy Singer
- Jerome L. Singer
- Kathleen Stock
- William Forde Thompson
- Jonathan Weinberg
- Dahlia W. Zaidel
