= Philosophy and Conceptual Art =

2007 book by Peter Goldie and Elisabeth Schellekens

- Authors: Peter Goldie, Elisabeth Schellekens
- Language: English
- Subject: aesthetics
- Publisher: Oxford University Press
- Publication date: 2007
- Media type: Print (Paperback)
- Pages: 312 pp.
- ISBN: 9780199568253

Philosophy and Conceptual Art is a 2007 book edited by Elisabeth Schellekens and Peter Goldie. The contributors deal with the philosophical questions raised by conceptual art.

== Contributors ==
- Margaret Boden
- Diarmuid Costello
- Gregory Currie
- David Davies
- Peter Goldie
- Robert Hopkins
- Matthew Kieran
- Peter Lamarque
- Dominic McIver Lopes
- Derek Matravers
- Elisabeth Schellekens
- Kathleen Stock
- Carolyn Wilde
- Art & Language group
