= Donnellan Lectures =

The Donnellan Lectures are a lecture series at Trinity College Dublin, instituted in 1794. The lectures were originally given under the auspices of the School of Hebrew, Biblical and Theological Studies. But since 1987 they have been run on a triennial basis by the Department of Philosophy and are no longer theological in nature. They were endowed from the estate of Anne Donnellan.

== Lecturers (incomplete list) ==
- 1794 Thomas Elrington The Proof of Christianity… from the Miracles recorded in the New Testament
- 1797, 1801. Richard Graves The Divine Origin of the Jewish Religion proved from the… Last Four Books of the Pentateuch
- 1807. Bartholomew Lloyd
- 1809 Richard Herbert Nash
- 1815–16. Franc Sadleir The Various Degrees of Religious Information Vouchsafed to Mankind
- 1817. [Daniel Mooney D.D.]
- 1818. William Phelan Christianity provides… Correctives for… Tendencies to Polytheism and Idolatry
- 1821, 1824. J. Kennedy The Researches of Modern Science… demonstrate the Inspiration of… Scripture
- 1823 Franc Sadleir The Formulas of the Church of England Conformable to the Scriptures
- 1838 James Henthorn Todd The Prophecies Relating to Antichrist in… Daniel and St. Paul
- 1839 James Henthorn Todd The Prophecies Relating to Antichrist in the Apocalypse of St. John
- 1851 Mortimer O'Sullivan The Hour of the Redeemer
- 1852 William Lee Inspiration of the Holy Scriptures
- 1853 W. de Burgh The Early Prophecies of a Redeemer
- 1854 Charles Parsons Reichel The Nature and Offices of the Church
- 1855 James Byrne Naturalism and Spiritualism
- 1855–56, 1859 J. MacIvor Religious Progress
- 1857 John Cotter MacDonnell The Doctrine of the Atonement deduced from Scripture
- 1858. J. Wills The Antecedent Probability of the Christian Religion
- 1860 Atkins Pastoral Duties
- 1861 W. P Walsh Christian Missions
- 1862 W. de Burgh Messianic Prophecies of Isaiah
- 1865 Ryder The Scripture Doctrine of Acceptance with God
- 1877 John Hewitt Jellett The efficacy of prayer
- 1878–9 George Alexander Chadwick Christ bearing witness to himself
- 1880–1 Charles H. H. Wright The Book of Koheleth, Commonly Called Ecclesiastes, Considered in Relation to Modern Criticism, and to the Doctrines of Modern Pessimism
- 1885–5 Mortimer O'Sullivan The Gospel in the Miracles of Christ, Man's Knowledge of Man and of God
- 1887–8 William Lefroy The Christian Ministry: Its Origin, Constitution, Nature and Work
- 1888–9 J. H. Kennedy Natural Theology and Modern Thought
- 1889–90 Thomas Sterling Berry, DD Christianity and Buddhism : a comparison and a contrast
- 1890 Frederick Falkiner Carmichael, LLD
- 1891 Thomas Lucas Scott, MA
- 1892 William Malcolm Foley, BD
- 1893 Henry Francis John Martin, MA
- 1894 Lewen Burton Weldon, DD
- 1896 John Henry Bernard, DD
- 1899 Charles Frederick D'Arcy Idealism and theology: a study of presuppositions

=== 1900–2026 ===
- 1900–1 G. R. Wynne The Church in Greater Britain
- 1901–2 James Owen Hannay (ps. George A. Birmingham) Spirit and Origin of Christian Monasticism
- 1903–4 Rev. Frederick W. Macran
- 1906–7 H. J. Dunkinfield Astley Prehistoric Archaeology and The Old Testament
- 1911–2 Everard Digges La Touche The Person of Christ in Modern Thought
- 1913–4 Charles Frederick D'Arcy God and Freedom in Human Experience
- W. Boyd Carpenter The Witness of Religious Experience
- Reginald Ingram Montgomery Hitchcock
- 1920 Joseph Armitage Robinson Barnabas, Hermas and the Didache
- 1921 A. A. Luce Bergson's Doctrine of Intuition
- 1922 Viscount Haldane
- 1923 Reginald Arthur Percy Rogers
- 1924 F. C. Burkitt The Religion of the Manichees
- 1929 C. D. Broad
- 1930 John Scott Haldane The philosophical basis of biology
- 1931 Arthur Darby Nock
- 1936 H. Laski
- 1937 Arthur Salter
- 1938 Robin Flower
- 1943 Edward John Moreton Drax Plunkett, Baron Dunsany
- 1944 T. E. Jessop
- 1945 Robert Ditchburn
- 1946 E. T. Whittaker Space and Spirit
- 1948 H. H. Price
- 1952 W. T. Stace
- 1954 H. Frankel
- 1989 Jerry Fodor
- 1992 Martha Nussbaum
- 1995 Richard Sorabji
- 1998 Richard Rorty
- 2002 Stanley Cavell
- 2005 Jonathan Lear
- 2008 Robert Pippin
- 2014 David Chalmers
- 2017 Susan Wolf
- 2020 Linda Zagzebski (delivery postponed to 2022 due to the COVID-19 pandemic)
- 2026 Ruth Chang Hard Choices in Life, Law, and LLMs
