= Alan R. White =

Canadian analytic philosopher (1922–1992)

- Born: Alan Richard White; 9 October 1922; Toronto, Ontario, Canada
- Died: 23 February 1992 (aged 69); Sherwood, Nottingham, England
- Education: Trinity College Dublin (B.A., 1945); University of London (PhD, 1958)
- Occupation: Philosopher
- Spouse(s): Eileen Anne Jarvis (1948–1977); Enid Elizabeth Alderson (1979–)

Alan Richard White (9 October 1922 – 23 February 1992) was a Canadian analytic philosopher who worked mainly in epistemology, the philosophy of mind, and, latterly, legal philosophy.

Peter Hacker notes that he was "the most skillful developer of Rylean ... ideas in philosophical psychology" and that "if anyone surpassed Austin in subtlety and refinement in the discrimination of grammatical differences, it was White." Richard Swinburne remarks that "during the heyday of 'ordinary language philosophy' no tongue practised it better."

== Early life and education ==
Alan R. White (as he was usually cited) was born in Toronto on 9 October 1922, the elder of two sons born to Irish emigrants George Albert White (1888–1940), an estate agent from Strabane, and Jean Gabriel (Kingston) White (1888–1957). Following their parents' separation in the early 1930s, both brothers moved with their Catholic mother when she returned to her hometown of Cork (where she would work in the drapery trade). There they would be educated in the Protestant faith of their father as boarders at Middleton College until the sixth form. White then transferred to (the Catholic) Presentation College, Cork, to prepare for entrance to Trinity College, Dublin. Despite his religious schooling, within only a few years White would become, as academic colleague Paul Gilbert notes, "a keen atheist."

White was admitted to Trinity in 1941 with a junior exhibition and a sizarship in classics. During his time there he served as president of the University Philosophical Society. He graduated in 1945 with firsts in both classics and 'mental and moral science' (philosophy) . He is said. reports David J. Matheson, to have scored over 100 per cent in some of his exams by taking them in Irish, for which extra credit was given. Other achievements during his time as an undergraduate included prizes for Hegelian philosophy and flyweight.boxing. That he was also "pugnacious" outside the ring is attested to by Trinity philosopher A. A. Luce who records that the two had "many a battle" when White was a student in his class.

Also through this time, which coincided with "The Emergency" of World War II, White served with the Local Defence Force in the 42nd Dublin Rifle Battalion. After graduation he remained at Trinity for a year to pursue further studies in classics and serve as a deputy lecturer in logic.

== Career ==
In 1946 White was appointed as an assistant lecturer in the department of philosophy and psychology at the (then) University College of Hull, the departmental staff initially consisting solely of himself and Professor T. E. Jessop. White obtained this position on the recommendation of Luce who had contributed the "Inventory of the Manuscript Remains" to Jessop's A Bibliography of George Berkeley (1934).

Prior to his arrival, Jessop had performed all the teaching duties for both philosophy and psychology. And though Hull's first dedicated psychology lecturer, George Westby, was appointed around the same time as White, the latter would himself also teach psychology as well as philosophy students long after the college acquired university status in 1954 and two separate departments were formed. Ullin Place records that, with the "connivance" of White, Westby. a fellow Rylean, succeeded in making Hull's psychology department "a center for a distinctive amalgam of ordinary language philosophy and behavioral psychology" in its early years. And Westby himself records White's "invaluable co-operation" in initiating and running the three-year "Philosophical Problems of the Sciences" course. The same having been intended to ensure psychology students appreciated "it is impossible to have a purely technical scientific language," a thorough examination of 'Mental' concepts being, as White notes, a necessary preparation "even for those whose chief interest is in the science of psychology."

Within the philosophy department, White progressed to the positions of Lecturer and then Senior Lecturer, succeeding Jessop to become the second Ferens Professor of Philosophy in 1961 (a post he retained until his early retirement in 1985). At Hull he would also serve as dean of arts (1969–71) and as pro-vice-chancellor (1976–79).

In 1958 White completed his PhD at the University of London under the supervision of A.J. Ayer, with a thesis on "The Method of Analysis In the Philosophy of G. E. Moore." That same year would see the publication of the fruits of this research in his first book G.E. Moore: a Critical Exposition.

White was a visiting professor at numerous American universities including the University of Maryland (1967–68, 1980), Temple University (1974), Simon Fraser University (1983), the University of Delaware (1986) and Bowling Green State University (1988). He also became known to the first generation of 'third year' students of philosophy at the Open University, participating in a BBC televised discussion on perception that was annually repeated as part of the 'A303, Problems of philosophy' correspondence course which ran from 1973 until 1981.

He also served as secretary, and then president (1972), of the Mind Association and as president of the Aristotelian Society 1979–1980.

White retired to Nottingham, and was as appointed Special Professor of Philosophy at the university there in 1986.

In the last decade of his life, as Hacker notes, White worked on jurisprudential problems pertaining to action, intention, voluntariness, negligence and recklessness.

He died at his home in Sherwood, Nottingham on 23 February 1992.

== Legacy ==
White's papers, previously held in the Brynmor Jones Library, are now housed at the Hull History Centre.

White, as "a small man, dressed in a dark blue jacket and grey slacks, with a light blue shirt and a bow tie" who "speaks with a slight Irish accent" features (along with Peter Strawson) as a participant in a fictive 2014 philosophical dialogue by P. M. S. Hacker.

A volume of White's selected papers, as edited by Constantine Sandis (who credits White's Grounds of Liability as "a huge influence") with John Preston and David Dolby is, as of 2025, still forthcoming.

== Works ==
=== Authored books/monographs ===
- G.E. Moore: a Critical Exposition, Oxford: Blackwell (1958)
- Explaining Human Behaviour: An Inaugural Lecture Delivered in the University of Hull on 24 January 1962 (1962).
- Attention, Oxford: Blackwell (1964)
- The Philosophy of Mind, New York: Random House (1967)
- Truth, London: Macmillan (1970)
- Modal Thinking, Ithaca: Cornell University Press (1975)
- The Nature of Knowledge, Totowa, Rowman & Littlefield (1982)
- Rights, Oxford: Clarendon-Press (1984)
- Grounds of Liability: An Introduction to the Philosophy of Law, Oxford: Oxford University Press (1985)
- Methods of Metaphysics, London: Routledge & Kegan Paul (1987)
- The Language of Imagination (1990)
- Misleading Cases, Oxford: Clarendon Press (1991)

=== Edited books ===
- The Philosophy of Action, Oxford: Oxford University Press, 1967 (Includes Introduction by White).

=== Papers/book chapters ===
==== 1950s ====
- "Conscience and Self-Love in Butler's Sermons" Philosophy, 27, No. 103. (Oct., 1952), pp. 329–344.
- "Mr. Hartnack on Experience" Analysis, 14, No. 1. (Oct., 1953), p. 26.
- "A Note on Meaning and Verification" Mind, New Series, 63, No. 249 (Jan., 1954), pp. 66–69
- "The Ambiguity of Berkeley's 'Without the Mind'" Hermathena, 83, 1954, pp. 55–65. JSTOR 23039319
- "Mr Hampshire and Professor Ryle on dispositions" Analysis, April 1954; 14: 111–113
- "Professor A.D Ritchie on empirical problems" Analysis, October 1955; 16: 14
- "A Linguistic Approach to Berkeley's Philosophy" Philosophy and Phenomenological Research, 16, No. 2 (Dec., 1955), pp. 172–187
- "The use of sentences" Analysis. October 1956; 17: 1–4
- "On Claiming to Know" The Philosophical Review, 66, No. 2 (Apr., 1957), pp. 180–192. (Reprinted in A. Phillips Griffiths (ed.), Knowledge and Belief, pp 100–111 (Oxford: Oxford University Press, 1967).
- "Truth as Appraisal" Mind, New Series, 66, No. 263 (Jul., 1957), pp. 318–330
- "Contrary-to-fact conditionals and logical impossibility" Analysis, October 1957; 18: 14–16
- "The Language of Motives" Mind, New Series, 67, No. 266. (Apr., 1958), pp. 258–263.
- "Moore on a Tautology" Philosophical Studies, vol. 9, no. 1/2, (Jan.–Feb., 1958), pp. 1–4.
- "Moore's appeal to Common Sense", Philosophy, Vol. 33, No. 126 (Jul., 1958), pp. 221–239
- "Synonymous Expressions" The Philosophical Quarterly, vol. 8, no. 32, 1958, pp. 193–207.
- "Belief Sentences" Mind, vol. 67, no. 268, 1958, pp. 527–532.
- "Keeping" Mind, vol. 68, no. 272, Oct., 1959, pp. 545–547.
- "The 'meaning' of Russell's theory of descriptions" Analysis, October 1959; 20: 8–9

==== 1960s ====
- "Different kinds of heed concepts", Analysis,. April 1960; 20: 112–116
- "G. E. Moore" in J. O. Urmson (ed.), The Concise Encyclopedia of Western Philosophy (London: Hutchinson, 1960). pp. 273–75.
- "The Concept of Care" The Philosophical Quarterly, Volume 10, Issue 40, July 1960, pp. 271–274,
- "Inclination" Analysis, December 1960; 21: 40–42
- "Thinking that and Knowing that",The Philosophical Quarterly, Volume 11, Issue 42, January 1961, pp. 68–73,
- ."Meaning, Intentionality and Use" in: Atti del XII Congresso Internazionale di Filosofia (Venezia, 12–18 Settembre 1958) Vol. 4: pp. 377–384 (1961)
- "Symposium: The Causal Theory of Perception" (with H. P. Grice), Proceedings of the Aristotelian Society, Supplementary Volumes, Vol. 35 (1961), pp. 121–168. (Reprinted in G. J. Warnock (ed.), The Philosophy of Perception, (Oxford: Oxford University Press, 1967)).
- "Carelessness, Indifference and Recklessness" The Modern Law Review. 24 (5): 592–595. (September 1961)
- "Attending and Noticing" Proceedings of the Aristotelian Society, vol. 63, 1962, pp. 103–126
- "Carelessness and Recklessness. A Rejoinder" The Modern Law Review, 25, No. 4 (Jul., 1962), pp. 437–441
- "Achilles at the Shooting Gallery" Mind, New Series, 72, No. 285 (Jan., 1963), pp. 141–142 JSTOR 2251934
- "The alleged ambiguity of 'see'" Analysis,. October 1963; 24: 1–5 JSTOR 3326671
- "The Notion of Interest" The Philosophical Quarterly, 14, No. 57 (Oct., 1964), pp. 319–327
- "G. E. Moore" in D. J. O'Connor (ed.), A Critical History of Western Philosophy (Glencoe: Free Press, 1964), pp. 463–472.
- "Mentioning The Unmentionable" Analysis, March 1967; 27: 113–118 (Reprinted in K. T. Fann (ed.), A Symposium on J. L. Austin, (London: Routledge & Kegan Paul, 1969)
- "Negligence," in J. Macquarrie (ed.), A Dictionary of Christian Ethics, (London: SCM Press, 1968), pp.226-7.
- "The coherence theory of truth" In The Encyclopedia of Philosophy (ed. Paul Edwards), London: Collier-Macmillan.1967 (reprinted in Truth).
- '"True" and "Truly"' Nous 2, No. 3 (Aug., 1968), pp. 247–251
- "On Being Obliged to Act" In (ed.) G.N.A. Vesey, The Human Agent, Royal Institute of Philosophy Lectures Volume 1, 1966–7, pp. 64–82 (Macmillan: 1968).
- "Seeing What is not There" In Proceedings of the Aristotelian Society, 70, 1969/70, pp. 61–74.

==== 1970s ====
- "What Might Have Been" in: Studies in the Theory of Knowledge, American Philosophical Quarterly Monograph Series, No. 4. ed. Nicholas Rescher, Basil Blackwell, 1970
- "Inference" The Philosophical Quarterly, 21, No. 85 (Oct., 1971), pp. 289–302
- "Meaning and Implication" Analysis, 32, No. 1. (Oct., 1971), pp. 26–30.
- "The Propensity Theory of Probability" The British Journal for the Philosophy of Science, 23, No. 1 (Feb., 1972), pp. 35–43
- "Mind-Brain Analogies" Canadian Journal-of-Philosophy. June 1972; 1: 457–472
- "What we Believe" in: Studies in the Philosophy of Mind, American Philosophical Quarterly Monograph Series no. 6, N. Rescher (ed.), Basil Blackwell. 1972; 6: 69–84
- "The Inaugural Address: Certainty". Proceedings of the Aristotelian Society, Supplementary Volumes. 46: (1972), pp. 1–18
- "Responsibility, Liability, Excuses and Blame" Studi Internazionali di Filosofia, 5, 1973
- "Can What is Known and What is Believed be the Same?" Hermathena, 118, 1974, 139–146
- "Chairman's Remarks" in: Stuart C. Brown (ed.), Philosophy of Psychology, (London: Macmillan, 1974), pp. 325–330
- "Needs and wants" Proceedings of the Philosophy of Education Society of Great Britain. July 1974; 8: 159–180
- "Trade Descriptions about the Future" Law Quarterly Review, 90, 1974, 15–20.
- "Conceptual Analysis" In (eds. Charles. J. Bontempo and S. Jack Odell), The Owl of Minerva, New York : McGraw-Hill, 1975, pp. 103–117.
- "Intention, Purpose, Foresight, and Desire" Law Quarterly Review, 92, 1976, pp. 569–590.
- "Knowledge Without Conviction" Mind, New Series, 86, Issue 342, April 1977, pp. 224–236, collected in The Philosopher's Annual, Vol. 1 (1978) pp. 172–184
- "The Identity and time of the Actus Reus" Criminal Law Review 48, 1977
- "Dewey's Theory of Interest" in .Peters, R. S., (ed.), John Dewey Reconsidered, (London: Routledge & Kegan Paul, 1977)
- "Privilege" The Modern Law Review, 41, No. 3 (May, 1978), pp. 299–311
- "Acquiring and possessing knowledge" Analysis, June 1978; 38: 129–131
- "Austin as philosophical analyst" Archiv für Rechts- und Sozialphilosophie. 1978; 64: 379–399
- "Propositions and Sentences" pp. 22–33., "Belief as a Propositional Attitude" pp. 242–252., in G. W. Roberts (ed.), Bertrand Russell Memorial Volume, (Allen & Unwin, 1979),
- "The Presidential Address: Shooting, killing, and fatally wounding" Proceedings of the Aristotelian Society, 80, 1979–80, pp. 1–15.

==== 1980s/1990s ====
- "Knowledge, Acquaintance, and Awareness" In Peter A. French, Theodore E. Uehling Jr., and Howard K. Wettstein (eds.), Midwest Studies in Philosophy, Volume VI: The Foundations of Analytic Philosophy (Minneapolis: University of Minnesota Press, 1981), pp. 159–172.
- "An intentional fallacy in epistemology" Canadian Journal of Philosophy. September 1981; 11: 539–545
- "Rights and claims" (pp. 315–336) and "[Rights, Claims and Remedies]: Reply to Professor MacCormick" (pp. 359–366) Law and Philosophy, 1, No. 2, Selection from the Proceedings of the Royal Institute of Philosophy Conference on the Philosophy of Law September 1979. (Aug., 1982),. Reprinted ([with concluding remarks] in ed. M.A. Stewart), Law, Morality, and Rights. Reidel: Dordrecht, 1983, pp. 139–60 & 189–98.
- "Doubting one's methods" Analysis. June 1983; 43: 133–134
- "Fact in the Law" in: W. L. Twining (ed.) Facts in Law (Wiesbaden, 1983) 108–119 OCLC 731454038 ISBN 3515038973, 978-3515038973
- "Ways of speaking of imagination" Analysis. June 1986; 46: 152–156
- "Common sense: Moore and Wittgenstein" Revue-Internationale-de-Philosophie. 1986; 40: 313–330
- "Do claims imply rights?" Law-and-Philosophy. December 1986; 5: 417–420
- "Visualising and Imagining Seeing" Analysis, October 1987; 47: 221–224
- '"By" and "By"' Analysis, 47, No. 4. (Oct., 1987): 239–240.
- "Discussions: 'Eine Vorstellung ist kein Bild'” Philosophical Investigations, Vol. 11, Issue 2, April 1988, pp.151–155.
- "Imagining and Pretending" Philosophical Investigations, Vol. 11, Issue 4, October 1988, pp.300–314.
- "As I remember…" The Philosophical Quarterly, Volume 39, Issue 154, January 1989, pp.94–97
- "Imaginary Imagining", Analysis, March 1989; 49: pp.81–83
- "Attempting the impossible". In R. Frey & C. Morris (Eds.), Liability and Responsibility: Essays in Law and Morals. Cambridge Studies in Philosophy and Law, pp.65–86. Cambridge: Cambridge University Press. 1991 ISBN 9780521392167
- "Suspicion" In: J. V. Canfield & S. G. Shanker (eds.), Wittgenstein's Intentions, (New York: Garland, 1992/3), pp. 81–86. ISBN 9781138775435

A listing of White's publications that includes book reviews can be found at PhilPapers.
