= Contemporary Debates in Aesthetics and the Philosophy of Art =

2005 book edited by Matthew Kieran

- Editors: Matthew Kieran
- Language: English
- Subject: philosophy of art
- Publisher: Blackwell Publishing
- Publication date: 2005
- Media type: Print (Hardcover)
- Pages: 384 pp.
- ISBN: 1405102403

Contemporary Debates in Aesthetics and the Philosophy of Art is a 2005 book edited by Matthew Kieran in which pairs of authors dispute central topics in philosophy of art.

== Reception ==
Jenefer Robinson calls it "a very good book".
