= Elisabeth Schellekens =

Swedish philosopher

Education
- Education: King's College London (PhD); University of Edinburgh (MA)
- Thesis: A Reasonable Objectivism for Aesthetic Judgments: Towards An Aesthetic Psychology (2003)
- Doctoral advisor: Peter Goldie

Philosophical work
- Era: 21st-century philosophy
- Region: Western philosophy
- Institutions: Uppsala University
- Main interests: aesthetics, moral psychology, Kant
- Website: https://katalog.uu.se/profile/?id=N13-2457

Elisabeth Schellekens is a Swedish philosopher and Chair Professor of Aesthetics at Uppsala University (since 2014). Previously, she was Senior Lecturer at Durham University (2006-2014). Schellekens is known for her works in aesthetics. Her research interests include aesthetic cognitivism and objectivism, aesthetic normativity, Hume, Kant, aesthetic and moral properties, conceptual art, non-perceptual or intelligible aesthetic value, the relations between perception and knowledge, the aesthetics and ethics of cultural heritage (esp. in armed conflict), and the interaction between aesthetic, moral, cognitive and historical value in art.

Schellekens was co-editor of the British Journal of Aesthetics between 2007 and 2019. She continues to serve on the journal's editorial board, and has served on a number of journal editorial boards, including the Journal of Aesthetics and Art Criticism and Estetika.

== Current positions ==
- Chair Professor of Aesthetics, Department of Philosophy, Uppsala University
- Fellow, Royal Society of Arts and Sciences, Uppsala
- Fellow, Royal Society of Humanities, Uppsala University

== Published works ==
=== Authored books ===
- Aesthetics and Morality (Continuum Books, 2007; 2nd edition, Bloomsbury Academic, 2023)
- Who's Afraid of Conceptual Art, with Peter Goldie (Routledge, 2009)

=== Edited collections ===
- Aesthetics: Philosophy and Martin Creed, with David del Sasso (Bloomsbury, 2022)
- The Aesthetic Mind, with Peter Goldie (Oxford University Press, 2011)
- Philosophy and Conceptual Art, with Peter Goldie (Oxford University Press, 2007)
