= List of scholars of Trinity College Dublin =

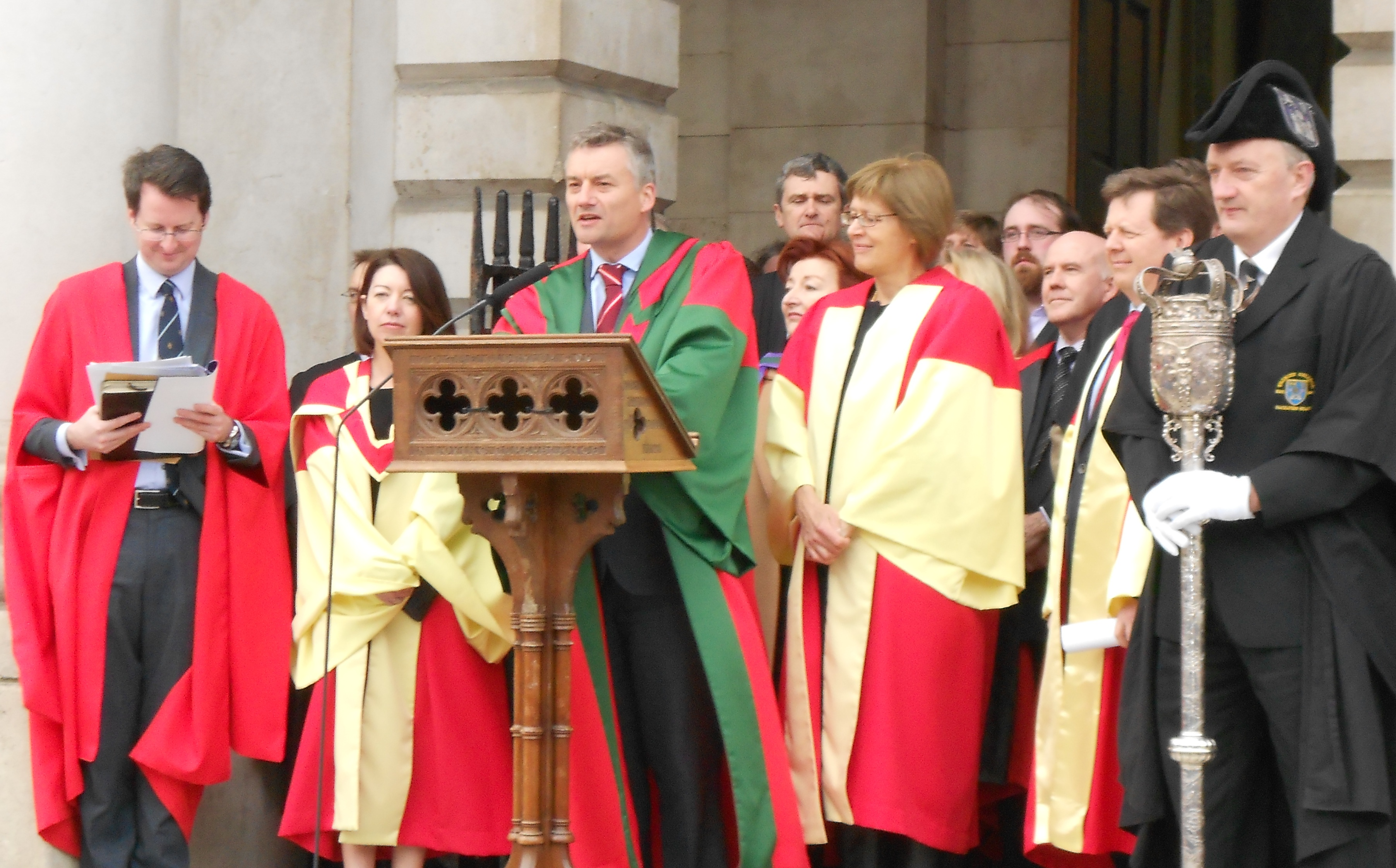
Announcement of new Fellows and Scholars of Trinity College Dublin on Trinity Monday, 2013

This is a list of individuals elected as Scholars of Trinity College Dublin. Described by Trinity College as "the most prestigious undergraduate award in the country", Foundation Scholarship ("Schols") examinations have been held annually at Trinity since its establishment in 1592.

Schols is awarded to those who achieve a first class honours average in a set of challenging voluntary examinations, held in January the week before Hilary term begins, which test a student's ability to "consistently demonstrate exceptional knowledge and understanding of their subjects". Benefits include waived fees, a small salary, rooms in college, dining rights at Commons, Seanad voting privileges and a post-nominal title, "Sch.". Typically, less than 1% of the undergraduate population is awarded the scholarship. The number of Foundation Scholars (also known as Scholars of the House) is limited to 70, however the number of Non-Foundation Scholars can change.

Former scholars include two Nobel Prize winners, one head of state (Mary Robinson), several government ministers, an Academy Award nominee (Lenny Abrahamson), and nine Provosts of Trinity College Dublin itself.

The subject and year of scholarship are included in brackets after each awardee's name below.

== Arts and entertainment ==
- Lenny Abrahamson (Mental and Moral Science, 1988), Oscar-nominated film director.
- Samuel Beckett (Modern Languages, 1926), dramatist and Nobel laureate.
- Jonny Donahoe (English and Anglo-Saxon, 2004), British comedian, writer and performer.
- Jack Gleeson (Philosophy and Theology, 2012), actor best known for Game of Thrones.
- Claire Hennessy (History and English, 2007), writer and editor.
- George Jackson (Music, 2007), conductor.
- Declan Kiberd (Modern Languages and Literature, 1971), writer and academic.
- Caoimhín Ó Raghallaigh (Theoretical Physics, 1999), fiddler.
- Micheal O'Siadhail (Celtic Languages, 1966), Poet.
- Abie Philbin Bowman (History and English, 2002), comedian and journalist.
- Matthew Pilkington (Classics, 1721), satirist and art historian.
- Norman Rodway (Classics, 1948), actor.
- Sally Rooney (English, 2011), novelist.
- James White (Classics, 1778), historical novelist.

== Broadcasting and journalism ==
- James David Bourchier (Classics, 1871), Balkans correspondent for The Times, advisor to Tzar Ferdinand of Bulgaria.
- Douglas Gageby (Modern Languages, 1940), editor of The Irish Times.
- Mary Mulvihill (Natural Sciences, 1979), science journalist and broadcaster.
- Helen Joyce (Mathematics, 1989), finance editor and international editor of The Economist.

== Economics and public policy ==
- George Alexander Duncan (Classics, 1920), economist and Pro-Chancellor of the University of Dublin.
- Francis Ysidro Edgeworth (1865), economist who made significant contributions to the methods of statistics and founding editor of The Economic Journal.
- W. M. Gorman (Mathematics, 1943), economist and mathematician. The Gorman Prize, for the highest grades in the MSc in Economics at Trinity, is named in his honour.
- John Kells Ingram (Mathematics, 1840), economist, poet, and mathematician.
- Morgan Kelly (Economic and Social Studies 1982), economist and economic historian. Probably most note-worthy predictor of the Irish economic crisis and the Irish property bubble; he wrote on ECB and Irish Government response to it.
- Philip R. Lane (Economics and Social Studies, 1989), Chief Economist of the European Central Bank. Previously Governor of the Central Bank of Ireland and former holder of the Whately Chair of Political Economy.
- Michael McMahon (Economics and Social Studies, 1998), Professor of Economics at Oxford University and Fellow of St. Hugh's College.
- Kevin O'Rourke (Economics and Mathematics, 1982), economic historian, Professor of Economics at NYU Abu Dhabi and former Chichele Professor of Economic History, All Souls College, Oxford.

== Education ==
- Richard Stack (died 1812), an Irish author

== Humanities and political science ==
- James Auchmuty (Modern History and Political Science, 1929), historian, wartime MI6 propagandist, inaugural vice-chancellor, University of Newcastle, Australia.
- George Berkeley (Classics, 1702), philosopher.
- J. B. Bury (Classics, 1879), Byzantine scholar, Regius Professor of Modern History at Cambridge University and mentor to Steven Runciman.
- Mary Elmes (Modern Literature (French and Spanish), 1931), Irish aid worker that was honoured as Righteous Among the Nations for saving the lives of more than 200 Jewish children during the Second World War. She also won the gold medal at Trinity.
- R. F. Foster (History and Political Science, 1969), historian.
- Edward Hincks (Classics, 1810), Assyriologist and orientalist.
- Norman Jeffares (Classics, 1941), literary scholar.
- Heather Jones (History and English Literature, 1998), World War I expert and Associate Professor of International History, London School of Economics.
- Bartholomew Lloyd (Classics, 1790), classicist, mathematician and Provost of Trinity College Dublin. Father of Humphrey Lloyd, also a scholar and Provost of Trinity.
- George Green Loane (Classics, 1889), classical scholar
- John V. Luce (Classics, 1939), classical scholar.
- F. S. L. Lyons (Modern History and Political Science, 1943), historian and Provost of Trinity College Dublin.
- John Pentland Mahaffy (Classics, 1857), classical scholar and polymath.
- R. B. McDowell (Modern History and Political Science, 1936), historian.
- Vivian Mercier (Modern Languages, 1938), literary critic.
- Annette Jocelyn Otway-Ruthven (Modern History and Political Science, 1929), medieval historian and Lecky Professor of History at Trinity College Dublin, 1951–1981.
- Franc Sadleir (Classics, 1794), Regius Professor of Greek and later Provost of Trinity College Dublin. Advocate for Catholic emancipation.
- Brendan Simms (History, 1986), Professor of the History of International Relations, Cambridge University.
- William Bedell Stanford (Classics, 1929), senator and Regius Professor of Greek, Trinity College Dublin.
- Robert Walsh (Classics, 1794), historian, writer, clergyman and physician.
- Calder Walton, historian and current Ernest May Fellow in History and Policy, Harvard Kennedy School of Government.
- James Whitelaw (Classics, 1769), historian, writer, statistician and philanthropist.
- George Newenham Wright (Classics, 1812), writer and clergyman.

== Law, politics and government ==
- Ernest Alton (Classics, 1894), Irish politician, university professor, and Provost of Trinity College Dublin.
- Francis Blackburne (Classics, 1801), Lord Chancellor of Ireland.
- Roy Bradford (Modern Languages, 1940), Ulster Unionist Party MP.
- Isaac Butt (Classics, 1832), Irish nationalist MP and barrister.
- Declan Budd (Modern History and Political Science, 1964), High Court judge.
- Richard Collins, Baron Collins (Classics, 1861), Anglo-Irish lawyer and judge.
- Conor Cruise O'Brien (Modern Languages, 1937), politician, writer and academic.
- Gerald FitzGibbon (Classics, 1858), renowned Irish barrister and judge.
- William Greatrakes (Classics, 1744), barrister and supposed author of the Letters of Junius, which openly criticised the government of King George III.
- Dodgson Hamilton Madden (1860), Irish Unionist Party MP.
- Denis Caulfield Heron (Classics, 1845), lawyer barred from taking up his scholarship due to his Catholicism.
- Michael Joseph Hogan – Irish lawyer and Chief Justice of Hong Kong
- Sir James Hogg, 1st Baronet (Classics, 1808), Conservative MP, director and chairman of the East India Company.
- Hugh Law (Classics, 1837), Lord Chancellor of Ireland.
- James Anthony Lawson (Classics, 1836), lawyer, judge and Attorney-General for Ireland.
- Brian Lenihan Jnr (Legal Science, 1979), politician and former Minister for Finance during the Irish economic downturn.
- Rory Montgomery (History, 1979), civil servant and former Ambassador of Ireland to France and the European Union.
- Dermot MacDermot (Modern Languages, 1927), former British Ambassador to Indonesia and Thailand, Prince of Coolavin.
- David Norris (English Literature and Language, 1965), senator, gay rights activist and former presidential candidate.
- Louis Perrin (Classics, 1799), Whig MP, barrister and close friend of Robert Emmet.
- Mary Robinson (Legal Science, 1965), former President of Ireland and United Nations High Commissioner for Human Rights.
- Owen Sheehy-Skeffington (Modern Languages, 1929), senator.
- Sir Edward Sullivan, 1st Baronet (Classics, 1843), Irish lawyer and Liberal MP.
- William Thrift (Mathematics, 1890), Irish politician, university professor, and Provost of Trinity College Dublin.
- John Edward Walsh (Classics, 1835), barrister, Conservative MP and Attorney-General for Ireland. Son of Robert Walsh, also a scholar.
- Arthur Wolfe, 1st Viscount Kilwarden (Classics, 1755), politician and Lord Chief Justice of Ireland.

== Mathematics and science ==
- William Allman (Classics, 1795), botanist.
- Robert Stawell Ball (Mathematics, 1859), astronomer.
- John Casey (Mathematics, 1861), mathematician specialising in Euclidean geometry.
- David Conlon (Mathematics, 2001), combinatorist.
- Luke Drury (Mathematics, 1973), astrophysicist.
- Mervyn A. Ellison (Experimental Science, 1930), astronomer and authority on solar flares.
- Adrian Hill (Medicine, 1978), vaccinologist and director of the Jenner Institute.
- Humphrey Lloyd (Classics, 1818), physicist and Provost of Trinity College Dublin. Son of Bartholomew Lloyd, also a scholar and Provost of Trinity.
- Neil O'Connell (Mathematics, 1987), probabilist.
- Jones Quain (Classics, 1814), anatomist.
- Thomas Romney Robinson (Classics, 1808), astronomer and physicist. Awarded his scholarship aged fourteen.
- Robert Henry Scott (Classics, 1853), meteorology and President of the Royal Meteorological Society.
- David J. Simms (Mathematics, 1952), mathematician.
- Thomas David Spearman (Mathematics, 1956), mathematical physicist, TCD pro-chancellor and President of the Royal Irish Academy.
- John Lighton Synge (Mathematics, 1919), mathematician and physicist.
- John Sealy Townsend (Mathematics, 1888), mathematical physicist.
- Anthony Traill (Mathematics, 1858), Provost of Trinity College Dublin.
- Henry Ussher (Classics, 1759), astronomer.
- Ernest Walton (Mathematics, 1924), physicist and Nobel Prize winner.
- William Arthur Watts (Modern Languages, 1950), botanist and Provost of Trinity College Dublin.
- Trevor West (Mathematics, 1958), mathematician and senator.
- Barbara Gertrude Yates (Mathematics, 1940) mathematician.
- Joseph Ó Ruanaidh (Engineering, 1988)

== Religion ==
- Theophilus Bolton (Classics, 1695), Church of Ireland bishop.
- Roger Boyle (Classics, 1638), Church of Ireland bishop.
- William Daniel (Classics, 1594), Church of Ireland archbishop. One of the first appointed scholars.
- Charles D'Arcy (Mathematics, 1880), Church of Ireland Archbishop of Dublin.
- Patrick Delany (Classics, 1704), theologian.
- Thomas Elrington (Classics, 1778), Church of Ireland bishop, theologian, mathematician and Provost of Trinity College Dublin.
- David F. Ford (Classics, 1968), Regius Professor of Divinity, Cambridge University.
- Stanley Gower (Classics, 1621), puritan minister and member of the Westminster Divines.
- Charles Graves (Classics, 1832), Church of Ireland bishop, president of the Royal Irish Academy and noted mathematician.
- Robert Perceval Graves (Classics, 1830), Irish biographer and clergyman
- George Hamond (Classics, 1637), ejected nonconformist minister.
- Arthur Kenney (Classics, 1793), Church of Ireland clergyman.
- Richard Frederick Littledale (Classics, 1852), Church of Ireland clergyman.
- Richard Mant (Classics, 1794), Church of Ireland bishop.
- Henry McAdoo (Modern Languages, 1936), Church of Ireland clergyman.
- Mortimer O'Sullivan (Classics, 1813), Church of Ireland convert and clergyman, Orange Order member.
- William Reeves (Classics, 1833), Church of Ireland bishop and antiquary.
- Philip Skelton (Classics, 1726), Church of Ireland clergyman and writer.
- George Simms (Classics, 1930), Church of Ireland Archbishop of Dublin.
- Edward Smyth (Classics, 1678), Church of Ireland bishop.
- Joseph Stock (Classics, 1759), Church of Ireland bishop.
- William Tisdall (Classics, 1692), Church of Ireland clergyman and writer.
- James Ussher (Classics, 1594), Archbishop of Armagh and Primate of All Ireland. One of the first appointed scholars.

== Sports ==
- Hugo MacNeill (Economic and Social Studies, 1979), former Irish rugby international and British and Irish Lions player.
- Louise Moriarty (Engineering, 2000), Irish racing cyclist.

== In popular culture ==
In Sally Rooney's 2018 novel Normal People, set in Trinity, the two protagonists are elected scholars - Connell in English, and Marianne in History and Political Science. Rooney is a former scholar, as is Lenny Abrahamson, who directed the TV series based on the novel.

== See also ==
- List of chancellors of the University of Dublin
- List of professorships at the University of Dublin
- List of provosts of Trinity College Dublin
- List of Trinity College Dublin people
