= Who's Afraid of Conceptual Art =

2009 book by Peter Goldie and Elisabeth Schellekens

- Authors: Peter Goldie, Elisabeth Schellekens
- Language: English
- Subject: aesthetics
- Publisher: Routledge
- Publication date: 2009
- Media type: Print (Paperback)
- Pages: 160 pp.
- ISBN: 9780415422826

Who's Afraid of Conceptual Art? is a 2009 book by Peter Goldie and Elisabeth Schellekens, published by Routledge, that offers a philosophical introduction to conceptual art. The book examines conceptual art through philosophical questions about how artworks are defined and appreciated, the relationship between ideas and physical objects in art, and whether conceptual art can possess aesthetic value.

== Background ==
In 2007, Goldie and Schellekens edited Philosophy and Conceptual Art, a collection examining the philosophical problems raised by conceptual art. The collection comprises fourteen essays in four parts, addressing conceptual art's status as an art form, its aesthetic value, its cognitive value, and its appreciation. Jeffrey Strayer described Who's Afraid of Conceptual Art? as the authors' successor to that collection and as the first book-length consideration of conceptual art in the history of philosophy.

== Structure and Themes ==
''Who's Afraid of Conceptual Art?'' is divided into five chapters: “The Challenge of Conceptual Art”, “The Definition and the Thing”, “Appreciating Conceptual Art”, “Aesthetics and Beyond”, and “What's Left Once Aesthetic Appreciation Has Gone?”

In the opening chapters, Goldie and Schellekens discuss characteristics frequently associated with conceptual art, including self-reflexivity, irony, resistance to established definitions and media, dematerialization, and dependence on artistic or theoretical discourse. They maintain that these characteristics do not themselves define conceptual art.

The author developed what they call the "idea idea": the concept that, in conceptual art, the idea is the medium of appreciation, whereas a physical manifestation or presentation may function only as a means for the audience to access the idea. They contrast this account with traditional artworks, in which material and perceptual features perform a central role in aesthetic appreciation

The book subsequently considers whether conceptual art can have aesthetic value. It distinguishes three positions "contra aesthetics", which accepts conceptual art while denying its value in terms of aesthetic; "aesthetic traditionalism", which regards aesthetic experience as a requirement for art; and "aesthetic idealism", under which ideas may have aesthetic experiential properties

Goldie and Schellekens ultimately argue that conceptual art may possess aesthetic and cognitive value, which is often less than traditional art in providing a broadly shared appreciation of human experience. They therefore conclude that even good conceptual art may be “not wholly successful as art”

== Reception ==
Jeffrey Strayer, an artist and philosopher at Indiana University, reviewing in "Philosophy in Review", depicted it as “thoughtful, informative, and provocative” and recommended it to philosophers, artists, critics, art historians, and students. He nevertheless doubted the authors’ distinction between an idea as the medium of a conceptual art and its physical or linguistic presentation as a mere means. Strayer argued that the presentation might itself function as a medium and that an artwork could involve several media. He also questioned how appreciation could be dictated by an idea when a work supports several possible ideas or interpretations.

Štěpán Kubalík, an aesthetics scholar at Charles University, writing in Estetika, praised the book’s accessibility and described it as “a perfect introduction for beginners in the fields of philosophy, visual studies, and aesthetics”. He considered the “idea idea” plausible and credited the authors with identifying the central questions surrounding conceptual art. He nevertheless criticized them for not specifying adequately what they meant by an idea. Kubalík also argued that their conception of the aesthetic was unduly narrow because it identified traditional aesthetic experience with perceptual experience. He considered their inclusion of literature among the traditional arts problematic, since literary appreciation, like the appreciation of conceptual art, is closely associated with ideas rather than perceptual qualities.

Carl Matheson, a philosopher at the University of Manitoba, reviewed the book in “The British Journal of Aesthetics”. He characterized it as “a valuable introduction” to a topic long overdue for sustained treatment by analytic philosophers and noted that, together with Philosophy and Conceptual Art, it constituted a significant proportion of the literature in the analytic philosophy of conceptual art. However, Matheson argued that the authors did not sufficiently specify the kind of ideas that they regard as conceptual artwork. He additionally challenged their treatment of physical objects as merely means rather than components of the art piece, and contended that their account drew an overly sharp distinction between conceptual art and other art forms.

== Later Scholarly Discussion ==
Wesley D. Cray challenged Goldie and Schellekens's "idea idea" in his 2014 article "Conceptual Art, Ideas, and Ontology". His objections concern several questions that this view leaves unresolved. Where is an artwork located if it is an idea? How can two works be distinct when they express the same idea? And does a work cease to exist when its idea is forgotten? Rather than identifying artworks with ideas, Cray described them as "artifacts imbued with ideas." On his account, these artifacts can be objects, events, or activities presented in ways that invite the spectator to appreciate the artistic ideas they embody. He also challenged the claim that conceptual art is fundamentally different from traditional art. For Cray, the difference lies in the importance given to physical and conceptual features when appreciating a work, not in the kind of thing the artwork is.

In her 2015 article on the acquaintance principle, Louise Hanson examined Goldie and Schellekens's claim that conceptual artworks are ideas. The principle holds that judging an artwork requires firsthand experience of it. Hanson pointed out a difficulty: if a conceptual artwork simply is an idea, learning that idea through a description might count as encountering the work itself. In that case, judgements based on descriptions alone would suffice. She rejected the identification of artworks with ideas, arguing that a work's physical form can contribute to its artistic value. Robert Rauschenberg's Erased de Kooning Drawing illustrates her point: writing down the idea of erasing a drawing would not create the same work or give it the same value. Hanson concluded that descriptions can support judgements of some conceptual artworks without direct exposure with the work themselves, though acquaintance with particular features might still be necessary.

Julian Dodd described Who’s Afraid of Conceptual Art? as analytic philosophy’s first sustained treatment of conceptual art, praising its accessibility to non-specialists and its substantive philosophical arguments. Although he considered Goldie and Schellekens’s account of the appreciation of conceptual art persuasive, he rejected their “idea idea”—the view that conceptual artworks are ideas and that ideas constitute their medium. Dodd argued that this theory was insufficiently motivated and underdeveloped because the authors did not specify the ontological nature of the relevant ideas. He also rejected its assumption that conceptual artworks share a single ontology, maintaining instead that conceptual art is a cross-media genre whose works may be physical objects, events, or repeatable types.

Daniela Šterbáková applied Goldie and Schellekens’s position—which she termed “conceptualism”—to John Cage’s 4′33″. On this interpretation, the work is appreciated through the ideas it communicates, while its score and performance serve only as means of conveying those ideas. Šterbáková argued that this interpretation did not adequately explain the work’s meaning or appreciation. Drawing on Dodd’s alternative account, she maintained that the performance enables the audience to experience the work’s intentional silence through the performers’ physical gestures. She concluded that 4′33″ cannot be reduced to the idea proposed by Cage and remains open to other interpretations made possible by experiencing its performance.

Diarmuid Costello characterized Goldie and Schellekens's theory as the most ambitious attempt in the analytic tradition to formulate a general definition of conceptual art. He nevertheless argued that their distinction between ideas as the artistic medium and physical objects as mere means applies only to the “strong” or exclusively idea-based form of conceptual art, which he regarded as a minority position within the broader field. Costello proposed instead that conceptual art encompasses both strong non-perceptual works, whose perceptible properties are irrelevant to their appreciation, and weak non-perceptual works, whose perceptible properties contribute to but do not exhaust their artistic significance. He therefore rejected the application of the “idea idea” to conceptual art as a whole.
