= Hans Maes =

Philosophy lecturer

- Occupation(s): Philosopher, professor
- Years active: 2000s–present
- Employer(s): LUCA School of Arts, University of Leuven
- Organization: British Society of Aesthetics (President since 2024)
- Known for: Aesthetics, philosophy of art
- Notable work: Before Sunrise, Before Sunset, Before Midnight (2021); Portraits and Philosophy (2020); Conversations on Art and Aesthetics (2017)
- Title: Professor & Vice Dean

Hans Maes is Professor & Vice Dean at LUCA School of Arts (University of Leuven). Until 2024, he was senior philosophy lecturer and co-director of the Aesthetics Research Centre at the University of Kent. Since 2024, Maes is the President of the British Society of Aesthetics. He is known for his work in aesthetics and philosophy of art.

== Books ==
- Before Sunrise, Before Sunset, Before Midnight: A Philosophical Exploration. Routledge. 2021.
- Portraits and Philosophy. Routledge. 2020
- Conversations on Art and Aesthetics. Oxford University Press. 2017
- Pornographic Art and the Aesthetics of Pornography. Palgrave. 2013
- Art and Pornography: Philosophical Essays, ed. H. Maes and J. Levinson. Oxford University Press. 2012
