= Robert Henry Scott =

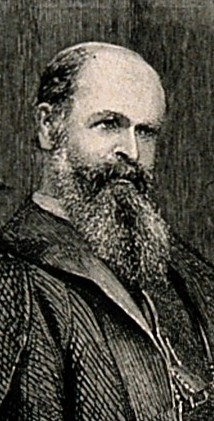
- Born: 28 January 1833; Delgany
- Died: 18 June 1916; London
- Education: Trinity College Dublin
- Occupations: Meteorologist; mineralogist
- Employer: Met Office (1867–1900)

Robert Henry Scott FRS (28 January 1833 – 18 June 1916) was an Irish meteorologist, who was president of the Royal Meteorological Society.

He was educated at Rugby School and Trinity College Dublin, where he was elected a Scholar.
