= James Auchmuty =

Irish-born historian and vice-chancellor

- Born: 29 November 1909; Portadown, Ireland
- Died: 15 October 1981 (aged 71); Bloomington, United States
- Awards: Fellow of the Royal Historical Society (1938); Fellow of the Australian Academy of the Humanities (1969); Commander of the Order of the British Empire (1971)

Academic background
- Education: Trinity College Dublin

Academic work
- Institutions: University of Newcastle (1965–74); New South Wales University of Technology (1952–65); Farouk I University (1946–52); Trinity College Dublin (1938–43)
- Main interests: Diplomatic history Irish history Colonial Australian history Biography

James Johnston Auchmuty, CBE, FRHistS, FAHA (29 November 1909 – 15 October 1981) was an Irish born historian and inaugural vice-chancellor of the University of Newcastle, Australia.

== Early life ==
Auchmuty was born in Portadown, County Armagh, Ireland, the elder son of James Wilson Auchmuty, a Church of Ireland clergyman, and his wife Annie Todd (née Johnston). James Johnston Auchmuty graduated from Trinity College Dublin (BA, 1931; MA, 1934; Ph.D., 1935), having been elected a scholar of the university in 1929. He was elected auditor of the College Historical Society for 1931–32. Auchmuty was schoolmaster at Sandford Park School from 1934 to 1936 and lectured in education at Trinity College 1938 to 1943.

== MI6 and Egypt ==
Due to poor eyesight Auchmuty was unable to join the armed forces, however he was recruited by MI6 and performed intelligence work and pro-British cultural propaganda in Ireland. Auchmuty decided to leave Ireland after World War II to avoid being interned for working on non-Irish interests. He then worked as an associate professor of history at Farouk I University at Alexandria, Egypt teaching and continuing his work of political reporting and propaganda until the overthrow of King Farouk in 1952.

== Career in Australia ==
British intelligence contacts then found Auchmuty a position as senior lecturer in history at the New South Wales University of Technology, Sydney (later the University of New South Wales) where he moved later in 1952. He was no longer an intelligence operative. In 1954 Philip Baxter, the university's director, sent Auchmuty, as associate professor, to head the school of humanities and social sciences at Newcastle University College. In 1955 he was promoted to professor of history and deputy-warden of the University College, becoming warden in 1960 and foundation vice-chancellor when the college gained autonomy as the University of Newcastle in 1965.

== Awards and memberships ==
Auchmuty was elected as a fellow of the Royal Historical Society in 1938. He was a foundation member (1956) and chairman (1962 to 1965) of the Australian Humanities Research Council and a foundation fellow (1969) and member (1969–70) of the council of its successor, the Australian Academy of the Humanities. Active in the Australian Vice-Chancellors’ Committee (chairman, 1969–71), Auchmuty was also a council member (1967 to 1974) of the Association of Commonwealth Universities and was awarded its Symons medal in 1974. From 1973 to 1976 he chaired the Australian National Commission for the United Nations Educational, Scientific and Cultural Organization. He was appointed a Commander of the Order of the British Empire in 1971 and in 1974 was awarded honorary degrees by the universities of Sydney (D.Litt.), Newcastle (D.Litt.), and Trinity College, Dublin (LL D). On retirement from the University of Newcastle in 1974, the Library and the sports centre were named after him, in honour of two of his particular interests. He and his wife then moved to Canberra.

Auchmuty died in Bloomington, Indiana, United States, survived by his wife, a son and daughter; a younger son had died in infancy.

Academic offices
New office	Vice-Chancellor of the University of Newcastle; 1965–1974	Succeeded by Don George
