= Aesthetics and Morality =

2007 book by Elisabeth Schellekens

- Authors: Elisabeth Schellekens
- Language: English
- Subject: Aesthetics, ethics
- Publisher: Continuum Books
- Publication date: 2007
- Media type: Print (paperback)
- Pages: 172 pp.
- ISBN: 9780826497628

Aesthetics and Morality is a 2007 book by Elisabeth Schellekens, in which the author provides an account of the main ideas and debates at the intersection of aesthetics and moral philosophy.
