= Peter Goldie =

British businessman and philosopher (1946–2011)

Peter Goldie (5 November 1946 – 22 October 2011) was a British businessman and then academic philosopher with interests in ethics and aesthetics. He was the Samuel Hall Chair in Philosophy and Head of the Philosophy Discipline Area of the School of Social Sciences at University of Manchester. He was educated at Felsted.

== Business career ==
Goldie had a 25-year career in business in the City of London, culminating as chief executive at the ill-fated British & Commonwealth, leaving in 1989.

== Philosophy career ==
Goldie turned to philosophy, in 1990. He studied at University College London for a BA degree and at Balliol College, Oxford for a BPhil followed by a DPhil, supervised by Bernard Williams, on emotion, mood and character. Following this, he was a lecturer at Magdalen College, Oxford, for two years and King's College London before becoming a professor at Manchester in 2005.

== Personal life ==
Peter Goldie was married twice. He was survived by his wife Sophie Hamilton, and two sons from his first marriage. He died of cancer on 22 October 2011, aged 64.

== Books ==
- Who's Afraid of Conceptual Art, with Elisabeth Schellekens, Routledge, 2009
- Philosophy and Conceptual Art, edited with Elisabeth Schellekens, Oxford University Press, 2007
- The Aesthetic Mind, edited with Elisabeth Schellekens, Oxford University Press, 2011
- On Personality, London, Routledge, 2004
- Understanding Emotions: Mind and Morals, Ashgate, 2002
- The Emotions: A Philosophical Exploration, Oxford: Clarendon Press, 2000
- The Mess Inside: Narrative, Emotion, and the Mind, OUP Oxford, 2012
