= Ferens Chair in Philosophy =

The Ferens Chair in Philosophy, established in 1927, is one of the founding Chairs of the University of Hull and is supported by an endowment provided by the founder of the university Thomas Ferens. Previous occupants of the Chair include Thomas Jessop OBE, Alan R. White, Peter Lamarque and Kathleen Lennon. From 2013-14 the holder of the Ferens Chair is Nick Zangwill.
