= Jenefer Robinson =

Jenefer Mary Robinson is an American philosopher, author and emerita professor of philosophy at the University of Cincinnati.

She writes on aesthetics, philosophy of psychology, philosophy of mind and theory of emotions. She has published two monographs, one edited collection, and numerous peer reviewed articles. She is on the editorial Board for the Journal of Aesthetics and Art Criticism and was on the editorial board for Notre Dame Philosophical Reviews. She was president of the American Society of Aesthetics from 2009 until 2013. In 2007 she was a Leverhulme visiting professor of philosophy at the University of Nottingham and in 2006 she received a Rieveschl Award for Scholarly and/or Creative Works. She received the National Endowment for the Humanities Fellowship in September 2002. She was interviewed by Hans Maes for his book Conversations on Art and Aesthetics, which also contains her portrait by American photographer Steve Pyke. Debates in Aesthetics, an open access journal published by the British Society of Aesthetics, dedicated Vol. 14 No. 1 to her work.

== Career ==
Jenefer Robinson has published widely on topics related to philosophy of art, literature and music. In Deeper than Reason: Emotion and its Role in Literature, Music and Art (Oxford University Press, 2005) she developed a new theory of emotion and its connection with the arts. In the book she claims that we not only "self-evidently make emotional responses in the presence of art works, but that some art works (...) need to be experienced emotionally if they are to be properly understood". In her edited collection Music and Meaning (Cornell University Press, 1997) she brings together ten essays on the nature of musical meaning.

== Selected articles ==
- 'The Art of Distancing: How Formal Devices Manage Our Emotional Responses to Literature', The Journal of Aesthetics and Art Criticism. Vol. 62, No. 2, Special Issue: Art, Mind, and Cognitive Science (Spring, 2004), pp. 153–162.
- 'Languages of Art at the Turn of the Century', The Journal of Aesthetics and Art Criticism. Vol. 58, No. 3 (Summer, 2000), pp. 213–218.
- 'The Expression and Arousal of Emotion in Music', The Journal of Aesthetics and Art Criticism. Vol. 52, No. 1, The Philosophy of Music (Winter, 1994), pp. 13–22.
- 'The Eliminability of Artistic Acts'. The Journal of Aesthetics and Art Criticism. Vol. 36, No. 1, pp 81–89.
- 'The Individuation of Speech Acts', The Philosophical Quarterly. Vol. 24, No. 97 (Oct., 1974), pp. 316–3.
- 'On Being Moved by Architecture', The Journal of Aesthetics and Art Criticism. Vol. 70, No. 4 (FALL 2012), pp. 337–353.
- 'Startle', The Journal of Philosophy. Vol. 92, No. 2 (Feb., 1995), pp. 53–74.
- 'Syntax, Meaning and Context: A Reply to Keenan', The Philosophical Quarterly. Vol. 27, No. 107 (Apr., 1977), pp. 162–164.
- 'Aesthetic Disgust?', Royal Institute of Philosophy Supplement, Vol. 75, pp 51–84.
