= Gregory Currie =

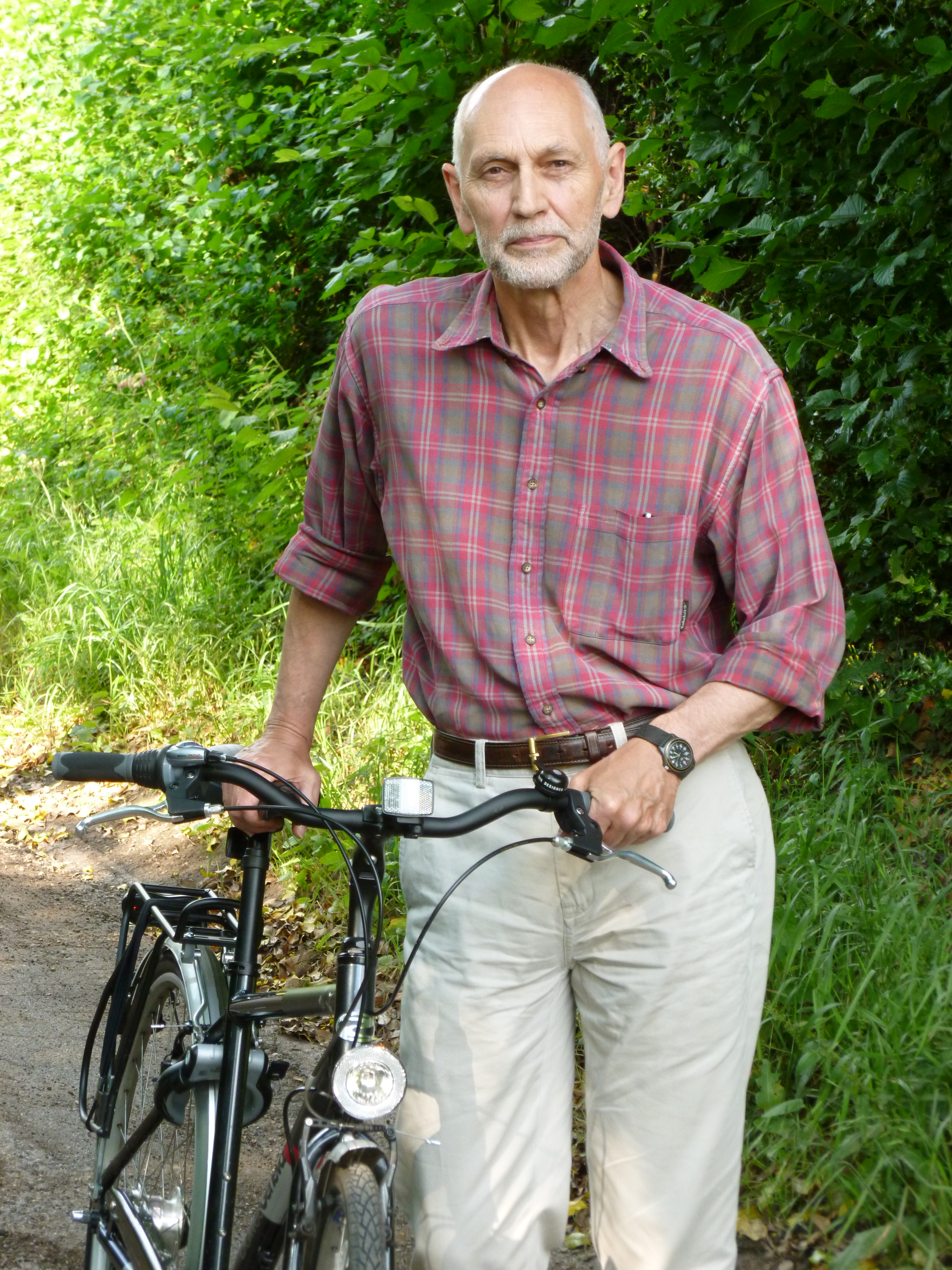
Gregory Currie

Gregory Paul Currie (/ˈkɜːri/) FBA FAHA is a British philosopher and academic, known for his work on philosophical aesthetics and the philosophy of mind. Currie is Emeritus Professor of Philosophy at the University of York and Executive Editor of Mind & Language.

== Life and work ==
Currie was educated at the John Ruskin Grammar School in Surrey, at the London School of Economics (LSE), where he took the BSc (Econ), and at the University of California, Berkeley, as a Fulbright Scholar. In 1978 Currie completed his PhD in Philosophy at the LSE, where he worked with Imre Lakatos and produced a thesis examining the objectivism of Frege and Popper. Following Lakatos's death in 1974 Currie and his LSE colleague, John Worrall, co-edited two volumes of Lakatos's philosophical papers, The Methodology of Scientific Research Programmes, Vol. 1 and Mathematics, Science and Epistemology, Vol. 2, both published in 1978.

Currie started his career as a scholar of Frege, publishing Frege: An Introduction to his Philosophy in 1982, but his interests shifted gradually to aesthetics and the philosophy of mind. He published An Ontology of Art in 1989 and The Nature of Fiction in 1990. Since the late 1980s Currie has published six research monographs; a collection of articles, Arts and Mind (OUP 2004); and nearly 100 research articles on topics in the philosophy of art and the philosophy of mind and cognition. Currie is widely considered to be one of the most influential living Anglophone philosophers of art post-1945.

Currie is Professor of Philosophy at the University of York, serving as Head of the Department of Philosophy from 2013 to 2016. Before moving to York in 2013 he was a professor at the University of Nottingham (2000–13). At Nottingham Currie served as Dean of the Faculty of Arts (2004–07) and then as Director of Research for the School of Humanities (2010–13). Before his return to the UK Currie was Professor and Head of the School of Arts at Flinders University, Adelaide. His first posts were in Australia, at the University of Sydney, and in New Zealand, at the University of Otago.

Currie is Executive Editor of Mind & Language, and a member of the editorial boards for both the Australasian Journal of Philosophy and the British Journal of Aesthetics. He is a Past President of the Australasian Association of Philosophy, a past Fellow of St John's College, Oxford, and he has held visiting positions at Clare Hall, Cambridge, the LSE, the Institute for Advanced Study, Australian National University, the University of Maryland, College Park, the University of St Andrews, and the EHESS. Currie was a member of the Philosophy sub-panel for REF 2014.

In July 2019 Currie was elected a Fellow of the British Academy (FBA), the United Kingdom's national academy for the humanities and social sciences. He was elected a Corresponding Fellow of the Australian Academy of the Humanities (FAHA) in 1996.

== Publications ==
=== Books ===
- Signs of Agency (OUP, under contract)
- Imagining and Knowing: The Shape of Fiction (OUP, 2020)
- Narratives and Narrators: A Philosophy of Stories (OUP, 2010)
- Arts and Minds (OUP, 2004)
- (with Ian Ravenscroft) Recreative Minds: Imagination in Philosophy and Psychology (OUP, 2002)
- Image and Mind: Film, Philosophy and Cognitive Science (CUP, 1995)
- The Nature of Fiction (CUP, 1990)
- An Ontology of Art (Palgrave Macmillan, 1989)
- Frege: An Introduction to His Philosophy (Harvester Press, 1982)

=== Edited books ===
- (with Kieran, Meskin, & Moore) Philosophical Aesthetics and the Sciences of Art (CUP, 2014)
- (with Kieran, Meskin, & Robson) Aesthetics and the Sciences of Mind (OUP, 2014)
- (with Alan Musgrave) Popper and the Human Sciences (Springer, 1985)
- (with John Worrall) Mathematics, Science and Epistemology, Vol. 2 (CUP, 1978)
- (with John Worrall) The Methodology of Scientific Research Programmes, Vol. 1 (CUP, 1978)

=== Articles & Book Chapters ===
- Is God’s Creation a Fictional World? Religious Studies (online first, 11 February 2026)
- Art as the Manifestation of Agency. Aristotelian Society Supplementary Volume 100 (2026), pp. 153–171
- Irony, Tragedy, Deception. European Journal of Philosophy 33 (2025), pp. 424–437
- Do We See Aesthetic Properties? The Journal of Aesthetics and Art Criticism 83 (2025), pp. 310–317
- Science, Fiction, and Science Fiction: Knowledge and Ignorance from Movies. In: Philosophy, Science and Cinema, ed. W. J. Gonzalez, Palgrave Macmillan (2025), pp. 41–71
- (with Wimmer, Friend, Wittwer, & Ferguson) Cognitive Effects and Correlates of Reading Fiction: Two Preregistered Multilevel Meta-Analyses. Journal of Experimental Psychology: General 153 (2024), pp. 1464–1488
- (with Wimmer, Friend, & Ferguson) Opening the Closed Mind? Effects of Reading Literary Fiction on Need for Closure and Creativity. Creativity Research Journal 36 (2024), pp. 24–41
- (with Ferguson, Frascaroli, Friend, Green, & Wimmer) Learning from Fiction. In: The Routledge Handbook of Fiction and Belief, eds. James, Kubo, & Lavocat, Routledge (2023), pp. 126–138
- Kinds of Irony: A General Theory. In: The Cambridge Handbook of Irony and Thought, eds. Gibbs, Jr. & Colston, CUP (2023), pp. 17–37
- (with Jon Robson) Authenticity and Implicature. Journal of Aesthetics and Art Criticism 81 (2023), pp. 387–391
- (with Petterson, Friend, & Ferguson) The Effect of Narratives on Attitudes Toward Animal Welfare and Pro-Social Behaviour on Behalf of Animals. Poetics 94 (2022)
- Reply to Abell’s and Gilmore’s comments on Imagining and Knowing. British Journal of Aesthetics 62 (2022), pp. 215–222
- Commentary on Fiction: A Philosophical Analysis, by Catharine Abell; and Apt Imaginings: Feelings for Fictions and Other Creatures of the Mind, by Jonathan Gilmore. British Journal of Aesthetics 62 (2022), pp. 185–194
- (with Jon Robson) Aesthetics and Cognitive Science. In: The Stanford Encyclopedia of Philosophy (Summer 2022), ed. E.N. Zalta
- (with Wimmer, Friend, & Ferguson) Testing Correlates of Lifetime Exposure to Print Fiction Following a Multi-Method Approach. Imagination, Cognition and Personality 41 (2021), pp. 54–86
- Style and the Agency in Art. In: Art, Representation, and Make-Believe, ed. S. Sedivy, Routledge (2021), pp. 265–283
- (with Wimmer, Friend, & Ferguson) Reading Fictional Narratives to Improve Social and Moral Cognition. Frontiers in Communication 5 (2021): 611935
- (with Jacopo Frascaroli) Poetry and the Possibility of Paraphrase. Journal of Aesthetics and Art Criticism 79 (2021), pp. 428–439
- (with Xuanqi Zhu) Aesthetic Sense and Social Cognition: A Story from the Early Stone Age. Synthese (2021), pp. 6553–6572
- Pictures and their Surfaces. In: The Pleasure of Pictures: Pictorial Experience and Aesthetic Appreciation, eds. Pelletier & Voltolini, Routledge (2019), pp. 249–269
- Visually Attending to Fictional Things. In: Perceptual Imagination and Perceptual Memory, eds. Macpherson & Dorsch, OUP (2018), pp. 186–208
- (with Tzachi Zamir) Macbeth, Throne of Blood, and the Idea of a Reflective Adaptation. Journal of Aesthetics and Art Criticism 76 (2018), pp. 297–308
- (with Jerrold Levinson) An Error Concerning Noses. Journal of Aesthetics and Art Criticism 75 (2017), pp. 9–13
- (with Anna Ichino) Truth and Trust in Fiction. In: Art and Belief, eds. Sullivan-Bissett, Bradley, & Noordhof, OUP (2017), pp. 63–82
- Models As Fictions, Fictions As Models. The Monist 99 (2016), pp. 296–310
- Methods in the Philosophy of Literature and Film. In: The Oxford Handbook of Philosophical Methodology, eds. Cappelen, Gendler, & Hawthorne, OUP (2016), pp. 641–656
- Aesthetic Explanation and the Archaeology of Symbols. British Journal of Aesthetics 56 (2016), pp. 233–246
- Standing in the Last Ditch: On the Communicative Intentions of Fiction Makers. Journal of Aesthetics and Art Criticism 72 (2014), pp. 351–363
- On Getting Out of the Armchair to do Aesthetics. In: Philosophical Methodology: The Armchair or the Laboratory?, ed. M. Haug, Routledge (2014), pp. 435–449
- Emotions Fit for Fictions. In: Emotion and Value, eds. Roeser & Todd, OUP (2014), pp. 146–166
- Creativity and the Insight That Literature Brings. In: The Philosophy of Creativity: New Essays, eds. Paul & Kaufman, OUP (2014), pp. 39–61
- (with Anna Ichino) Imagination and Make-Believe. In: The Routledge Companion to Aesthetics (3rd edition), eds. Gaut & Lopes, Routledge (2013), pp. 320–329
- Literature and Truthfulness. In: Rationis Defensor: Essays in Honour of Colin Cheyne, ed. J. Maclaurin, Springer (2012), pp. 23–31
- (with Anna Ichino) Aliefs Don't Exist, Though Some of their Relatives Do. Analysis 72 (2012), pp. 788–798
- The Representation of Experience in Cinema. In: Subjectivity: Filmic Representation and the Spectator's Experience, ed. D. Chateau, Amsterdam University Press (2011), pp. 41–51.
- The Master of the Masek Beds: Handaxes, Art, and the Minds of Early Humans. In: The Aesthetic Mind: Philosophy and Psychology, eds. Schellekens & Goldie, OUP (2011), pp. 9–31
- The Irony in Pictures. British Journal of Aesthetics 51 (2011), pp. 149–167
- Empathy for Objects. In: Empathy: Philosophical and Psychological Perspectives, eds. Coplan & Goldie, OUP (2011), pp. 82–95
- Art and the Anthropologists. In: Aesthetic Science: Connecting Minds, Brains, and Experience, eds. Shimamura & Palmer, OUP (2011), pp. 107–128
- Tragedy. Analysis 70 (2010), pp. 632–638
- Narration, Imitation, and Point of View. In: A Companion to the Philosophy of Literature, eds. Hagberg & Jost, Wiley-Blackwell (2010), pp. 331–349
- Bergman and the Film Image. Midwest Studies in Philosophy 34 (2010), pp. 323–339
- Actual Art, Possible Art, and Art's Definition. Journal of Aesthetics and Art Criticism 68 (2010), pp. 235–241
- (with Mitchell & Ziegler) Is There an Alternative to Simulation and Theory in Understanding the Mind?. British Journal of Developmental Psychology 27 (2009), pp. 561–567
- (with Mitchell & Ziegler) Two Routes to Perspective: Simulation and Rule‐Use as Approaches to Mentalizing. British Journal of Developmental Psychology 27 (2009), pp. 513–543
- Narrative and the Psychology of Character. Journal of Aesthetics and Art Criticism 67 (2009), pp. 61–71
- Some Ways to Understand People. Philosophical Explorations 11 (2008), pp. 211–218
- Pictures of King Arthur: Photography and the Power of Narrative. In: Photography and Philosophy: Essays on the Pencil of Nature, ed. S. Walden, Wiley-Blackwell (2008), pp. 265–283
- Echo et Feintise: Quelle est la Difference et Qui a Raison? Philosophiques 35 (2008), pp. 13–23
- Visual Conceptual Art. In: Philosophy and Conceptual Art, eds. Goldie & Schellekens, OUP (2007), pp. 33–50
- Framing Narratives. Royal Institute of Philosophy Supplements 60 (2007), pp. 17–42
- Both Sides of the Story: Explaining Events in a Narrative. Philosophical Studies 135 (2007), pp. 49–63
- A Claim on the Reader. In: Imaginative Minds, ed. I. Roth, OUP (2007), pp. 169–186
- Narrative Representation of Causes. Journal of Aesthetics and Art Criticism 64 (2006), pp. 309–316
- Why Irony is Pretence. In: The Architecture of the Imagination: New Essays on Pretence, Possibility, and Fiction, ed. S. Nichols, OUP (2006), pp. 111–133
- Rationality, Decentring, and the Evidence for Pretence in Non-Human Animals. In: Rational Animals?, eds. Hurley & Nudds, OUP (2006), pp. 275–292
- (with Nicholas Jones) McGinn on Delusion and Imagination. Philosophical Books 47 (2006), pp. 306–313
- (with Scott Campbell) Against Beck: In Defence of Risk Analysis. Philosophy of the Social Sciences 36 (2006), pp. 149–172
- Anne Brontë and the Uses of the Imagination. In: Contemporary Debates in Aesthetics and the Philosophy of Art, ed. M. Kieran, Blackwell (2006), pp. 209–221. Reprinted in: Aesthetics and the Philosophy of Art (second edition), eds. Lamarque & Olsen, Wiley-Blackwell (2019), pp. 393–401
- Interpretation in Art. In: The Oxford Handbook of Aesthetics, ed. J. Levinson, OUP (2005), pp. 291–306
- (with Mitchell & Ziegler) How Does Narrative Cue Children's Perspective Taking?. Developmental Psychology 41 (2005), pp. 115–123
- The Representational Revolution. The Journal of Aesthetics and Art Criticism 62 (2004), pp. 119–128. Reprinted in Arts and Minds (2004: ch. 12).
- (with Jon Jureidini) Narrative and Coherence. Mind & Language 19 (2004), pp. 409–427
- The Capacities that Enable us to Produce and Consume Art. In: Imagination, Philosophy and the Arts, eds. Kieran & Lopes, Routledge (2003), pp. 294–305
- Cognitivism. In: A Companion to Film Theory, eds. Miller & Stam, Wiley-Blackwell (2003), pp. 105–122. Revised and reprinted as 'Cognitive Film Theory' in Arts and Minds (2004: ch. 8).
- Characters and Contingency. Dialectica 57 (2003), pp. 137–148. Reprinted in Arts and Minds (2004: ch. 2).
- (with Jon Jureidini) Art and Delusion. The Monist 86 (2003), pp. 556–578
- Imagination as Motivation. Proceedings of the Aristotelian Society 102 (2002), pp. 201–216
- Desire in Imagination. In: Conceivability and Possibility, eds. Gendler & Hawthorne, OUP (2002), pp. 201–221
- (with Jon Jureidini) Delusion, Rationality, Empathy. Philosophy, Psychiatry, & Psychology 8 (2001), pp. 159–162
- Preserving the Traces: An Answer to Noël Carroll. The Journal of Aesthetics and Art Criticism 58 (2000), pp. 306–308
- Imagination, Delusion and Hallucinations. Mind & Language 15 (2000), pp. 168–183
- (with Kim Sterelny) How to think about the Modularity of Mind‐Reading. Philosophical Quarterly 50 (2000), pp. 145–160
- A Note on Art and Historical Concepts. British Journal of Aesthetics 40 (2000), pp. 186–190
- Visible Traces: Documentary and the Contents of Photographs. The Journal of Aesthetics and Art Criticism 57 (1999), pp. 285–297
- Narrative Desire. In: Passionate Views: Film, Cognition, and Emotion, ed. Plantinga & Smith, Johns Hopkins University Press (1999), pp. 183–199
- Is Factuality a Matter of Content?. Behavioral and Brain Sciences 22 (1999), p. 763
- (with Catherine Abell) Internal and External Pictures. Philosophical Psychology 12 (1999), pp. 429–445
- Can There be a Literary Philosophy of Time?. In: The Arguments of Time, ed. J. Butterfield, OUP (1999), pp. 43–63. Reprinted in Arts and Minds (2004: ch. 5).
- Pretence, Pretending and Metarepresenting. Mind & Language 13 (1998), pp. 35–55. Revised and reprinted as 'Pretence and Pretending' in Arts and Minds (2004: ch. 10).
- Tense and Egocentricity in Fiction. In: Questions of Time and Tense, ed. R. Le Poidevin, OUP (1998), pp. 265–283
- Realism of Character and the Value of Fiction. In: Aesthetics and Ethics: Essays at the Intersection, ed. J. Levinson, CUP (1998), pp. 161–181
- The Paradox of Caring: Fiction and the Philosophy of Mind. In: Emotion and the Arts, eds. Hjort & Laver, Oxford University Press (1997), pp. 63–77
- The Film Theory that Never was: A Nervous Manifesto. In: Film Theory and Philosophy, eds. Allen & Smith, OUP (1997), pp. 42–59
- On Being Fictional. The Journal of Aesthetics and Art Criticism 55 (1997), pp. 425–427
- (with Ian Ravenscroft) Mental Simulation and Motor Imagery. Philosophy of Science 64 (1997), pp. 161–180
- Simulation-Theory, Theory-Theory and the Evidence from Autism. In: Theories of Theories of Mind, eds. Carruthers & Smith, CUP (1996), pp. 242–256
- Film, Reality, and Illusion. In: Post-Theory: Reconstructing Film Studies, eds. Bordwell & Carroll, University of Wisconsin Press (1996), pp. 325–344
- Visual Imagery as the Simulation of Vision. Mind & Language 10 (1995), pp. 25–44
- Unreliability Refigured: Narrative in Literature and Film. The Journal of Aesthetics and Art Criticism 53 (1995), pp. 19–29
- The Moral Psychology of Fiction. Australasian Journal of Philosophy 73 (1995), pp. 250–259
- Imagination and Simulation: Aesthetics Meets Cognitive Science. In: Mental Simulation, eds. Davies & Stone, Blackwell (1995), pp. 151–169
- The Long Goodbye: The Imaginary Language of Film. British Journal of Aesthetics 33 (1993), pp. 207–219
- On the Road to Antirealism. Inquiry 36 (1993), pp. 465–483
- Interpretation and Objectivity. Mind 102 (1993), pp. 413–428
- Impersonal Imagining: A Reply to Jerrold Levinson. Philosophical Quarterly 43 (1993) pp. 79–82
- Aliens, Too. Analysis 53 (1993), pp. 116–118
- McTaggart at the Movies. Philosophy 67 (1992), pp. 343–355
- Work and Text. Mind 100 (1991), pp. 325–340. Reprinted in Arts and Minds (2004: ch. 1).
- Visual Fictions. Philosophical Quarterly 41 (1991), pp. 129–143
- Text without Context: Some Errors of Stanley Fish. Philosophy and Literature 15 (1991), pp. 212–228
- Photography, Painting and Perception. The Journal of Aesthetics and Art Criticism 49 (1991), pp. 23–29
- Interpreting Fictions. In: On Literary Theory and Philosophy, eds. Freadman & Reinhardt, Palgrave Macmillan (1991), pp. 96–112
- Supervenience, Essentialism and Aesthetic Properties. Philosophical Studies 58 (1990), pp. 243–257
- Metaphysical Individualism. In: Freedom and Rationality, eds. D'Agostino & Jarvie, Springer (1989), pp. 47–65
- Realism in the Social Sciences: Social Kinds and Social Laws. In: Relativism and Realism in Science, ed. R. Nola, Springer (1988), pp. 205–227
- Fictional Names. Australasian Journal of Philosophy 66 (1988), pp. 471–488
- Remarks on Frege's Conception of Inference. Notre Dame Journal of Formal Logic 28 (1987), pp. 55–68
- Milne on the Context Principle. Mind 96 (1987), pp. 543–544
- Works of Fiction and Illocutionary Acts. Philosophy and Literature 10 (1986), pp. 304–308
- Fictional Truth. Philosophical Studies 50 (1986), pp. 195–212
- Continuity and Change in Frege's Philosophy of Mathematics. In: Frege Synthesized, eds. Haaparanta & Hintikka, Springer (1986), pp. 345–373
- What is Fiction?. The Journal of Aesthetics and Art Criticism 43 (1985), pp. 385–392
- The Authentic and the Aesthetic. American Philosophical Quarterly 22 (1985), pp. 153–160
- The Analysis of Thoughts. Australasian Journal of Philosophy 63 (1985), pp. 283–298
- Individualism and Global Supervenience. British Journal for the Philosophy of Science 35 (1984), pp. 345–358
- Frege's Metaphysical Argument. Philosophical Quarterly 34 (1984), pp. 329–342
- Frege on Thoughts: A Reply. Mind 93 (1984), pp. 256–258
- (with Peter Eggenberger) Knowledge of Meaning. Noûs 17 (1983), pp. 267–279
- Interpreting Frege: A Reply to Michael Dummett. Inquiry 26 (1983), pp. 345–359
- Frege, Sense and Mathematical Knowledge. Australasian Journal of Philosophy 60 (1982), pp. 5–19
- A Note on Realism. Philosophy of Science 49 (1982), pp. 263–267
- The Origin of Frege's Realism. Inquiry 24 (1981), pp. 448–454
- The Role of Normative Assumptions in Historical Explanation. Philosophy of Science 47 (1980), pp. 456–473
- Frege on Thoughts. Mind 89 (1980), pp. 234–248
- (with Graham Oddie) Changing Numbers. Theoria 46 (1980), pp. 148–164
- Lakatos's Philosophy of Mathematics. Synthese 42 (1979), pp. 335–351
- Popper's Evolutionary Epistemology: A Critique. Synthese 37 (1978), pp. 413–431
- Frege's Realism. Inquiry 21 (1978), pp. 218–222
- Was Frege a Linguistic Philosopher?. British Journal for the Philosophy of Science 27 (1976), pp. 79–92
