= James White (writer and translator) =

British historical novelist and translator

James White (1759–1799) was a British historical novelist. He was born in Dublin. He was elected a scholar of Trinity College Dublin, in 1778 and graduated BA in 1780. Nothing is known about his family, or the reasons that brought him to England where he spent the rest of his life.

== Works ==
- Hints of a Specific Plan for the Abolition of the Slave Trade (1788)
- Earl Strongbow: or the History of Richard de Clare and the Beautiful Geralda (1789)
- The Adventures of John of Gaunt (1790)
- The Adventures of King Richard Coeur de Lion (1791)
