= Kathleen Lennon =

British philosopher

Kathleen Lennon, a former Ferens Professor of Philosophy, is an Emeritus Professor of Philosophy at the University of Hull, England.

== Career ==
After studying for her undergraduate degree at the University of Kent, Lennon obtained her master's degree and doctorate from the University of Oxford. In 1979, she was employed as a lecturer by the University of Hull. Lennon was a founder of the university's Centre for Gender Studies in 1986, and of the Society for Women in Philosophy in 1989.

After some thirty years at the university, Lennon was, in 2008, appointed Ferens Professor of Philosophy giving her inaugural lecture, 'Re- enchanting the World: the role of Imagination in Perception' in 2009. She retired from the chair in 2014.

Her research areas are gender theory, the philosophy of mind, and embodiment, within the context of contemporary Anglo-American and Continental philosophy.

== Publications ==
- Explaining Human Action (London: Duckworth, 1990).
- Philosophy of Mind, with Steve Burwood and Paul Gilbert (London: Taylor and Francis, 1998).
- Theorizing Gender, with Rachel Alsop and Annette FitzSimons (Cambridge: Polity, 2002).
- The World, the Flesh and the Subject: Continental Themes in Philosophy of Mind and body, with Paul Gilbert (Edinburgh: Edinburgh University Press, 2005).
- ’’Gender Theory in Troubled Times’’, with Dr. Rachel Alsop
