= Barbara Gertrude Yates =

Irish mathematician

Barbara Gertrude Yates (1919–1998) was an Irish mathematician who seems to have been the first woman born and brought up in Ireland to gain a PhD in pure mathematics.

== Life and career ==
She was born in January 1919 in Dublin, to a family with a tradition of excelling in mathematics at Trinity College Dublin. Her Offaly-born father James Yates (1869–1929) had been a Trinity Scholar in Mathematics prior to his graduation in 1891, and was a school inspector in various parts of Ireland until 1922, when the whole family moved to Belfast following the partition of Ireland. Her older brothers Henry George Yates (1908–1954) and James Garrett Yates (1917–1957) had also been Trinity Scholars in Mathematics, in 1927 and 1936 respectively. She herself received that distinction in 1940, graduating BA in mathematics in 1941.

She was on the teaching staff at Queen's University Belfast 1942–1945, then at the University of Aberdeen 1945–1948, following which she moved to Royal Holloway College, where she lectured until her retirement at age 65. In 1952 she completed her PhD, awarded the following year by the University of Aberdeen, with a thesis entitled "A difference-differential equation". Her advisor was E. M. Wright.
