= William Greatrakes =

Irish barrister (c.1723–1781)

William Greatrakes (1723? – 2 August 1781) was an Irish barrister.

== Biography ==
Greatrakes, born in Waterford about 1723, the eldest son of Alan Greatrakes of Mount Lahan, near Killeagh, County Cork, by his wife Frances Supple, of the neighbouring village of Aghadoe. He entered Trinity College Dublin, as a pensioner 9 July 1740, and was elected a Scholar in 1744, but did not take a degree. On 19 March 1750-1 he was admitted as a student at the Middle Temple, and was called to the Irish Bar in Easter term 1761. He formally retired from the bar before 1776. He died at the Bear Inn, Hungerford, Berkshire, on 2 August 1781, on his way from Bristol to London, and was buried in Hungerford churchyard. On his tombstone was inscribed 'stat nominis umbra;' he was wrongly stated to have died in the fifty-second year of his age. In the letters of administration P. C. C., granted on 25 May 1782 to his widowed sister, Elizabeth Courtenay, who was sworn by commission, he is described as 'late of Castlemartyr in the county of Cork, a bachelor.'

== Junius connection ==
Greatrakes acquired some posthumous importance from his supposed connection with the authorship of the letters of Junius. The materials of the letters were said to have been furnished by Lord Shelburne, and worked up by Greatrakes as his private secretary. Greatrakes probably gained his introduction to Lord Shelburne through Colonel Isaac Barré, his fellow-student at Trinity College, Dublin; that he died at Hungerford, not far from Lord Shelburne's seat, Bowood, and that his tombstone bore the Latin motto prefixed to Junius's letters. Such was the story which Wraxall says was 'confidently circulated' in his time. The family, especially the lady members, obligingly supplied many curious 'proofs' in further support of the case.

The first public mention of Greatrakes's claim was probably in the Anti-Jacobin Review, in an extremely inaccurate letter, dated July 1799, from Charles Butler. The next published reference appeared in the Cork Mercantile Chronicle for 7 September 1804, in a communication from D. J. Murphy of Cork, who reports at third hand a story from James Wigmore that the original manuscripts of Junius had been found in Greatrakes's trunk. A later family reminiscence asserted that a Captain Stopford of the 63rd Regiment of Foot had received Greatrakes's confession of the authorship on his deathbed. Before any of the family could reach Hungerford, Stopford had fled to America with all Greatrakes's effects, including £1,000 in money. No Captain Stopford is in the army lists. A third communication appeared in the Gentleman's Magazine for December 1813. The writer, who signs himself 'One of the Pack,' states that Greatrakes had made the acquaintance of a judge by defending a friendless soldier, and thus been introduced to Lord Shelburne, 'in whose house he was an inmate during the publication of the letters of Junius.' The writer enclosed an autograph 'Will Greatrakes,' cut from a book that had been in his possession, of which a facsimile appeared at p. 545.

In 1848, John Britton reproduced all these absurdities as authentic facts in a work entitled 'The Authorship of the Letters of Junius elucidated.' He held that Barré was Junius, probably inspired by Shelburne and Dunning, and that Greatrakes was the amanuensis employed. There is no evidence that he was ever in Shelburne's family. Britton based his opinion on the facsimile of Greatrakes's signature in the Gentleman's Magazine. Chabot specified several points of difference between the handwriting of Greatrakes and Junius, and the whole story is inconsistent and absurd.
