= John V. Luce =

Irish classicist (1920–2011)

- Born: 21 May 1920; Dublin, Ireland
- Died: 11 February 2011 (aged 90)
- Education: Trinity College
- Known for: Atlantis theories
- Scientific career
- Fields: Classical studies
- Workplaces: Trinity College Dublin

John Victor Luce (21 May 1920 – 11 February 2011) was an Irish classicist, professor and Fellow of Classics at Trinity College Dublin. He was also the College's Public Orator between 1971 and 2005.

Luce entered Trinity in 1938 to read Classics, and was elected a Scholar in his first year, a highly unusual achievement. He took a double Moderatorship in Classics and Philosophy and was awarded Gold Medals for both subjects. He was Auditor of the College Classical Society in 1942–43. He was elected a Fellow of Trinity in 1948 and served as Erasmus Smith's Professor of Oratory until 1989.

John Luce was the son of Arthur Aston Luce, the longest serving fellow of TCD. He was also the nephew of Gordon Hannington Luce, the noted scholar of Burmese and Asian History and Bloomsbury group member, and first cousin of Rex Warner, classicist and author of novels such as The Aerodrome.

An avid sportsman in his youth represented Ireland in Hockey in the 1940s, and also played Squash and Cricket. He was a keen Chess player and played for Rathmines Chess Club in the Leinster Leagues.

== Partial bibliography ==
- The End of Atlantis: New Light on an Old Legend, London 1969
- The Quest for Ulysses (with William Bedell Stanford), London 1974
- Homer and the Heroic Age, London 1975
- Trinity College Dublin: The First 400 Years, Dublin 1991
- An Introduction to Greek Philosophy, London 1992
- Orationes Dublinienses Selectae (1971-1990), Dublin 1991
- Celebrating Homer's Landscapes: Troy and Ithaca Revisited, New Haven 1999
- Orationes Dublinienses Selectae II (1990-2002), Dublin 2004
