= Christopher W. Morris =

Canadian philosophy professor (born 1949)

Christopher Warren Morris
- Born: 7 June 1949 (age 77)

Education
- Education: University of Toronto

Philosophical work
- Institutions: University of Maryland
- Main interests: Moral philosophy; Legal philosophy; Political philosophy; Practical rationality

Christopher Warren Morris (born June 7, 1949) is professor and chair of philosophy at the University of Maryland, where he is also a member of the Faculty of Politics, Philosophy, and Public Policy.

His main research areas are moral, legal and political philosophy as well as practical rationality.

== Early life ==
Morris gained his psychology and philosophy degree from Vassar College, Poughkeepsie, New York in 1971, he went on to University of Toronto to do both his philosophy master's (1974) and his philosophy doctorate (1977).

== Academic career ==
From 1977 to 1982 he was the assistant professor of philosophy at the University of Ottawa. Morris then spent a number of years as a visiting lecturer at a number of universities. In 1986 he took up a position as associate professor of philosophy at Bowling Green State University (BGSU), he was made senior research fellow of BGSU's Social Philosophy & Policy Center in 1990, and from 1994 until he left in 2001 to go to the University of Maryland, he was their professor of philosophy.

== Selected bibliography ==
=== PhD thesis ===
- Morris, Christopher W (1977). Social relations, socialization and freedom: toward a social theory (Canadian theses on microfiche, no. 35270). Ottawa, Canada: National Library of Canada. OCLC number 15826837

=== Books ===
- Morris, Christopher W (1998). An essay on the modern state. Cambridge, England New York: Cambridge University Press. ISBN 9780521496254. translated into Portuguese as - Morris, Christopher; Sylmara Beletti (Translator) (2005). Um ensaio sobre o estado moderno (in Portuguese). Brazil. ISBN 9788576290346.
- Morris, Christopher W; Ripstein, Arthur (2001). Practical rationality and preference : essays for David Gauthier. Cambridge, U.K. New York: Cambridge University Press. ISBN 9780521781848.
- Morris, Christopher W (1999). The social contract theorists critical essays on Hobbes, Locke, and Rousseau. Lanham, Maryland: Rowman & Littlefield. ISBN 9780585114033.
- Morris, Christopher W (2009). Amartya Sen. Cambridge New York: Cambridge University Press. ISBN 9780521618069.
- Morris, Christopher W (2012). Questions of life and death: readings in practical ethics. New York: Oxford University Press. ISBN 9780195156980.
- Morris, Christopher W; Frey, Raymond G (1991). Violence, terrorism, and justice. Cambridge England New York: Cambridge University Press. ISBN 9780521401258.

=== Chapters in books ===
- Morris, Christopher (1996), "A contractarian account of moral justification", in Sinnott-Armstrong, Walter; Timmons, Mark (eds.), Moral knowledge? new readings in moral epistemology, New York: Oxford University Press, pp. 215–242, ISBN 9780195089899
- Morris, Christopher (2008), "The trouble with justice", in Bloomfield, Paul (ed.), Morality and self-interest, New York: Oxford University Press, pp. 15–30, ISBN 9780195305852
- Morris, Christopher (2008), "State legitimacy and social order", in Kühnelt, Jörg (ed.), Political legitimization without morality, Dordrecht London: Springer, pp. 15–32, ISBN 9781402085758
- Morris, Christopher W (2011), "The idea of moral standing", in Beauchamp, Tom; Frey, Raymond G (eds.), The Oxford handbook of animal ethics, Oxford New York: Oxford University Press, pp. 255–275, ISBN 9780195371963

=== Journal articles ===
- Morris, Christopher W (April 1984). "Existential limits to the rectification of past wrongs". American Philosophy Quarterly. 21 (2). University of Illinois Press: 175–182.
- Morris, Christopher W (Winter 2000). "The very idea of popular sovereignty: "we the people" reconsidered". Social Philosophy and Policy. 17 (1): 1–26. doi:10.1017/S026505250000251X. S2CID 13859510.
- Morris, Christopher W (January 2012). "State coercion and force". Social Philosophy and Policy. 29 (1): 28–49. doi:10.1017/S0265052511000094. S2CID 143472087.
