= Peter Lamarque =

British philosopher

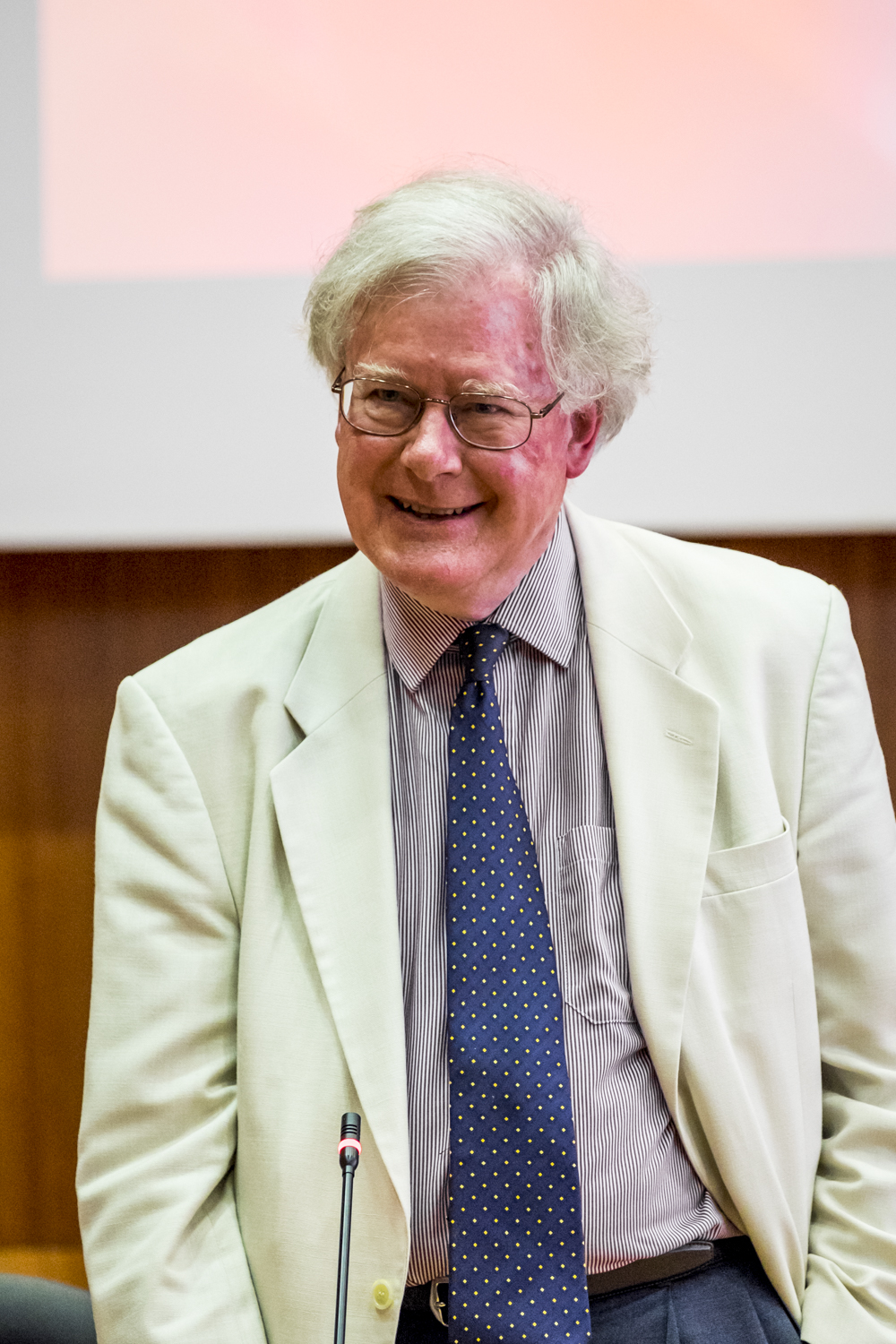

Academic background
- Education: University of East Anglia (BA); The Queen's College, Oxford (BPhil)

Academic work
- Discipline: Philosophy
- Sub-discipline: Aesthetics; Philosophy of literature
- Institutions: University of Stirling; Cornell University; Australian National University; University of Hull; University of York

Peter Vaudreuil Lamarque (/ləˈmɑːrk/; born 21 May 1948) is a British aesthethician and philosopher of art, working in the analytic tradition. Since 2000, he has been a professor of philosophy at the University of York. He is known primarily for his work in philosophy of literature and on the role of emotions in fiction.

== Education ==
Lamarque was educated at Marlborough College and received a BA degree in English and Philosophy from the University of East Anglia. He then completed a BPhil in philosophy at The Queen's College, Oxford in 1972, where he worked under the supervision of Laurence Jonathan Cohen.

== Career ==
From 1972 to 1995 Lamarque taught in the Philosophy Department at the University of Stirling, and from 1995 to 2000 he held the Ferens Chair in Philosophy at the University of Hull. In 2000, he moved to the University of York to take up his current position. He has held visiting positions in several universities around the world, including Cornell University and the Australian National University.

Lamarque has published extensively on various philosophical topics, mostly in the area of analytic philosophy of art. He published the first systematic articulation of an approach to the paradox of fiction usually referred to as 'thought theory'. He was editor of the British Journal of Aesthetics from 1995 to 2008. In 2009, he was chosen to give the first ever BSA/ASA Wollheim Memorial Lecture at the American Society for Aesthetics Annual Meeting. In 2018, he was awarded the "Premio Internazionale d'Estetica" by the Italian Society of Aesthetics.

== Bibliography ==
=== Books ===
- Truth, Fiction, and Literature: A Philosophical Perspective, Oxford: Clarendon Press, 1994 (with Stein Haugom Olsen)
- Fictional Points of View, Ithaca, NY: Cornell University Press, 1996
- The Philosophy of Literature, Oxford: Blackwell, 2009
- Work and Object: Explorations in the Metaphysics of Art, Oxford: Oxford University Press, 2010 (winner of the American Society for Aesthetics Outstanding Monograph Prize for 2010)
- The Opacity of Narrative, London: Rowman & Littlefield International, 2014
- The Uselessness of Art: Essays in the Philosophy of Art and Literature, Eastbourne: Sussex Academic Press, 2020

=== Books (editor) ===
- Philosophy and Fiction: Essays in Literary Aesthetics, Aberdeen: Aberdeen University Press, 1983
- Concise Encyclopedia of Philosophy of Language, New York: Elsevier Science, 1997
- Aesthetics and the Philosophy of Art: The Analytic Tradition: An Anthology, Oxford: Blackwell, 2004 (with Stein Haugom Olsen)

=== Articles ===
- "How Can We Fear and Pity Fictions?", British Journal of Aesthetics 21(4):291-304, 1981
- "The Death of the Author: An Analytical Autopsy", British Journal of Aesthetics 30(4):319-331, 1990
- "On Not Expecting Too Much from Narrative", Mind and Language 19(4):393-408, 2004
- "The Elusiveness of Poetic Meaning", Ratio 22(4):398-420, 2009
- "The Uselessness of Art", Journal of Aesthetics and Art Criticism 68(3):205-214, 2010
- "Wittgenstein, Literature, and the Idea of a Practice", British Journal of Aesthetics 50(4):375-388, 2010
- "Poetry and Abstract Thought," Midwest Studies in Philosophy, Vol. 33 (2009), pp. 37–52
