= Mortimer O'Sullivan =

Irish clergyman and writer

Mortimer O'Sullivan (1791–1859) was a Church of Ireland clergyman, writer and member of the Orange Order.

He was born a Catholic in Clonmel, County Tipperary, the son of a Catholic schoolmaster. He converted to Protestantism in boyhood and was educated as a Protestant. He attended Trinity College Dublin, where he was elected a Scholar, graduated with an MA in 1812 and was ordained about 1816.

In 1826 he succeeded Thomas Le Fanu, father of Sheridan Le Fanu as chaplain to the Military School in the Phoenix Park in Dublin. Throughout the 1830s and 1840s he was the chief ideologist of the Dublin University Magazine, a role he shared with his brother Samuel, also a convert and a cleric.

His influence on the Church of Ireland was considerable, not so much for the originality as the blatancy of his views. He was strongly anti-Catholic.

== Publications ==
Captain Rock Detected (1824)

Guide to an Irish Gentleman in Search of a Religion (1833)

Case of the Protestants in Ireland Stated (1836)

Theory of Development in Christian Doctrine (1846)

Remains of Samuel O'Sullivan, D.D. (1851)

== See also ==
- Dublin University Magazine
- Sheridan Le Fanu
