= T. E. Jessop =

British academic (1896–1980)

- Born: 10 September 1896; Huddersfield, England, U. K.
- Died: 10 September 1980 (aged 84); Hull, England, UK

Thomas Edmund Jessop, OBE (10 September 1896 - 10 September 1980) was a British academic best known for his work on George Berkeley.

== Biography ==
Jessop was born, the son of Newton and Georgiana (Swift) Jessop, in Huddersfield on 10 September 1896.

He was educated at the University of Leeds, where he received his B.A. (1921) and M.A. (1922). He gained his B.Litt from Oriel College, Oxford. From 1925 to 1928 he was an assistant lecturer at the University of Glasgow.

Jessop was the first member of Hull University's philosophy department and the first Ferens Professor of Philosophy (1928–1960). Jessop served as the philosophy department's sole member of teaching staff for seventeen years, while also teaching courses for the psychology degree. In 1946 he was joined at the department of philosophy by 'ordinary language' philosopher Alan R. White (who succeeded Jessop to the Ferens Chair in 1961).

His book The Treaty of Versailles: Was it Just? concluded that the 1919 peace treaty was overall a just one.

Jessop was a Methodist, serving as a local preacher and, in 1955 as Vice-President of the Methodist Conference.

== Works ==
- (with A. A. Luce) A Bibliography of George Berkeley (1934; 2nd ed. 1968).
- A Bibliography of David Hume and of Scottish Philosophy from Francis Hutcheson to Lord Balfour (1938; 2nd ed. 1983).
- Law and Love: A Study of the Christian Ethics (1940).
- The Treaty of Versailles: Was it Just? (London: T. Nelson and Sons, 1942).
- The Christian Morality (1960).
- Thomas Hobbes (1960).
