= Richard Stack =

Irish writer

Richard Stack (died 1812) was an Irish author.

Stack entered Trinity College, Dublin, as a sizar on 27 May 1766, and was elected a scholar in 1769. He graduated B.A. in 1770 and M.A. in 1779. In the same year he was elected a fellow of the college, and in 1783 he took the degree of B.D., receiving that of D.D. in 1786. He was appointed rector of Omagh, and died in 1812. He was vice-president of the Royal Irish Academy, and wrote the first paper in the literary section of its 'Transactions', titled 'Essay on the sublimity of writing' in 1787.

Stack was the author of:

- An Introduction to the Study of Chemistry, Dublin, 1802, 8vo.
- Lectures on the Acts of the Apostles, 2nd edit. London, 1805, 8vo, dedicated to Beilby Porteus, bishop of London.
- Lectures on the Epistle to the Romans, Dublin, 1806, 8vo, dedicated to Porteus.

Stack also made several contributions to the ‘Transactions’ of the Royal Irish Academy.
