= Mind & Language =

- Discipline: Philosophy, linguistics, cognitive science
- Language: English
- Edited by: Gregory Currie

Publication details
- History: 1986–present
- Publisher: Wiley-Blackwell
- Frequency: 5/year
- Impact factor: 1.596 (2017)

Standard abbreviations
- ISO 4: Mind Lang.

Indexing
- ISSN: 0268-1064 (print); 1468-0017 (web)
- JSTOR: 02681064

Links
- Journal homepage

Mind & Language is a peer-reviewed academic journal published five times a year by Wiley-Blackwell. It covers research in the study of mind and language primarily from the fields of linguistics, philosophy, psychology, artificial intelligence, and cognitive anthropology. The editor-in-chief is Gregory Currie.

According to the Journal Citation Reports, the journal has a 2016 impact factor of 0.962.
