= Matthew Kieran =

British philosopher

Matthew Kieran (born 19 December 1968) is a British philosopher and was Professor of Philosophy and the Arts at the University of Leeds. He is known for his works on aesthetics.

== Books ==
- Philosophical Aesthetics and the Sciences of Art. Royal Institute of Philosophy Supplements. Cambridge: Cambridge University Press
- Aesthetics and the Sciences of Mind. Oxford University Press
- Knowing Art: Essays in Aesthetics and Epistemology. Philosophical Studies Series. Springer
- Media and Values: Intimate Transgressions in a Changing Moral and Cultural Landscape. Intellect
- Contemporary Debates in Aesthetics and the Philosophy of Art. Contemporary Debates in Philosophy. Blackwell
- Revealing Art. Routledge
- Imagination, Philosophy and the Arts. Routledge
- Media Ethics. Routledge
