= British Society of Aesthetics =

Philosophical organization

- Established: 1960
- Founder: Herbert Read
- President: Stacie Friend
- Website: british-aesthetics.org

The British Society of Aesthetics (BSA) is a philosophical organization founded by Herbert Read in 1960 to promote the study of aesthetics. The BSA sponsors national and regional conferences, and publishes the British Journal of Aesthetics, Debates in Aesthetics (formerly The Postgraduate Journal of Aesthetics), as well as a newsletter. The organization also funds projects that promote the goals of the BSA. The Society holds an annual conference at St Anne's College in Oxford.
