= British Journal of Aesthetics =

- Discipline: Philosophy
- Language: English
- Edited by: Paloma Atencia-Linares, Derek Matravers

Publication details
- History: 1960–present
- Publisher: Oxford University Press (United Kingdom)
- Frequency: Quarterly

Standard abbreviations
- ISO 4: Br. J. Aesthet.

Indexing
- ISSN: 0007-0904 (print); 1468-2842 (web)
- LCCN: 63005058
- OCLC no.: 299334726

Links
- Journal homepage; Online archive

The British Journal of Aesthetics is a quarterly peer-reviewed academic journal covering philosophical aesthetics and the philosophy of art. It was established in 1960 and is published by Oxford University Press on behalf of the British Society of Aesthetics. The first issue was edited by Harold Osborne in November 1960. The journal was originally published by Routledge and then by Thames & Hudson, before switching to its current publisher in 1975.

== Editors-in-chief ==
The following people have been editor-in-chief of the journal:

- 1960-1978: Harold Osborne
- 1978-1995: Terry Diffey
- 1995-2008: Peter Lamarque
- 2008-2019: John Hyman, Elisabeth Schellekens
- 2019–present: Paloma Atencia-Linares, Derek Matravers

== Abstracting and indexing ==
The journal is abstracted and indexed in:

- Arts and Humanities Citation Index
- Current Contents/Arts & Humanities
- EBSCO databases
- Modern Language Association Database
- Philosopher's Index
- ProQuest databases
- Scopus

== Notable articles ==
Some of the most cited articles published in the journal are:

- Levinson, Jerrold (1 January 1979). "Defining art historically". British Journal of Aesthetics. 19 (3): 232–250. doi:10.1093/bjaesthetics/19.3.232.
- Carroll, Noël (1 July 1996). "Moderate moralism". British Journal of Aesthetics. 36 (3): 223–238. doi:10.1093/bjaesthetics/36.3.223.
- Lamarque, Peter (1 April 1981). "How can we fear and pity fictions?". British Journal of Aesthetics. 21 (4): 291–304. doi:10.1093/bjaesthetics/21.4.291.
- Tolhurst, William E. (1 January 1979). "On what a text is and how it means". British Journal of Aesthetics. 19 (1): 3–14. doi:10.1093/bjaesthetics/19.1.3.
- Budd, Malcolm (1 October 2003). "The acquaintance principle". British Journal of Aesthetics. 43 (4): 386–392. doi:10.1093/bjaesthetics/43.4.386.

== BSA essay prize ==
Since 2008, the journal publishes the biannual British Society of Aesthetics essay prize.
