= The Blow Parade =

- Genre: Musical comedy
- Running time: 30 minutes
- Country of origin: Australia
- Language(s): English
- Home station: Triple J
- Hosted by: Andrew Hansen; Chris Taylor
- Created by: Chris Taylor
- Produced by: Craig Schuftan
- Original release: 28 April 2010 – present
- Website: Official Website

The Blow Parade is a scripted radio program made and voiced by Australian comedians Chris Taylor and Andrew Hansen, and radio producer Craig Schuftan.

The program is a 25-minute music mockumentary in five episodes. It premiered on the Australian radio network Triple J on 28 April 2010. The series was released on CD and through the iTunes Store with bonus tracks. This album won the 2010 ARIA Award for Best Comedy Release.

== Episodes ==
=== Progressive rock (1979) ===
The band was Lake Deuteronomy, which was a 6-piece progressive rock band. Originally a 43-piece band but there were disagreements over which direction to take the band in. 8 wanted to become an experimental rock band, 14 wanted to go in a reggae direction, 12 wanted to be in an umpapa band, 6 enjoyed Gilbert & Sullivan light operetta and 2 who wanted to do impressions of bird calls. They tried to keep everyone happy with their Egypt record but this led to poor sales and 6 members relaunched Lake Deuteronomy as a progressive band.

They created the record Newspaper which was an experimental album to record an entire issue of The Daily Mail, including the articles, the classifieds, births and deaths and the movie listings.

They then went on to create The Flood, which inspired a stadium show that involved pouring in gallons of water to fill the stadium to simulate a flood. This caused multiple drownings and was very controversial because of this.

They then signed with Otto Ganon's label, Parasite Records and created Spool in the Pits of Prometheus. This album inspired further musical experimentation such as recording the guitar sounds in a deep sea dive tank next to the Titanic and attaching the drum kit to the roof and playing it upside down.

=== Folk (1984) ===
The singer was Egg Zagar who was a folk musician from the US. He was born Kenneth Silverman in 1958. His family were poor musicians so Zagar had to complete basic everyday activities such as brushing his teeth, mowing the lawn and buttering his bread with a guitar.

Zagar was angry about the growing divide between toothbrush owners and non-toothbrush owners so he wrote folk protest songs such as We Shall All Prevail.

His debut album released under Leech Records was Songs from a Death Bed and promptly became a cult figure from its rising popularity.

In 1965 Zagar went through a series of marriages with Liesel, Frumpina and his Korean meditation teacher as Otto did not agree with his choice of names as Zagar wrote love songs about them and had trouble rhyming words with their names.

Zagar and his Korean wife retired from the music industry and moved to Berlin for 8 years.

When Zagar returned to the US he went to record his new album in a studio in California near the beach. Unfortunately he got trapped under a beached whale on the first day while sun baking. He died on 24 August 1984.

Otto was determined to get a record so Pitch had to use the only piece of recorded audio which was "Don't use artificial sweetener, I'm a phenylketonuric" to make an album. With a combination of guest singers and the recorded audio Zagar's final record Whale Song was released and became a top selling album.

=== Punk Rock (1975) ===
The band was The Fat Cocks were a British Punk Group. The group, composed of brothers Archie Cock, Filthy Cock and Cecil Cock were from Sheffield. The group attended Brinsworth Comprehensive School and formed a band once they had graduated.

Originally the band could only play one note which is shown on their first record.

The band wanted to have a "garage band" sound, unfortunately they did not have a garage so they used to play on the busy street. However Otto Ganon passed by one day and offered them £10,000 to make a record on the condition they did not write or sing and of the songs, they did not approach the studio, they all changed their surnames to "Cock" and they all had to get a safety pin through their scrotums.

Their first album "Bastard, Bastard, Bastard, Bastard, Bastard, Bastard, Balls" received limited airplay however they received publicity for their large scale antics. These antics included releasing four hippopotamuses in Westminster Abbey and holding the weatherman at gun point whilst on tour in Australia.

Their second album "Pardon my Phlegm" was influenced by Archie Cock's interest in systems of government and Consociationalism. It was written during the rise of Margaret Thatcher. The Fat Cocks blamed Margaret Thatcher for nearly everything including the death of Anne Frank. The record also contained the hit political anthem "Hey Ho Hey Ho He Hoo He Hoo".

Their third album "Corgi Scum" was an attack on the British Monarchy. However most of the songs were attacking very minor members of the aristocracy and the corgi dogs.

Otto flew the band to New York City to play a rooftop gig but it was on the Chrysler Building which was quite challenging for the band to play on due to its angle.

Filthy Cock was into fridging at the time and it was becoming a problem for the band. Filthy died during a fridging incident on 27 November 1975. He was replaced by the bass player from the Children's band "The Pedals".

In 1995 they received a lifetime achievement award at The Grammys and later a Knighthood.

Archie Cock later became the chairman of a Tory Party Fundraising Committee and Filthy Cock returned to his former band, "The Pedals".

== Discography ==
=== Albums ===
List of albums
Title	Album details
The Blow Parade	Released: April 2010; Label: Triple J, ABC (2740476); Formats: 2xCD, download

== Awards ==
=== ARIA Music Awards ===
The ARIA Music Awards are a set of annual ceremonies presented by Australian Recording Industry Association (ARIA), which recognise excellence, innovation, and achievement across all genres of the music of Australia. They commenced in 1987.

Year	Nominee / work	Award	Result	Ref.
2010	The Blow Parade	Best Comedy Release	Won	
