= Stephen John Davies =

Stephen John Davies may refer to:

- Stephen Davies (field hockey) (born 1969), Australian hockey player
- Stephen Davies (philosopher), professor at the University of Auckland
