= Literalism (music) =

Literalism in music is a term with several distinct meanings, referring to a philosophical theory of emotional expression, a compositional technique of direct imitation, and a critical term for a naive interpretive approach. These meanings are not interchangeable and belong to different domains of musical discourse.

== Literalism in aesthetics and philosophy ==
In the philosophy of music, literalism is a resemblance theory that describes music as literally possessing the expressive emotional properties often attributed to it. This view stands in contrast to metaphoricism (also known as metaphorism), which holds that ascriptions of emotion to music (e.g., calling a passage "sad") are only metaphorical, since music is inanimate and cannot show feelings. Severin Schroeder and Michelle Liu argue, however, that a boundary between literalism and metaphoricism in music is not always clear. (cf. a position that a dead metaphor is literal and no longer metaphoric).

The resemblance theory of musical expressiveness, proposed independently by Stephen Davies (appearance emotionalism) and Peter Kivy (contour theory), is widely supported. Davies argues that emotion words are polysemous, having both a primary psychological meaning (the feeling of an emotion) and a secondary, but still literal, meaning that refers to the outward appearance of that emotion. According to this view, music expresses emotion by presenting emotion-characteristics-in-appearance. The music literally possesses the appearance of sadness; it does not feel sad, but it sounds the way sadness looks. Davies argues this resemblance is most evident in the similarity between music's dynamic, temporal structure and the movements of the human body. For example, slow, quiet music with a downward melodic contour sounds sad because it resembles the physical bearing of a sad person.

The contour theory, a precursor to appearance emotionalism, was published by Peter Kivy in his 1980 book The Corded Shell: Reflections on Musical Expression. This theory posits that music is expressive of emotions because its melodic contours and movements resemble the dynamic character of human emotional expression, particularly vocal contours.

There are two major differences between the literalist theories proposed by Kivy and Davies:

- Kivy focuses mainly on vocal contours, Davies argues that music's resemblance is to the full range of human bodily expression, including "gait, attitude, air, carriage, posture, and comportment";
- Kivy denies that listeners feel the emotions expressed in the music and argues that sad music does not actually make people sad. Davies, on the other hand, allows for the possibility of an emotional contagion, where the listener can "catch" the mood expressed by the music.

=== Critiques and related concepts ===
Philosopher Saam Trivedi argues against metaphoricism by noting that attempts to paraphrase the alleged metaphor "the music is sad" by describing its technical features (e.g., "it is slow and in a minor key") fail to capture the original emotional content.

Matteo Ravasio, while generally supporting a literalist framework, has proposed a category he calls secondary polysemy for instances where a musical expression cannot be justified by a clear resemblance to human behavior. Examples include the "tense" quality of a tritone or the "menacing" character of a low register and rich in overtones timbre, which seem to be appropriate descriptions without a direct behavioral correlate.

== Literalism as imitation ==
In a compositional and music-critical context, musical literalism refers to the technique of directly and literally imitating non-musical sounds, ideas, or actions in music, "music as simile". This practice is a form of word painting or programmatic music-making. It is often used in a pejorative sense to describe what the critic sees as a naive or overly simplistic compositional device that can render the subject ludicrous rather than flatter it. Some scholars, however, praise the bold experiments in imitation, like the ones in Berlioz's Roméo au tombeau.

Historical examples cited by critics include:

- Handel making frogs "hop and skip" musically in his oratorio Israel in Egypt.
- Haydn depicting a worm crawling "in sinuous trace" in The Creation.
- Bach using a literal "cock-crow" sound in the St John Passion.

The technique can be seen as compelling and effective. The work of Maurice Ravel in his ballets is also described as a form of musical literalism used to create a "musical narrative" that illustrates the libretto. Examples include:

- The spinning wheel in Danse du rouet, where a 6/8 meter and swirling passages project the "fast circular movements of the wheel."
- A game of shuttlecock (badminton), where harp glissandos and a high harmonic followed by a rest depict the flight and fall of the shuttlecock.

The author of A Book of Musical Anecdotes concludes that this type of literalism is almost always a failure artistically, and that its "only legitimate purpose" is for comedy.

Literal pieces of music (cf. cannons in the 1812 Overture by Tchaikovsky) are easier to understand, and thus can be a starting point for people with learning disabilities. Literalism also makes music child-friendly.

=== History of imitation ===
==== Madrigal and ayre ====
In late 16th-early 17th-century England, the madrigal and the ayre developed distinct approaches to musical literalism, marking a transition from illustrating individual words (known as word painting or madrigalism) to representing the broader contours of human speech.

The English madrigal employed a decisively new and individualistic form of expression where compositional devices were used to create a musical demonstration or argument. This contrasted with earlier medieval music, which sought to reflect a pre-ordained divine harmony through ordained scales and intervals. Composer and theorist Thomas Morley, in his 1597 Plaine and Easy Introduction to Practicall Musicke, codified many of these illustrative techniques. In a section on "Rules to be Observed in Dittying," Morley provides instructions for composers to frame their music according to the nature of the words:

- Pace: Light subjects should be set with quick notes ("minims, crotchets, and quavers"), while "lamentable" subjects should use slow and heavy motions ("semibreves, breves, and such like").
- Harmony: Words signifying "hardness, cruelty, bitterness" should be matched with "somewhat harsh and hard" harmony, while words of "complaint, dolour, repentance, sighs, tears" should have harmony that is "sad and doleful".
- Pitch contour: A literal correspondence between pitch and direction was expected. On words signifying "'ascending', 'high', 'heaven'", the music must ascend, and for "'descending', 'lowness', 'hell'", it must descend. Morley declared it a "great absurdity" to do the contrary.

This form of literalism was not merely decorative but could serve as a rhetorical device to create and distinguish meaning within the composition. For example, in Thomas Tomkins's madrigal "Music Divine" (1622), the composer distinguishes between divine and earthly love through ornamentation. In the latter half of the piece, the word "love" is set with a "melismatic quaver decoration," while the word "lust" is set with only a single note value, creating a clear musical argument for the lyric's moral position.

During the same period, the solo ayre developed a different approach to text-setting that moved away from the madrigalism toward imitating the intonational patterns of the human voice in discourse. This new style emphasized simulating properties of continuous speech rather than illustrating specific lexical items.

Composer Thomas Campion was a prominent advocate for this new style. In 1601, he criticized the older madrigalian literalism as "childish," comparing it to the "old exploided action in Comedies, when if they did pronounce memini, they would point to the hinder part of their heads, if video, put their finger in their eye". Instead, Campion argued for a "manly cariage" in music that graced "no word, but that which is eminent, and emphaticall".

The shift in ayre toward imitating the "intoning human voice" marked a crucial transition in text-setting, paving the way for the development of recitative in England.

== Literalism as an interpretive approach ==
In music criticism, particularly in discussions of modernist music, literalism or literal-mindedness can refer to a pejorative term for a naive or superficial listening practice. This type of listening takes the musical "surface" — the immediate sounds and gestures — at face value, without engaging with deeper, often ironic or contradictory, layers of meaning.

In his analysis of the music of Peter Maxwell Davies, Stephen Pruslin argues that the musical surface often exists in opposition to its meaning. For example, the use of historical dance forms or folk tunes does not represent the actual musical statement, but creates a tension between the external meaning of the quoted material and its new meaning within the context of the work. An interpretation based on "literal-mindedness" would miss this irony and misconstrue the work's expressive intent. Pruslin argues that such a misinterpretation is a "fallacy based on a misunderstanding of surface."

Art critic Michael Fried used the term "literalism" in a similar, though more philosophically complex, sense in his critique of minimalist art, arguing that Minimalist objects were merely "literal" objects that failed to achieve the status of art because they did not transcend their own objecthood.

== See also ==
- Janissary pedals, a piano feature imitatting the sound of the Ottoman military band

== Sources ==
- Begam, Richard (2016). "Schoenberg, Modernism, and Degeneracy". Modernism and Opera. Hopkins Studies in Modernism. Johns Hopkins University Press. ISBN 978-1-4214-2062-2.
- Crowest, Frederick James (1878). "Musical literalism". A Book of Musical Anecdotes: From Every Available Source. R. Bentley and son. pp. 196–197.
- Davies, Stephen (2011-08-01). "Artistic Expression and the Hard Case of Pure Music". Musical Understandings and Other Essays on the Philosophy of Music. Oxford University Press. doi:10.1093/acprof:oso/9780199608775.003.0002. ISBN 978-0-19-960877-5.
- Durant, Alan (1984). "False Relations and the Madrigal: An Alchemy of England's Golden Age in Music". Conditions of Music. London: Palgrave Macmillan UK. pp. 119–166. doi:10.1007/978-1-349-17591-8_5. ISBN 978-0-333-37277-7.
- Kivy, Peter (1980). The Corded Shell: Reflections on Musical Expression. Princeton University Press. ISBN 978-0-691-07258-6.
- Liu, Michelle (2023-09-01). "Cross-Domain Descriptions: The Sensory and the Psychological" (PDF). The Philosophical Quarterly. 73 (4): 950–964. doi:10.1093/pq/pqad043. ISSN 0031-8094.
- Mawer, Deborah (2017). "Musical literalism in portraying scenario 'Danse du rouet'". The Ballets of Maurice Ravel: Creation and Interpretation. Taylor & Francis. pp. 52–54. ISBN 978-1-351-54604-1.
- Pruslin, Stephen (1965). "Maxwell Davies's Second Taverner Fantasia". Tempo (73). Cambridge University Press: 2–11. doi:10.1017/S0040298200033519. ISSN 0040-2982. JSTOR 942856.
- Ravasio, Matteo (2018). "Analytic Perspectives in the Philosophy of Music". In Fieser, James; Dowden, Bradley (eds.). Internet Encyclopedia of Philosophy. ISSN 2161-0002. OCLC 37741658.
- Ravasio, Matteo (2017). "Stephen Davies on the Issue of Literalism" (PDF). Debates in Aesthetics. 13 (1): 20–32.
- Rodgers, Stephen (2010-03-16). "Music Smashed to Pieces: The Destructive Logic of Berlioz's Roméo au tombeau". Current Musicology: 37–73. doi:10.7916/CM.V0I89.5172.
- Schroeder, Severin (January 2013). "Music and Metaphor". The British Journal of Aesthetics. 53 (1): 1–20. doi:10.1093/aesthj/ays028.
- Shelley, Peter James (2013). Rethinking Minimalism: At the Intersection of Music Theory and Art Criticism (Ph.D thesis). University of Washington. hdl:1773/24092.
- Trivedi, Saam (2008). "Metaphors and Musical Expressiveness". In Stock, Kathleen; Thomson-Jones, Katherine (eds.). New Waves in Aesthetics. New York: Palgrave Macmillan. pp. 41–57. doi:10.1057/9780230227453_3.
- Williams, J. (2013). Music and the Social Model: An Occupational Therapist's Approach to Music with People Labelled as Having Learning Disabilities. Jessica Kingsley Publishers. p. 81. ISBN 978-0-85700-636-3.
