= Sonic philosophy =

Sonic philosophy or the philosophy of sound is a philosophical theory that proposes thinking sonically instead of thinking about sound. It is applied in ontology or the investigation of being and the determination of what exists. The materialist sonic philosophy is also considered part of aesthetic philosophy and traces the effect of sound on philosophy and draws from the notion that sound is a flux, event, and effect.

== Background ==
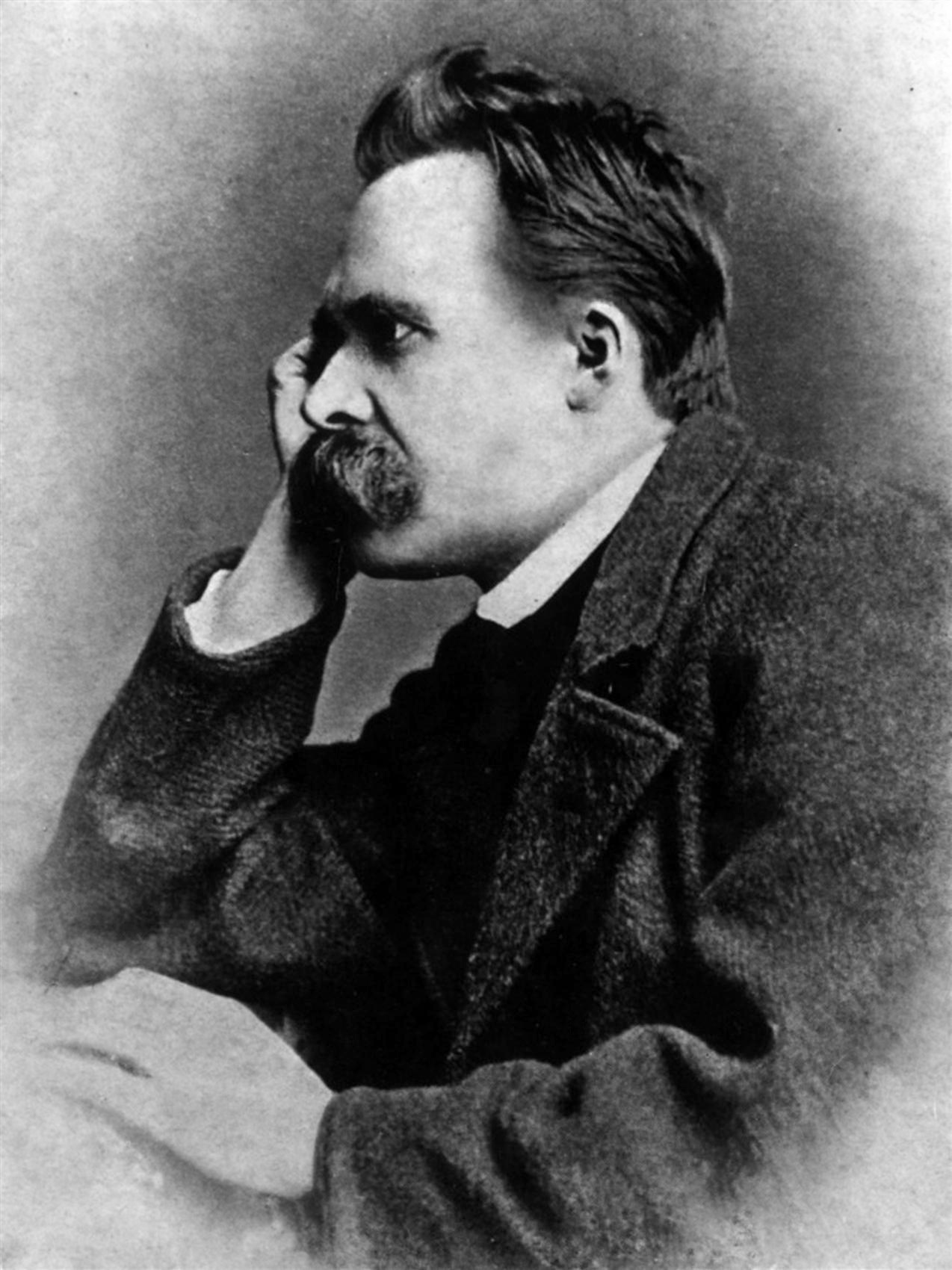
Friedrich Nietzsche

Scholars cite the role of the naturalistic philosophies of Friedrich Nietzsche and Arthur Schopenhauer in the development of sonic philosophy. Both maintained that music and sound directly figure the world as it is in itself and that they serve as the primary forces and movements behind all natural change, tension, creation, and destruction. The latter's notion of music considers it as a direct expression of the will. In his early unpublished writings, Nietzsche wrote that the concept of the philosopher involves his attempts "to let all sounds of the world reverberate in him and to place this comprehensive sound outside himself into concepts". These thinkers' positions underscored the philosophical importance of sound as they articulate the presentation of an ontology that unsettles the ordinary conception of things. This ontology allows the investigation of being and the determination of what things exist.

Modern sound philosophy also emerged out of philosophical aesthetics as scholars address the question of whether sounds and sounding artworks can be treated in the same way as other arts (e.g. visual arts) are approached.

Sonic philosophy is considered in opposition to the Kantian philosophy of humanism since it challenges the suggestion that the world is only "for-us" and mediated by discourse. A modern conceptualization articulated the philosophy as based on the idea that sound is a flux, event, and effect. It is also part of a contemporary project that rejects the essentialist and phenomenological approach to sonic theory.

=== Sonic event ===
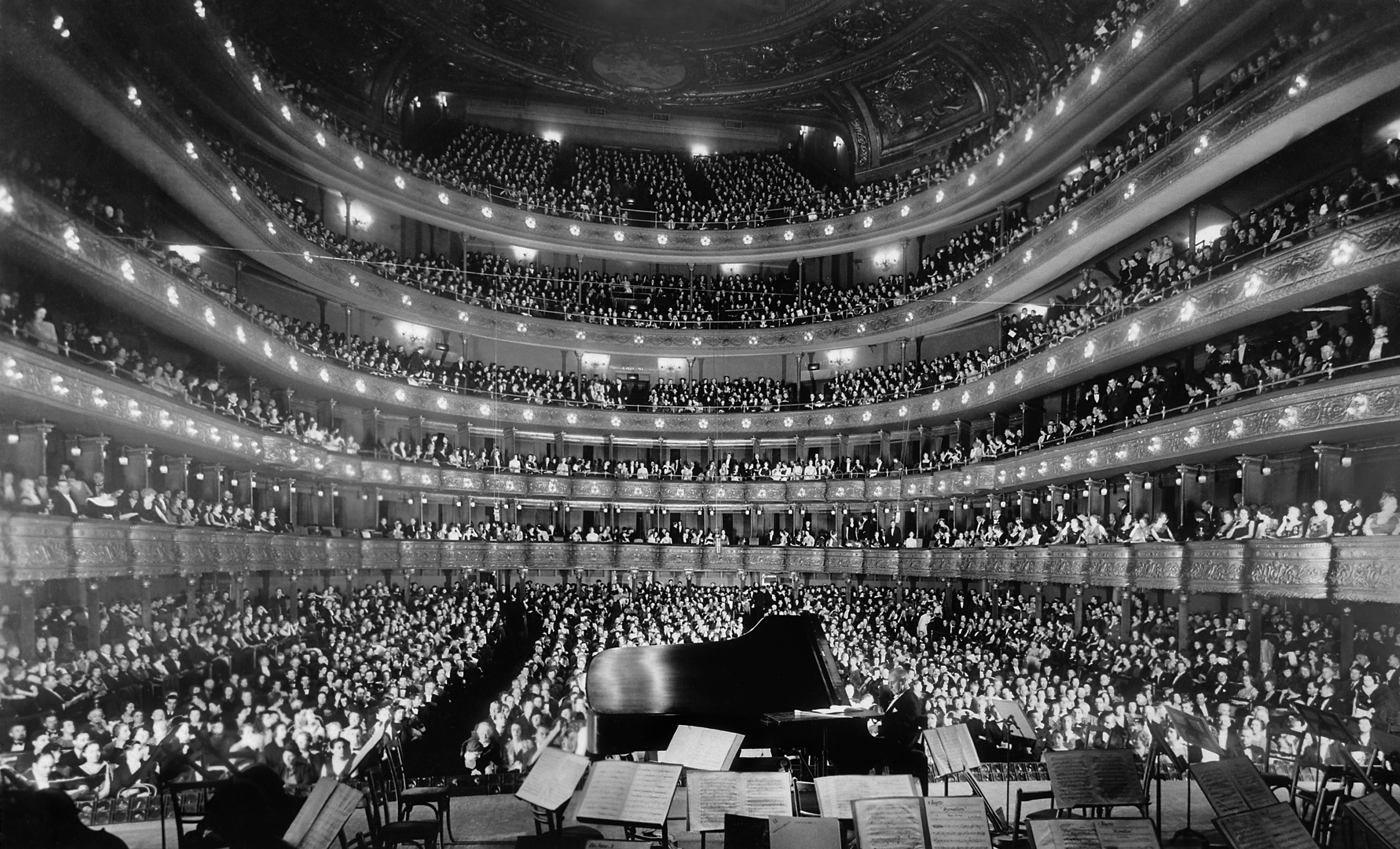
Sound as illustrated in this auditorium is said to be always a public event.

An element in the materialist philosophy of sound is the so-called sonic or acoustic event. In this conceptualization of sound, the event – beginning from a source and arriving at multiple locations – is always considered a public event, filling both ears and space. As an experience it shows that: 1) space is more than a conceptualization of materiality; 2) knowledge constitutes several voices; 3) circulation is affective and productive.

=== Flux ===
For thinkers such as John Cage and Max Neuhaus, sound and music are thought of as anonymous flux that is beyond the human contributions to it. According to Manuel De Landa, this particular notion of sound as a flux is critical in the conceptualization of all of nature and culture as a collection of flows that are captured and released through different isomorphic processes.

== Philosophies ==
Christoph Cox proposed a modern conceptualization of sonic philosophy that drew from the works of Nietzsche and Gilles Deleuze. Citing the lack of theories on sound art, he developed a materialist sonic philosophy that approached theorizing aesthetics by beginning with sound. Cox maintained that this method upsets the ontology of "objects" and "beings" and underscores the materiality of sound. He stated:

If we proceed from sound, we will be less inclined to think in terms of representation and signification, and to draw distinctions between culture and nature, human and nonhuman, mind and matter, the symbolic and the real, the textual and the physical, the meaningful and the meaningless. Instead, we might begin to treat artistic productions, not as complexes of signs or representations but complexes of forces materially inflected by other forces and force-complexes.

Thinkers who also developed their own sonic philosophy include Christof Migone who placed sound art within disparate and paradoxical contexts to address the sound's "physical diffuseness". In his work called Sonic Somatic: Performances of the Unsound Body, he also explored how sound shaped and disrupted the way art shifted from subject to object through to the abject. The work of Jing Wang cited Chinese philosophical concepts associated with sound such as resonance, shan shui, huanghu, and distributive monumentality as he explored the meaning and function of sound and expanded on the notion that "Chinese acoustics is acoustics of qi".

Sonic philosophy also underpinned a tactic called sonic warfare. It holds that, while sound is merely a vibration audible to humans and animals, it entails the perceptions of a human subject. In battle, sonic philosophy serves as a sonic intervention into thought, deploying concepts that are identified with sound, noise, music culture. These are then inserted into the weak spots of the history, philosophy, and psyche of the enemy.

== See also ==
- Philosophy of music
