= Christof Migone =

Swiss-born sound artist and writer

Christof Migone is a Swiss-born experimental sound artist and writer, formerly based in Montreal, now living in Toronto.

He currently an Associate Professor in the Department of Visual Arts at the University of Western Ontario. From 2008 to 2013, Migone was a lecturer in the Department of Visual Studies at the University of Toronto Mississauga and director/curator of the Blackwood Gallery.

Migone's solo recordings include Sound Voice Perform (2006), South Winds (2003), Crackers (2001), Quieting (2000), The Death of Analogies (1999), vex (1998), and Hole in the Head (1996). All of which were recorded on various labels: Avatar, ND, Alien 8, Locust, and Oral. His writing on audio art has appeared in EAR magazine, Radiotext(e), Radio Rethink, Theater Drama Review, Parachute, Site of Sound: of Architecture and the Ear, Experimental Sound and Radio edited by Allen S. Weiss, Writing Aloud: The Sonics of Language, S:ON Sound in Contemporary Canadian Art edited by Nicole Gingras, and Aural Cultures edited by Jim Drobnick. In Sonic Somatic: Performances of the Unsound Body, Migone proposed a form of aesthetic sonic philosophy, which explored how sound shapes and disrupts the way art shifted from subject to object through to the abject.

He was a founding member of the audio based artist-run center Avatar in Quebec City. Avatar releases audio projects by artists under the name Ohm/Avatar.
