= List of culturally linked qualities of music =

This is a list of aesthetic principles of music. It enumerates the various qualities by which music is judged aesthetically.

- Blues, an African American musical genre and quality of music that reflects an emotionally genuine soul and expresses melancholy, loneliness and tragedy
- Conyach, a musical quality that provokes the venting of emotions in listeners, associated with the music of Scottish Travelers.
- Dor, a "pleasant feeling of melancholy" especially evoked by the doina music
- Duende, a complex emotional quality of Spanish music, especially flamenco
- Masala, a term borrowed from Indian cookery to intend a Mumbai spicy musical mixture and the local production of movies and music (see also Masala film)
- Sakit Hati (lit. Indonesian for sick liver), an Indonesian term, associated with the degung genre denoting a sense of wistful long and sadness.
- Mehna, a term associated with Algeria raï music and is said to be similar to duende
- Salsa, closely associated with the salsa genre, the term salsa denoting a "wild" and "frenzied" musical experience, being used as a vocal interjection to acknowledge the musical excitement of a performance. This usage can also express a sense of pan-Latin cultural identity, based around the "hotness" and "spiciness" of Latin culture.
- Saudade, a Portuguese term, referring to an important element of fado; saudade is a mood, described as "a vague and constant desire for something that does not and probably can not exist, for something other than the present, a turning towards the future; not an active discontent or poignant sadness, but an indolent dreaming wistfulness", with roots in "Islamic fatalism, sailors' loneliness, and the unrequited love which was the perennial theme of troubadour poetry"
- Soul, is a music genre, and also a quality of music or of performance which evokes an emotional state and is reflective of African American performance techniques
- Swing, swing dance and swing jazz, a genre of popular dance music, and a quality of emotionally and culturally genuine music in the African American community
- Tezeta, an Ethiopian musical term, evocative of melancholy, nostalgia and bittersweet longing, being originally a traditional song, then a genre, a musical mode and a marker of cultural identity
