= Peter Kivy =

Professor emeritus of musicology and philosophy at Rutgers University

Peter Kivy (October 22, 1934 – May 6, 2017) was professor emeritus of musicology and philosophy at Rutgers University. He studied particularly the philosophy of music.

== Biography ==
Kivy received a B.A. summa cum laude at the University of Michigan in 1956, where he was elected to Phi Beta Kappa. He earned an M.A. in philosophy in 1958 also from the University of Michigan, an A.M. in musicology at Yale University in 1960, and a PhD in philosophy from Columbia University in 1966. He first taught at Brooklyn College from 1966 to 1967, He then joined the faculty at Rutgers, first at the Newark campus, where he became full professor in 1976, and then in 1978 moved to the university's main campus, in New Brunswick. He taught there for the remainder of his career, except for one year as a visiting professor at University of California, Santa Barbara.

His early work was on the 18th-century British aesthetics, primarily Francis Hutcheson. From the late 1970s on, he had been interested mainly in philosophy of music. His book The Corded Shell made him a propose the so-called contour theory, a precursor to literalism in the philosophy of music. One preoccupation of his had been the problem of what it means for instrumental music to "express" an emotion. His answer is that common emotions have physical behavioral expression in people that can be understood by appearance and imitated in music; thus, music cannot express more complex emotions that do not have an obvious behavioral expression. A similar position is developed independently by Stephen Davies.

Some criticism of Kivy's ideas is available in Music, Philosophy, and Modernity (2007) by Andrew Bowie and Filosofía de la Música. Respuestas a Peter Kivy (2017, published in Spanish by Daniel Martín Sáez) by James O. Young.

== Books ==
- Speaking of Art (1973).
- Francis Hutcheson's Inquiry Concerning Beauty, Order, Harmony, Design (ed., 1973).
- Thomas Reid's Lectures on the Fine Arts (ed., 1973).
- The Seventh Sense: A Study of Francis Hutcheson's Aesthetics, and its Influence in Eighteenth-Century Britain (1976, 2nd ed. 2003).
- The Corded Shell: Reflections on Musical Expression (1980).
- Sound and Semblance: Reflections on Musical Representation (1984, 2nd ed. 1991).
- Osmin's Rage: Philosophical Reflections on Opera, Drama and Text (1988, 2nd ed.).
- Sound Sentiment: An Essay on Musical Emotions (1989).
- Music Alone: Philosophical Reflections on the Purely Musical Experience (1990).
- Essays on the History of Aesthetics (ed., 1992)
- The Fine Art of Repetition: And Other Essays in the Philosophy of Music (collection, 1993)
- Authenticities: Philosophical Reflections on Musical Performance (1995).
- Philosophies of Arts: An Essay in Differences (1997).
- New Essays on Musical Understanding (collection, 2001)
- The Possessor and the Possessed: Handel, Mozart, Beethoven and Idea of Musical Genius (2001).
- Introduction to a Philosophy of Music (2002).
- The Blackwell Guide to Aesthetics (ed., 2004)
- The Performance of Reading: an Essay in the Philosophy of Literature (2006).
- Music, Language, and Cognition: And Other Essays in the Philosophy of Music, further collected essays of Peter Kivy (collection, 2007).
- Antithetical Arts: On the Ancient Quarrel Between Literature and Music (2009).
- Once-Told Tales: An Essay in Literary Aesthetics (2011).
- Sounding Off: Eleven Essays in the Philosophy of Music (2012).
