= Philosophy of music =

Branch of philosophy

Philosophy of music is the study of "fundamental questions about the nature and value of music and our experience of it". The philosophical study of music has many connections with philosophical questions in metaphysics and aesthetics. The expression was born in the 19th century and has been used especially as the name of a discipline since the 1980s.

Some basic questions in the philosophy of music are:

- What is the definition of music? (what are the necessary and sufficient conditions for classifying something as music?)
- What is the relationship between music and mind?
- What is the relationship between music and language?
- What does music history reveal to us about the world?
- What is the connection between music and emotions? (in the 19th century a debate began over whether purely instrumental music could convey emotions and depict imaginary scenes)
- What is meaning in relation to music?

Contributions to music philosophy have been made by philosophers, music critics, musicologists, music theorists, and other scholars.

== Philosophical issues ==
=== Definition of music ===
Explications of the concept of music usually begin with the idea that music is organized sound. They go on to note that this characterization is too broad, since there are many examples of organized sound that are not music, such as human speech, and the sounds non-human animals and machines make.

There are many different ways of denoting the fundamental aspects of music which are more specific than "sound": popular aspects include melody (pitches that occur consecutively), harmony (pitches regarded as groups—not necessarily sounding at the same time—to form chords), rhythm, meter and timbre (also known as a sound's "color").

However, noise music may consist mainly of noise. Musique concrète often consists only of sound samples of non-musical nature, sometimes in random juxtaposition. Ambient music may consist of recordings of wildlife or nature. The arrival of these avant-garde forms of music in the 20th century have been a major challenge to traditional views of music as being based around melodies and rhythms, leading to calls for broader characterizations.

=== Absolute music vs program music ===
There was intense debate over "absolute music" vs. "program music" during the late romantic era in the late 19th century. Advocates of the "absolute music" perspective argued that instrumental music does not convey emotions or images to the listener, but claimed that music is not explicitly "about" anything and that it is non-representational. The idea of absolute music developed at the end of the 18th century in the writings of authors of early German Romanticism, such as Wilhelm Heinrich Wackenroder, Ludwig Tieck and E. T. A. Hoffmann.

Adherents of the "program music" perspective believed that music could convey emotions and images. One example of program music is Berlioz's Symphonie fantastique, in which the fourth movement is the composer's depiction of a story about an artist who poisons himself with opium and then is executed. The majority of opposition to absolute instrumental-based music came from composer Richard Wagner (notable for his operas) and the philosophers Friedrich Nietzsche and Georg Wilhelm Friedrich Hegel. Wagner's works were chiefly programmatic and often used vocalization, and he said that "Where music can go no further, there comes the word… the word stands higher than the tone." Nietzsche wrote many commentaries applauding the music of Wagner and was also an amateur composer himself.

Other Romantic philosophers and proponents of absolute music, such as Johann von Goethe saw music not only as a subjective human "language" but as an absolute transcendent means of peering into a higher realm of order and beauty. Some expressed a spiritual connection with music. In Part IV of his chief work, The World as Will and Representation (1819), Arthur Schopenhauer said that "music is the answer to the mystery of life. The most profound of all the arts, it expresses the deepest thoughts of life." In "The Immediate Stages of the Erotic, or Musical Erotic", a chapter of Either/Or (1843), Søren Kierkegaard examines the profundity of music of Wolfgang Amadeus Mozart and the sensual nature of Don Giovanni.

=== Meaning and purpose ===
In his 1997 book How the Mind Works, Steven Pinker dubbed music "auditory cheesecake", a phrase that in the years since has served as a challenge to the musicologists and psychologists who believe otherwise. Among those to note this stir was Philip Ball in his book The Music Instinct where he noted that music seems to reach to the very core of what it means to be human: "There are cultures in the world where to say 'I'm not musical' would be meaningless," Ball writes, "akin to saying 'I'm not alive'." In a filmed debate, Ball suggests that music might get its emotive power through its ability to mimic people and perhaps its ability to entice us lies in music's ability to set up an expectation and then violate it.

=== Aesthetics of music ===
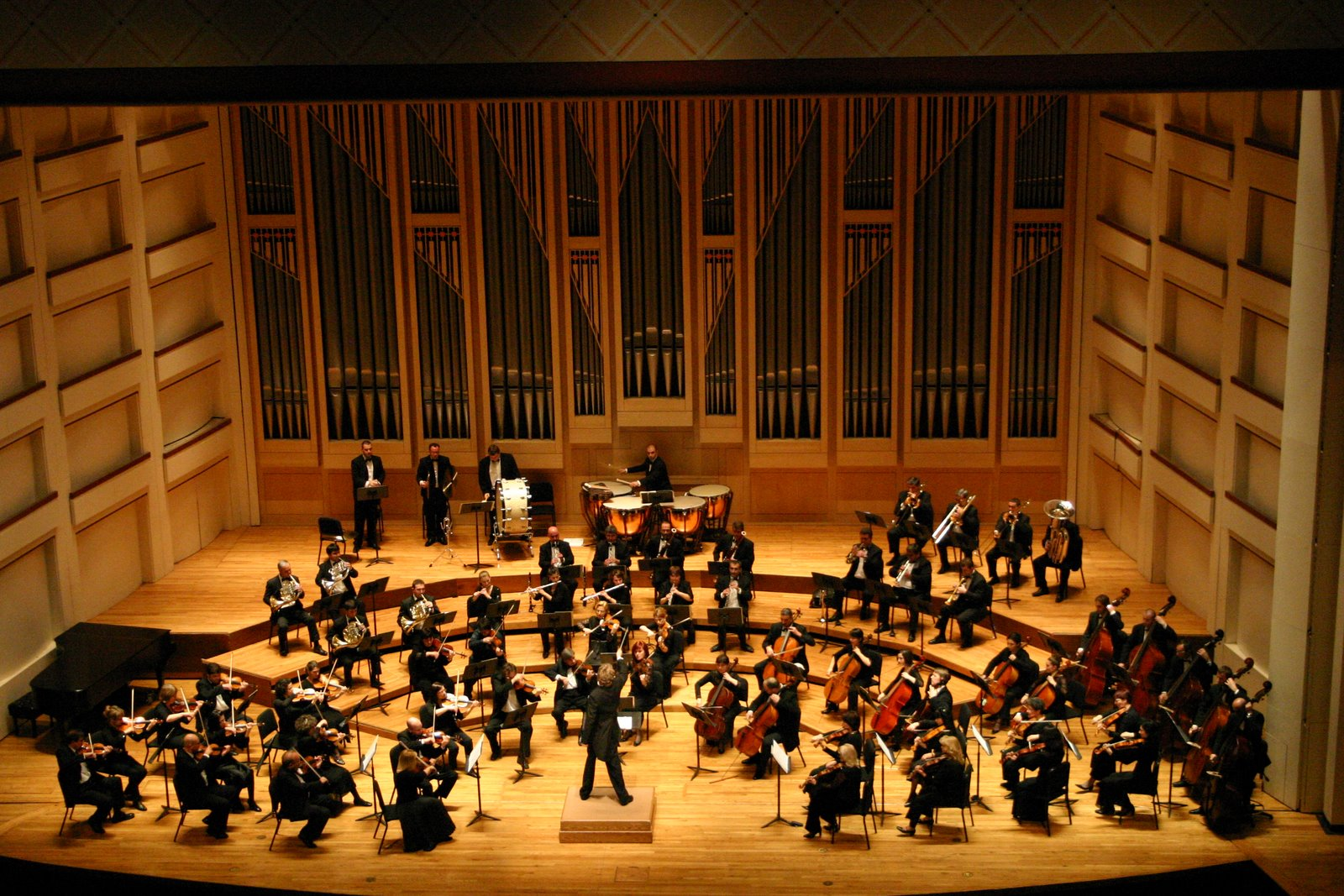
The symphony orchestra is not only the main large ensemble used in classical music; one work for orchestra, Beethoven's Ninth Symphony has been called the supreme masterpiece of the Western canon.

In the pre-modern tradition, the aesthetics of music or musical aesthetics explored the mathematical and cosmological dimensions of rhythmic and harmonic organization. In the eighteenth century, focus shifted to the experience of hearing music, and thus to questions about its beauty and human enjoyment (plaisir and jouissance) of music. The origin of this philosophic shift is sometimes attributed to Baumgarten in the 18th century, followed by Kant. Through their writing, the ancient term aesthetics, meaning sensory perception, received its present-day connotation. In recent decades philosophers have tended to emphasize issues besides beauty and enjoyment. For example, music's capacity to express emotion has been a central issue.

Aesthetics is a sub-discipline of philosophy. In the 20th century, important contributions were made by Peter Kivy, Jerrold Levinson, Roger Scruton, and Stephen Davies. However, many musicians, music critics, and other non-philosophers have contributed to the aesthetics of music. In the 19th century, a significant debate arose between Eduard Hanslick, a music critic and musicologist, and composer Richard Wagner. Harry Partch and some other musicologists, such as Kyle Gann, have studied and tried to popularize microtonal music and the usage of alternate musical scales. Also, many modern composers like La Monte Young, Rhys Chatham and Glenn Branca paid much attention to a system of tuning called just intonation.

There has been a strong tendency in the aesthetics of music to emphasize the paramount importance of compositional structure; however, other issues concerning the aesthetics of music include lyricism, harmony, hypnotism, emotiveness, temporal dynamics, resonance, playfulness, and color (see also musical development).

It is often thought that music has the ability to affect our emotions, intellect, and psychology; it can assuage our loneliness or incite our passions. The philosopher Plato suggests in the Republic that music has a direct effect on the soul. Therefore, he proposes that in the ideal regime music would be closely regulated by the state (Book VII).

== See also ==
- Music education
- Music psychology
- Musicology
- Sonic philosophy
