= Craig Schuftan =

Craig Schuftan (born 1974) is an ARIA award-winning author, broadcaster, radio producer from Sydney, Australia. He is the author of three books (The Culture Club and Hey! Nietzsche! Leave Them Kids Alone!, and "Entertain Us!: The Rise and Fall of Alternative Rock in the Nineties").

Schuftan began volunteering at 2SER FM, which led to work at Triple J, first as a contributor to The Morning Show and later as a producer. He has worked with Richard Kingsmill (The J-Files), Chris Taylor and Craig Reucassel from The Chaser (Today Today and The Race Race), Roy & HG (This Sporting Life), Myf Warhurst, Jay Whalley and Lindsay McDougall (Myf, Jay & The Dr) and Sam Simmons (Sam Simmons’ Precise History of Things).

In 2002, Craig began presenting The Culture Club on Triple J, the ABC's national youth broadcaster. He also produces the comedy serials Space Goat and Battalion 666 for the station.

In 2007, Craig's first book, The Culture Club: Modern Art, Rock and Roll and other stuff your parents warned you about was published by ABC Books. His second book Hey! Nietzsche! Leave Them Kids Alone!: The Romantic Movement, Rock and Roll, and the End of Civilisation as We Know It was published April 2009. In late 2009 Craig worked as a guest curator on the Powerhouse Museum's The 80s Are Back exhibition. Craig launched his first zine From a Mess to the Masses in March 2010 and won his first ARIA (for best comedy release) in November 2010.

== Bibliography ==
- The Culture Club: Modern Art, Rock and Roll, and Other Things Your Parents Warned You About, 2007 ABC Books
- Hey! Nietzsche! Leave Them Kids Alone!: The Romantic Movement, Rock and Roll, and the End of Civilisation as We Know It, 2009, ABC Books
- Entertain Us!: The Rise and Fall of Alternative Rock in the Nineties, 2012, ABC Books

=== Translated editions ===
- De Culture Club, 2011 Uitgeverij De Passage (in Dutch)

== Sources & References ==
- 25 minutes interview on YouTube for art.afterhours
- bio about schuftan
- video interview on ABC
