= Stephen Davies (philosopher) =

American-New Zealand philosophy professor

Stephen John Davies is a Distinguished Professor of philosophy at the University of Auckland, New Zealand. He mainly writes on aesthetics, particularly the philosophy of music but also works on political philosophy. He is a past president of the American Society for Aesthetics (2007–2008), and the New Zealand division of the Australasian Association of Philosophy (2001).

== Work ==
One of Davies's first journal publications was 'The Expression of Emotion in Music', published in Mind in 1980 (Vol. 89, pp. 67–86). In this article Davies first outlined his theory that music is expressive of emotions in virtue of resembling the way that emotions appear. This literalist theory is similar to one outlined by Peter Kivy in his book The Corded Shell, also published in 1980. However, Davies developed his view independently as an undergraduate in the 1970s, and the theory was part of his PhD thesis awarded in 1976 from the University of London. In contrast to Kivy, Davies also places a greater emphasis on the resemblance between music and physical gesture, where Kivy tends to emphasize the resemblance to the expressive vocalisations. Davies was inspired when seeing an advertisement for Hush Puppies shoes, with the thought that we recognize sadness in the face of Basset hounds, despite knowing that they do not necessarily feel sad.

Davies also maintains a research interest in ethnomusicology, which he studied as an undergraduate, particularly the aesthetics of Balinese music.

In 2009, Davies was elected a Fellow of the Royal Society of New Zealand.

== Books ==
- Definitions of Art. Ithaca & London: Cornell University Press, 1991.
- Musical Meaning and Expression. Ithaca & London: Cornell University Press, 1994.
- Musical Works and Performances: A Philosophical Exploration. Oxford: Clarendon Press, 2001.
- Themes in the Philosophy of Music. Oxford: Oxford University Press, 2003.
- Philosophical Perspectives on Art. Oxford: Oxford University Press, 2007.
- Musical Understandings and Other Essays on the Philosophy of Music. Oxford: Oxford University Press, 2011.
- The Artful Species: Aesthetics, Art, and Evolution. Oxford: Oxford University Press, 2012.
- The Philosophy of Art. Chichester: Wiley-Blackwell, 2016. Second edition.* Adornment: What Self-Decoration Tells Us About Who We Are. London: Bloomsbury Academic, 2020.

== Edited books ==
- Art and Its Messages: Meaning, Morality, and Society. University Park: Pennsylvania State University Press, 1997.
- Art and Essence. Westport: Praeger, 2003. With A. C. Sukla.
- A Companion to Aesthetics. Malden: Wiley-Blackwell, 2009. Second edition. With K. Higgins, R. Hopkins, R. Stecker and D. E. Cooper.
