= Declarative knowledge =

Awareness of facts

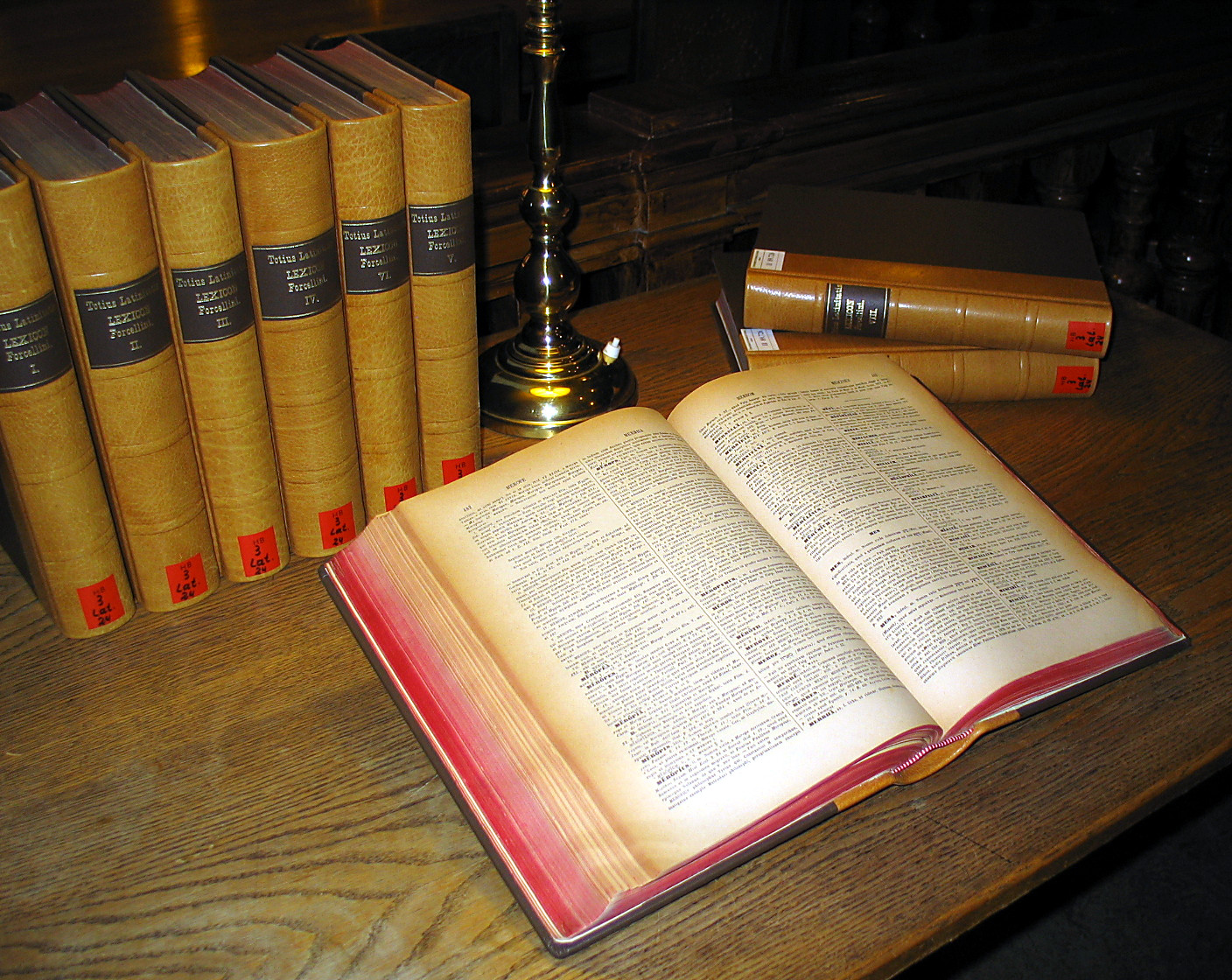
Declarative knowledge can be expressed using declarative sentences stored in books.

Declarative knowledge, also known as theoretical knowledge, descriptive knowledge, propositional knowledge, and knowledge-that, is an awareness of facts that can be expressed using declarative sentences. It is not restricted to one specific use or purpose and can be stored in books or on computers.

Epistemology is the main discipline studying declarative knowledge. Among other things, it studies the essential components of declarative knowledge. According to a traditionally influential view, it has three elements: it is a belief that is true and justified. As a belief, it is a subjective commitment to the accuracy of the believed claim while truth is an objective aspect. To be justified, a belief has to be rational by being based on good reasons. This means that mere guesses do not amount to knowledge even if they are true. In contemporary epistemology, additional or alternative components have been suggested. One proposal is that no contradicting evidence is present. Other suggestions are that the belief was caused by a reliable cognitive process and that the belief is infallible.

Types of declarative knowledge can be distinguished based on the source of knowledge, the type of claim that is known, and how certain the knowledge is. A central contrast is between a posteriori knowledge, which arises from experience, and a priori knowledge, which is grounded in pure rational reflection. Other classifications include domain-specific knowledge and general knowledge, knowledge of facts, concepts, and principles as well as explicit and implicit knowledge.

Declarative knowledge is often contrasted with practical knowledge and knowledge by acquaintance. Practical knowledge consists of skills, like knowing how to ride a horse. It is a form of non-intellectual knowledge since it does not need to involve true beliefs. Knowledge by acquaintance is a familiarity with something based on first-hand experience, like knowing the taste of chocolate. This familiarity can be present even if the person does not possess any factual information about the object. Some theorists also contrast declarative knowledge with conditional knowledge, prescriptive knowledge, structural knowledge, case knowledge, and strategic knowledge.

Declarative knowledge is required for various activities, such as labeling phenomena as well as describing and explaining them. It can guide the processes of problem-solving and decision-making. In many cases, its value is based on its usefulness in achieving one's goals. However, its usefulness is not always obvious and not all instances of declarative knowledge are valuable. Much knowledge taught at school is declarative knowledge. It is said to be stored as explicit memory and can be learned through rote memorization of isolated, singular, facts. But in many cases, it is advantageous to foster a deeper understanding that integrates the new information into wider structures and connects it to pre-existing knowledge. Sources of declarative knowledge are perception, introspection, memory, reasoning, and testimony.

== Definition and semantic field ==
Declarative knowledge is an awareness or understanding of facts. It can be expressed through spoken and written language using declarative sentences and can thus be acquired through verbal communication. Examples of declarative knowledge are knowing "that Princess Diana died in 1997" or "that Goethe was 83 when he finished writing Faust". Declarative knowledge involves mental representations in the form of concepts, ideas, theories, and general rules. Through these representations, the person stands in a relationship to a particular aspect of reality by depicting what it is like. Declarative knowledge tends to be context-independent: it is not tied to any specific use and may be employed for many tasks. It includes a wide range of phenomena and encompasses knowledge of individual facts and of general laws. An example for individual facts is knowing that the atomic mass of gold is 196.97 u. Knowing that the color of leaves of some trees changes in autumn, on the other hand, belongs to general laws. Due to its verbal nature, declarative knowledge can be stored in media like books and harddisks. It may also be processed using computers and plays a key role in various forms of artificial intelligence, for example, in the knowledge base of expert systems.

Terms like theoretical knowledge, descriptive knowledge, propositional knowledge, and knowledge-that are used as synonyms of declarative knowledge and express its different aspects. Theoretical knowledge is knowledge of what is the case, in the past, present, or future independent of a practical outlook concerning how to achieve a specific goal. Descriptive knowledge is knowledge that involves descriptions of actual or speculative objects, events, or concepts. Propositional knowledge asserts that a proposition or claim about the world is true. This is often expressed using a that-clause, as in "knowing that kangaroos hop" or "knowing that 2 + 2 = 4". For this reason, it is also referred to as knowledge-that. Declarative knowledge contrasts with non-declarative knowledge, which does not concern the explicit comprehension of factual information regarding the world. In this regard, practical knowledge in the form of skills and knowledge by acquaintance as a type of experiential familiarity are not forms of declarative knowledge. The main discipline investigating declarative knowledge is called epistemology. It tries to determine its nature, how it arises, what value it has, and what its limits are.

== Components ==
A central issue in epistemology is to determine the components or essential features of declarative knowledge. This field of inquiry is called the analysis of knowledge. It aims to provide the conditions that are individually necessary and jointly sufficient for a state to amount to declarative knowledge. In this regard, it is similar to how a chemist breaks down a sample by identifying all the chemical elements composing it.

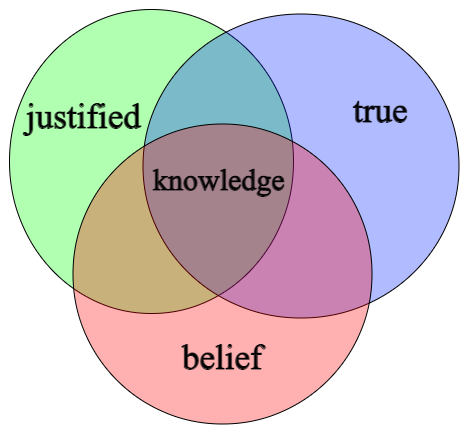
The main components traditionally associated with knowledge are belief, truth, and justification.

A traditionally influential view states that declarative knowledge has three essential features: it is (1) a belief that is (2) true and (3) justified. This position is referred to as the justified-true-belief theory of knowledge and is often seen as the standard view. This view faced significant criticism following a series of counterexamples given by Edmund Gettier in the latter half of the 20th century. In response, various alternative theories of the elements of declarative knowledge have been suggested. Some see justified true belief as a necessary condition that is not sufficient by itself and discuss additional components that are needed. Another response is to deny that justification is needed and seek a different component to replace it. Some theorists, like Timothy Williamson, reject the idea that declarative knowledge can be deconstructed into various constituent parts. They argue instead that it is a basic and unanalyzable epistemological state.

=== Belief ===
One commonly accepted component of knowledge is belief. In this sense, whoever knows that whales are animals automatically also believes that whales are animals. A belief is a mental state that affirms that something is the case. As an attitude toward a proposition, it belongs to the subjective side of knowledge. Some theorists, like Luis Villoro, distinguish between weak and strong beliefs. Having a weak belief implies that the person merely presumes that something is the case. They guess that the claim is probably correct while acknowledging at the same time that they might very well be mistaken about it. This contrasts with strong belief, which implies a substantial commitment to the believed claim. It involves certainty in the form of being sure about it. For declarative knowledge, this stronger sense of belief is relevant.

A few epistemologists, like Katalin Farkas, claim that, at least in some cases, knowledge is not a form of belief but a different type of mental state. One argument for this position is based on statements like "I don't believe it, I know it", which may be used to express that the person is very certain and has good reason to affirm this claim. However, this argument is not generally accepted since knowing something does not imply that the person disbelieves the claim. A further explanation is to hold that this statement is a linguistic tool to emphasize that the person is well-informed. In this regard, it only denies that a weak belief exists without rejecting that a stronger form of belief is involved.

=== Truth ===
Beliefs are either true or false depending on whether they accurately represent reality. Truth is usually seen as one of the essential components of knowledge. This means that it is impossible to know a claim that is false. For example, it is possible to believe that Hillary Clinton won the 2016 US Presidential election but nobody can know it because this event did not occur. That a proposition is true does not imply that it is common knowledge, that an irrefutable proof exists, or that someone is thinking about it. Instead, it only means that it presents things as they are. For example, when flipping a coin, it may be true that it will land heads even if it is not possible to predict this with certainty. Truth is an objective factor of knowledge that goes beyond the mental sphere of belief since it usually depends on what the world outside the person's mind is like.

Some epistemologists hold that there are at least some forms of knowledge that do not require truth. For example, Joseph Thomas Tolliver argues that some mental states amount to knowledge only because of the causes and effects they have. This is the case even if they do not represent anything and are therefore neither true nor false. A different outlook is found in the field of the anthropology of knowledge, which studies how knowledge is acquired, stored, retrieved, and communicated. In this discipline, knowledge is often understood in a very wide sense that is roughly equivalent to understanding and culture. In this regard, the main interest is usually about how people ascribe truth values to meaning-contents, like when affirming an assertion, independent of whether this assertion is true or false. Despite these positions, it is widely accepted in epistemology that truth is an essential component of declarative knowledge.

=== Justification ===
In epistemology, justification means that a claim is supported by evidence or that a person has good reasons for believing it. This implies some form of appraisal in relation to an evaluative standard of rationality. For example, a person who just checked their bank account and saw that their balance is 500 dollars has a good reason to believe that they have 500 dollars in their bank account. However, justification by itself does not imply that a belief is true. For example, if someone reads the time from their clock they may form a justified belief about the current time even if the clock stopped a while ago and shows a false time now. If a person has a justified belief then they are often able to articulate what this belief is and to provide arguments stating the reasons supporting it. However, this ability to articulate one's reasons is not an essential requirement of justification.

Justification is usually included as a component of knowledge to exclude lucky guesses. For example, a compulsive gambler flipping a coin may be certain that it will land heads this time without a good reason for this belief. In this case, the belief does not amount to knowledge even if it turns out that it was true. This observation can be easily explained by including justification as an essential component. This implies that the gambler's belief does not amount to knowledge because it lacks justification. In this regard, mere true opinion is not enough to establish knowledge. A central issue in epistemology concerns the standards of justification, i.e., what conditions have to be fulfilled for a belief to be justified. Internalists understand justification as a purely subjective component, akin to belief. They claim that a belief is justified if it stands in the right relation to other mental states of the believer. For example, perceptual experiences can justify beliefs about the perceived object. This contrasts with externalists, who claim that justification involves objective factors that are external to the person's mind. Such factors can include causal relations with the object of the belief or that reliable cognitive processes are responsible for the formation of the belief.

Foundationalism, coherentism, and infinitism are theories about how justification arises. The black arrows symbolize how one belief supports another belief.

A closely related issue concerns the question of how the different mental states have to be related to each other to be justified. For example, one belief may be supported by another belief. However, it is questionable whether this is sufficient for justification if the second belief is itself not justified. For example, a person may believe that Ford cars are cheaper than BMWs because they heard this from a friend. However, this belief may not be justified if there is no good reason to think that the friend is a reliable source of information. This can lead to an infinite regress since whatever reason is provided for the friend's reliability may itself lack justification. Three popular responses to this problem are foundationalism, coherentism, and infinitism. According to foundationalists, some reasons are foundational and do not depend on other reasons for their justification. Coherentists also reject the idea that an infinite chain of reasons is needed and argue that different beliefs can mutually support each other without one being more basic than the others. Infinitists, on the other hand, accept the idea that an infinite chain of reasons is required.

Many debates concerning the nature of declarative knowledge focus on the role of justification, specifically whether it is needed at all and what else might be needed to complement it. Influential in this regard was a series of thought experiments by Edmund Gettier. They present concrete cases of justified true beliefs that fail to amount to knowledge. The reason for their failure is a type of epistemic luck. This means that the justification is not relevant to whether the belief is true. In one thought experiment, Smith and Jones apply for a job and before officially declaring the result, the company president tells Smith that Jones will get the job. Smith saw that Jones has 10 coins in his pocket so he comes to form the justified belief that the successful candidate has 10 coins in his pocket. In the end, it turns out that Smith gets the job after all. By lucky coincidence, Smith also has 10 coins in his pocket. Gettier claims that, because of this coincidence, Smith's belief that the successful candidate has 10 coins in his pocket does not amount to knowledge. The belief is justified and true but the justification is not relevant to the truth.

=== Others ===
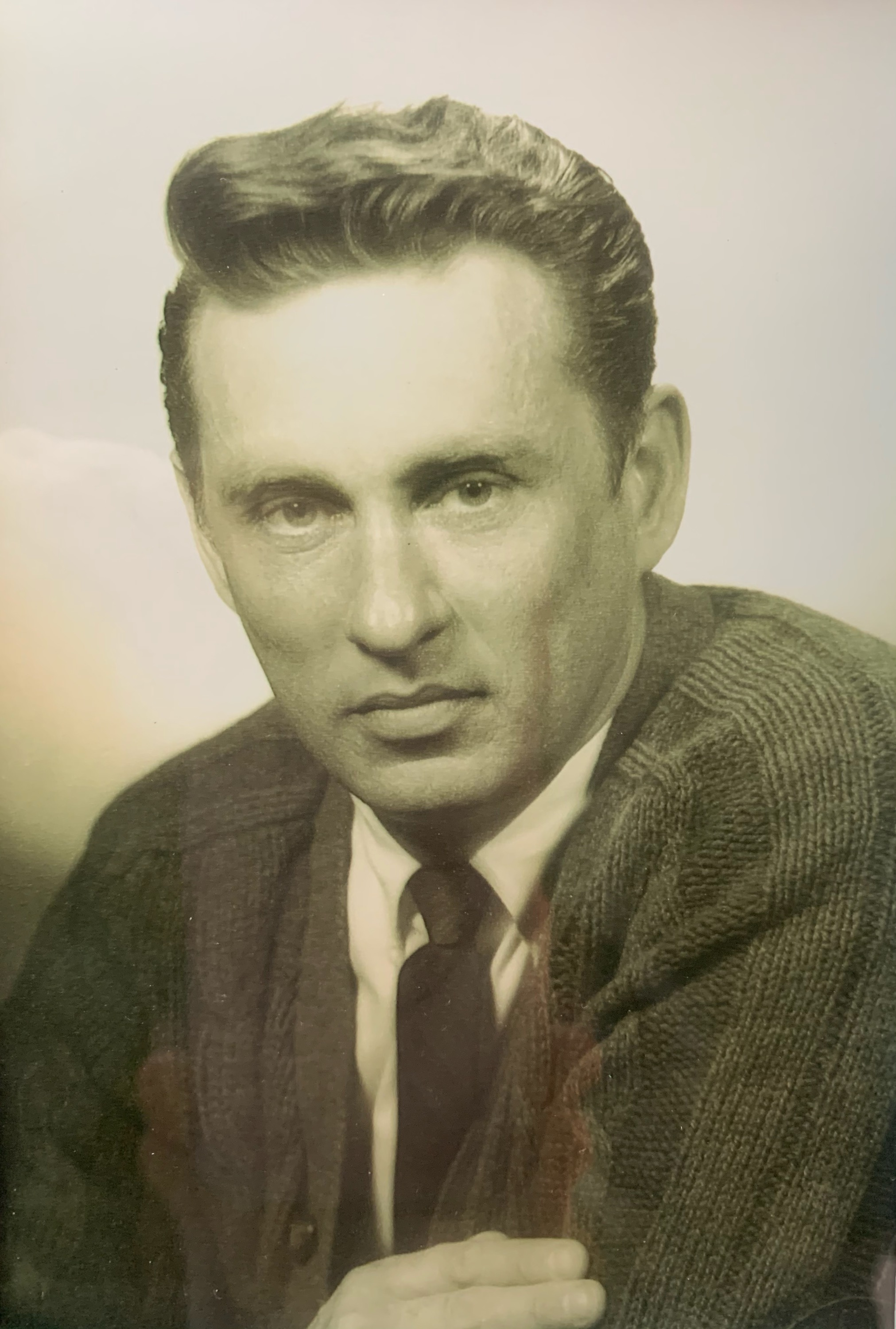
The thought experiments by Edmund Gettier influenced many epistemologists to seek additional components of declarative knowledge.

In response to Gettier's thought experiments, various further components of declarative knowledge have been suggested. Some of them are intended as additional elements besides belief, truth, and justification while others are understood as replacements for justification.

According to defeasibility theory, an additional factor besides having evidence in favor of the belief is that no defeating evidence is present. Defeating evidence of a belief is evidence that undermines the justification of the belief. For example, if a person looks outside the window and sees a rainbow then this impression justifies their belief that there is a rainbow. However, if the person just ate a psychedelic drug then this is defeating evidence since it undermines the reliability of their experiences. Defeasibility theorists claim that, in this case, the belief does not amount to knowledge because defeating evidence is present. As an additional component of knowledge, they require that the person has no defeating evidence of the belief. Some theorists demand the stronger requirement that there is no true proposition that would defeat the belief, independent of whether the person is aware of this proposition or not. A closely related theory holds that beliefs can only amount to knowledge if they are not inferred from a falsehood.

A further theory is based on the idea that knowledge states should be responsive to what the world is like. One suggested component in this regard is that the belief is safe or sensitive. This means that the person has the belief because it is true but that they would not hold the belief if it was false. In this regard, the person's belief tracks the state of the world.

Some theories do not try to provide additional requirements but instead propose replacing justification with alternative components. For example, according to some forms of reliabilism, a true belief amounts to knowledge if it was formed through a reliable cognitive process. A cognitive process is reliable if it produces mostly true beliefs in actual situations and would also do so in counterfactual situations. Examples of reliable processes are perception and reasoning. An outcome of reliabilism is that knowledge is not restricted to humans. The reason is that reliable belief-formation processes may also be present in other animals, like dogs, apes, or rats, even if they do not possess justification for their beliefs. Virtue epistemology is a closely related approach that understands knowledge as the manifestation of epistemic virtues. It agrees with regular forms of reliabilism that knowledge is not a matter of luck but puts additional emphasis on the evaluative aspect of knowledge and the underlying skills responsible for it.

According to causal theories of knowledge, a necessary element of knowing a fact is that this fact somehow caused the knowledge of it. This is the case, for example, if a belief about the color of a house is based on a perceptual experience, which causally connects the house to the belief. This causal connection does not have to be direct and can be mediated through steps like activating memories and drawing inferences.

In many cases, the goal of suggesting additional components is to avoid cases of epistemic luck. In this regard, some theorists have argued that the additional component would have to ensure that the belief is true. This approach is reflected in the idea that knowledge implies a form of certainty. But it sets the standards of knowledge very high and may require that a belief has to be infallible to amount to knowledge. This means that the justification ensures that the belief is true. For example, Richard Kirkham argues that the justification required for knowledge must be based on self-evident premises that deductively entail the held belief. Such a position leads to a form of skepticism about knowledge since the great majority of regular beliefs do not live up to these requirements. It would imply that people know very little and that most who claim to know a certain fact are mistaken. However, a more common view among epistemologists is that knowledge does not require infallibility and that many knowledge claims in everyday life are true.

== Types ==
Declarative knowledge arises in many forms. It is possible to distinguish between them based on the type of content of what is known. For example, empirical knowledge is knowledge of observable facts while conceptual knowledge is an understanding of general categorizations and theories as well as the relations between them. Other examples are ethical, religious, scientific, mathematical, and logical knowledge as well as self-knowledge. A further distinction focuses on the mode of how something is known. On a causal level, different sources of knowledge correspond to different types of declarative knowledge. Examples are knowledge through perception, introspection, memory, reasoning, and testimony.

On a logical level, forms of knowledge can be distinguished based on how a knowledge claim is supported by its premises. This classification corresponds to the different forms of logical reasoning, such as deductive and inductive reasoning. A closely related categorization focuses on the strength of the source of the justification. It distinguishes between probabilistic and apodictic knowledge. The distinction between a priori and a posteriori knowledge, on the other hand, focuses on the type of the source. These classifications overlap with each other at various points. For example, a priori knowledge is closely connected to apodictic, conceptual, deductive, and logical knowledge. A posteriori knowledge, on the other hand, is linked to probabilistic, empirical, inductive, and scientific knowledge. Self-knowledge may be identified with introspective knowledge.

The distinction between a priori and a posteriori knowledge is determined by the role of experience and matches the contrast between empirical and non-empirical knowledge. A posteriori knowledge is knowledge from experience. This means that experience, like regular perception, is responsible for its formation and justification. Knowing that the door of one's house is green is one example of a posteriori knowledge since some form of sensory observation is required. For a priori knowledge, on the other hand, no experience is required. It is based on pure rational reflection and can neither be verified nor falsified through experience. Examples are knowing that 7 + 5 = 12 or that whatever is red everywhere is not blue everywhere. In this context, experience means primarily sensory observation but can also include related processes, like introspection and memory. However, it does not include all conscious phenomena. For example, having a rational insight into the solution of a mathematical problem does not mean that the resulting knowledge is a posteriori. And knowing that 7 + 5 = 12 is a priori knowledge even though some form of consciousness is involved in learning what symbols like "7" and "+" mean and in becoming aware of the associated concepts.

One classification distinguishes between knowledge of facts, concepts, and principles. Knowledge of facts pertains to the association of concrete information, for example, that the red color on a traffic light means stop or that Christopher Columbus sailed in 1492 from Spain to America. Knowledge of concepts applies to more abstract and general ideas that group together many individual phenomena. For example, knowledge of the concept of jogging implies knowing how it differs from walking and running as well as being able to apply this concept to concrete cases. Knowledge of principles is an awareness of general patterns of cause and effect, including rules of thumb. It is a form of understanding how things work and being aware of the explanation of why something happened the way it did. Examples are that if there is lightning then there will be thunder or if a person robs a bank then they may go to jail. Similar classifications distinguish between declarative knowledge of persons, events, principles, maxims, and norms.

Declarative knowledge is traditionally identified with explicit knowledge and contrasted with tacit or implicit knowledge. Explicit knowledge is knowledge of which the person is aware and which can be articulated. It is stored in explicit memory. Implicit knowledge, on the other hand, is a form of embodied knowledge that the person cannot articulate. The traditional association of declarative knowledge with explicit knowledge is not always accepted in the contemporary literature. Some theorists argue that there are forms of implicit declarative knowledge. A putative example is a person who has learned a concept and is now able to correctly classify objects according to this concept even though they are not able to provide a verbal rationale for their decision.

A further contrast is between domain-specific and general knowledge. Domain-specific knowledge applies to a narrow subject or a particular task but is useless outside this focus. General knowledge, on the other hand, concerns wide topics or has general applications. For example, declarative knowledge of the rules of grammar belongs to general knowledge while having memorized the lines of the poem The Raven is domain-specific knowledge. This distinction is based on a continuum of cases that are more or less general without a clear-cut line between the types. According to Paul Kurtz, there are six types of descriptive knowledge: knowledge of available means, of consequences, of particular facts, of general causal laws, of established values, and of basic needs. Another classification distinguishes between structural knowledge and perceptual knowledge.

== Contrast with other forms of knowledge ==
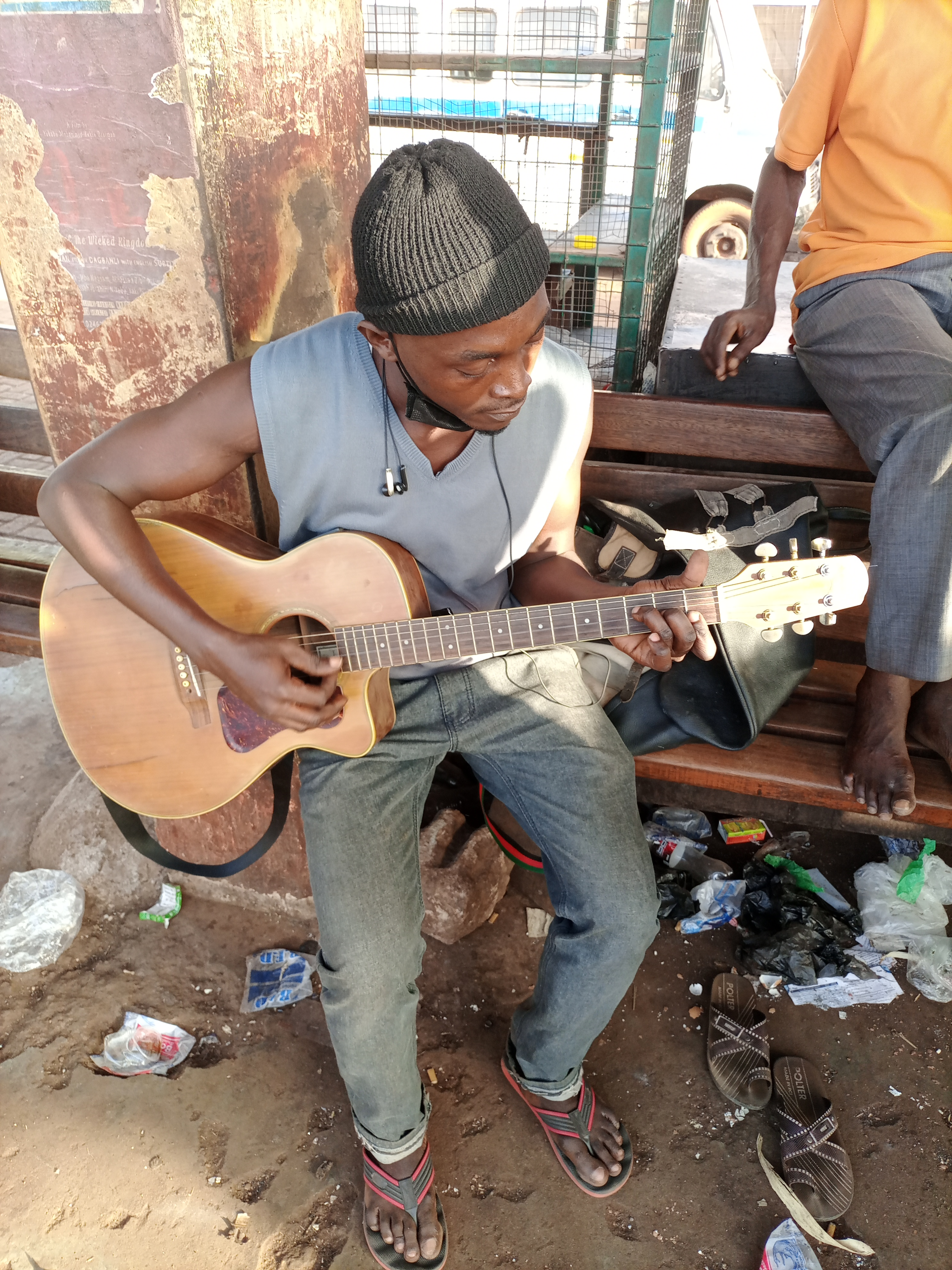
Knowing how to play the guitar is one form of non-declarative knowledge.

Declarative knowledge is often contrasted with other types of knowledge. A common classification in epistemology distinguishes it from practical knowledge (Note: A similar contrast is found in ancient Greek philosophy, which distinguishes between the theoretical epistēmē and the practical tékhnē.) and knowledge by acquaintance. All of them can be expressed with the verb "to know" but their differences are reflected in the grammatical structures used to articulate them. Declarative knowledge is usually expressed with a that-clause, as in "Ann knows that koalas sleep most of the time". For practical knowledge, a how-clause is used instead, for example, "Dave knows how to read the time on a clock". Knowledge by acquaintance can be articulated using a direct object without a preposition, as in "Emily knows Obama personally".

Practical knowledge consists of skills. Knowing how to ride a horse or how to play the guitar are forms of practical knowledge. The terms "procedural knowledge" and "knowledge-how" are often used as synonyms. It differs from declarative knowledge in various aspects. It is usually imprecise and cannot be proven by deducing it from premises. It is non-propositional and, for the most part, cannot be taught in abstract without concrete exercise. In this regard, it is a form of non-intellectual knowledge. It is tied to a specific goal and its value lies not in being true, but rather in how effective it is to accomplish its goal. Practical knowledge can be present without any beliefs and may even involve false beliefs. For example, an experienced ball player may know how to catch a ball despite having false beliefs. They may believe that their eyes continuously track the ball. But, in truth, their eyes perform a series of abrupt movements that anticipate the ball's trajectory rather than following it. Another difference is that declarative knowledge is commonly only ascribed to animals with highly developed minds, like humans. Practical knowledge, on the other hand, is more prevalent in the animal kingdom. For example, ants know how to walk through the kitchen despite presumably lacking the mental capacity for the declarative knowledge that they are walking through the kitchen.

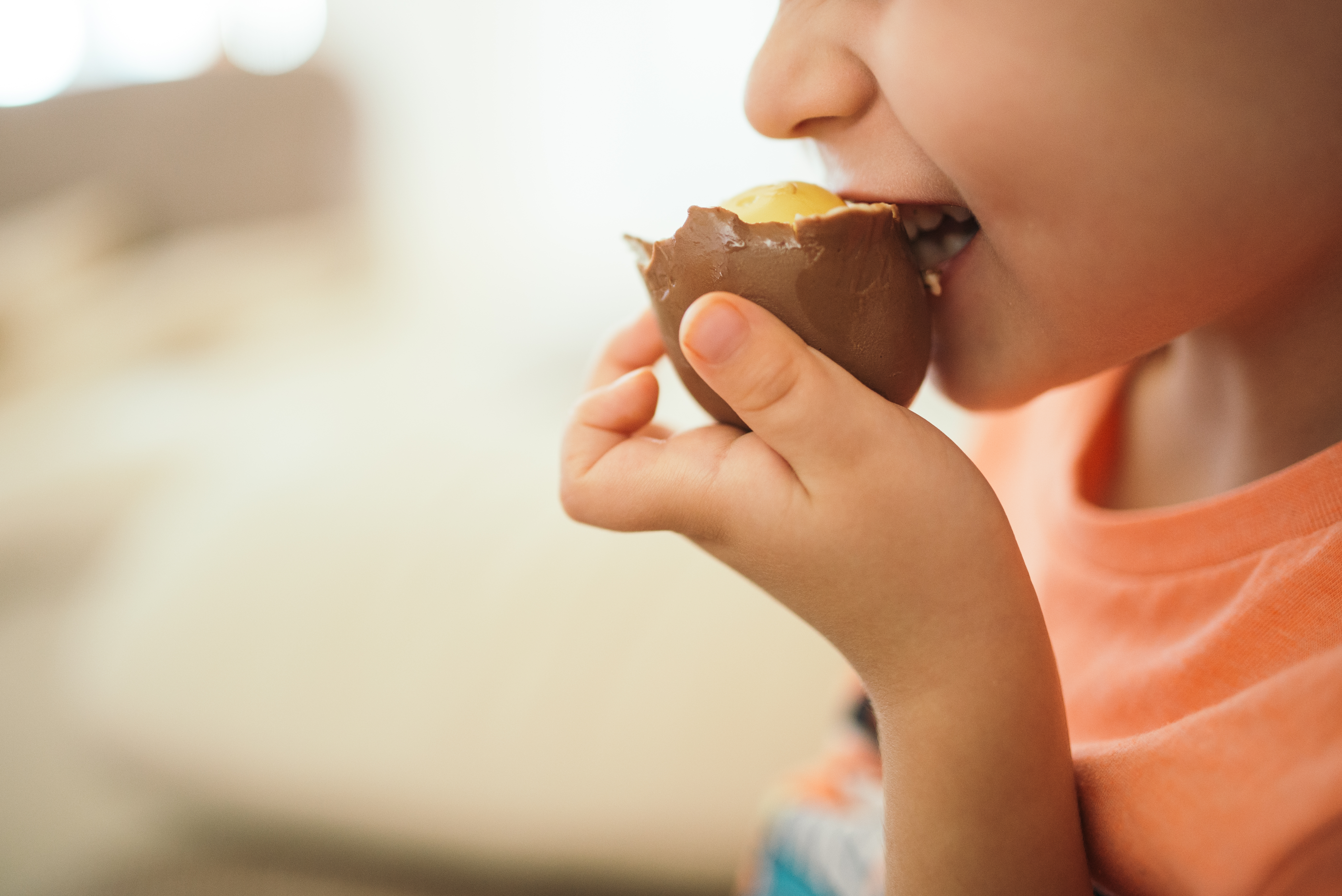
Familiarity with the flavor of chocolate is one example of knowledge by acquaintance, which belongs to non-declarative knowledge.

Declarative knowledge is also different from knowledge by acquaintance, which is also known as objectual knowledge, and knowledge-of. Knowledge by acquaintance is a form of familiarity or direct awareness that a person has with another person, a thing, or a place. For example, a person who has tasted the flavor of chocolate knows chocolate in this sense, just like a person who visited Lake Taupō knows Lake Taupō. Knowledge by acquaintance does not imply that the person can provide factual information about the object. It is a form of non-inferential knowledge that depends on first-hand experience. For example, a person who has never left their home country may acquire much declarative knowledge about other countries by reading books without any knowledge by acquaintance.

Knowledge by acquaintance plays a central role in the epistemology of Bertrand Russell. He holds that it is more basic than other forms of knowledge since to understand a proposition, one has to be acquainted with its constituents. According to Russell, knowledge by acquaintance covers a wide range of phenomena, such as thoughts, feelings, desires, memory, introspection, and sense data. It can happen in relation to particular things and universals. Knowledge of physical objects, on the other hand, belongs to declarative knowledge, which he calls knowledge by description. It also has a central role to play since it extends the realm of knowledge to things that lie beyond the personal sphere of experience.

Some theorists, like Anita Woolfolk et al., contrast declarative knowledge and procedural knowledge with conditional knowledge. According to this view, conditional knowledge is about knowing when and why to use declarative and procedural knowledge. For many issues, like solving math problems and learning a foreign language, it is not sufficient to know facts and general procedures if the person does not know under which situations to use them. To master a language, for example, it is not enough to acquire declarative knowledge of verb forms if one lacks conditional knowledge of when it is appropriate to use them. Some theorists understand conditional knowledge as one type of declarative knowledge and not as a distinct category.

A further distinction is between declarative or descriptive knowledge in contrast to prescriptive knowledge. Descriptive knowledge represents what the world is like. It describes and classifies what phenomena are there and in what relations they stand toward each other. It is interested in what is true independently of what people want. Prescriptive knowledge is not about what things actually are like but what they should be like. This concerns specifically the question of what purposes people should follow and how they should act. It guides action by showing what people should do to fulfill their needs and desires. In this regard, it has a more subjective component since it depends on what people want. Some theorists equate prescriptive knowledge with procedural knowledge. But others distinguish them based on the claim that prescriptive knowledge is about what should be done while procedural knowledge is about how to do it. Other classifications contrast declarative knowledge with structural knowledge, meta knowledge, heuristic knowledge, control knowledge, case knowledge, and strategic knowledge.

Some theorists argue that one type of knowledge is more basic than others. For example, Robert E. Haskell claims that declarative knowledge is the basic form of knowledge since it constitutes a general framework of understanding. According to him, it is a precondition for acquiring other forms of knowledge. However, this position is not generally accepted and philosophers like Gilbert Ryle defend the opposing thesis that declarative knowledge presupposes procedural knowledge.

== Value ==
Declarative knowledge plays a central role in human understanding of the world. It underlies activities such as labeling phenomena, describing them, explaining them, and communicating with others about them. The value of declarative knowledge depends in part on its usefulness in helping people achieve their objectives. For example, to treat a disease, knowledge of its symptoms and possible cures is beneficial. Or if a person has applied for a new job then knowing where and when the interview takes place is important. Due to its context-independence, declarative knowledge can be used for a great variety of tasks and because of its compact nature, it can be easily stored and retrieved. Declarative knowledge can be useful for procedural knowledge, for example, by knowing the list of steps needed to execute a skill. It also has a key role in understanding and solving problems and can guide the process of decision-making. A related issue in the field of epistemology concerns the question of whether declarative knowledge is more valuable than true belief. This is not obvious since, for many purposes, true belief is as useful as knowledge to achieve one's goals.

Declarative knowledge is primarily desired in cases where it is immediately useful. But not all forms of knowledge are useful. For example, indiscriminately memorizing phone numbers found in a foreign phone book is unlikely to result in useful declarative knowledge. However, it is often difficult to assess the value of knowledge if one does not foresee a situation where it would be useful. In this regard, it can happen that the value of apparently useless knowledge is only discovered much later. For example, Maxwell's equations linking magnetism to electricity were considered useless at the time of discovery until experimental scientists discovered how to detect electromagnetic waves. Occasionally, knowledge may have a negative value, for example, when it hinders someone to do what would be needed because their knowledge of associated dangers paralyzes them.

== Learning ==
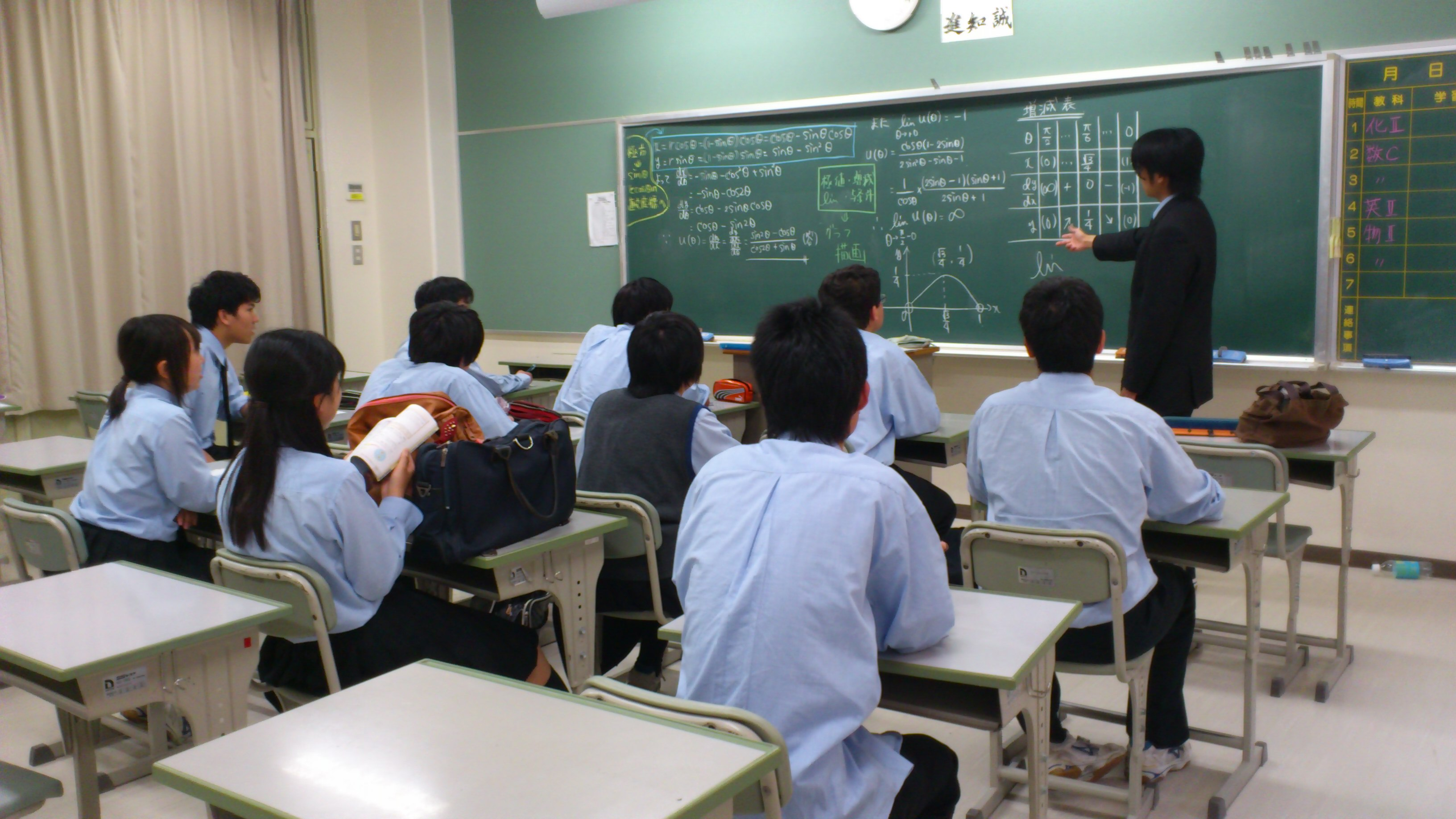
Much knowledge taught at school is declarative knowledge.

The value of knowledge is specifically relevant in the field of education. It is needed to decide which of the vast amount of knowledge should become part of the curriculum to be passed on to students. Many types of learning at school involve the acquisition of declarative knowledge. One form of declarative knowledge learning is so-called rote learning. It is a memorization technique in which the claim to be learned is repeated again and again until it is fully memorized. Other forms of declarative knowledge learning focus more on developing an understanding of the subject. This means that the learner should not only be able to repeat the claim but also to explain, describe, and summarize it. For declarative knowledge to be useful, it is often advantageous if it is embedded in a meaningful structure. For example, learning about new concepts and ideas involves developing an understanding of how they are related to each other and to what is already known.

According to Ellen Gagné, learning declarative knowledge happens in four steps. In the first step, the learner comes into contact with the material to be learned and apprehends it. Next, they translate this information into propositions. Following that, the learner's memory triggers and activates related propositions. As the last step, new connections are established and inferences are drawn. A similar process is described by John V. Dempsey, who stresses that the new information must be organized, divided, and linked to existing knowledge. He distinguishes between learning that involves recalling information in contrast to learning that only requires being able to recognize patterns. A related theory is defended by Anthony J. Rhem. He holds that the process of learning declarative knowledge involves organizing new information into groups. Next, links between the groups are drawn and the new information is connected to pre-existing knowledge.

Some theorists, like Robert Gagné and Leslie Briggs, distinguish between types of declarative knowledge learning based on the cognitive processes involved: learning of labels and names, of facts and lists, and of organized discourse. Learning labels and names requires forming a mental connection between two elements. Examples include memorizing foreign vocabulary and learning the capital city of each state. Learning facts involves relationships between concepts, for example, that "Ann Richards was the governor of Texas in 1991". This process is usually easier if the person is not dealing with isolated facts but possesses a network of information into which the new fact is integrated. The case for learning lists is similar since it involves the association of many items. Learning organized discourse encompasses not discrete facts or items but a wider comprehension of the meaning present in an extensive body of information.

Various sources of declarative knowledge are discussed in epistemology. They include perception, introspection, memory, reasoning, and testimony. Perception is usually understood as the main source of empirical knowledge. It is based on the senses, like seeing that it is raining when looking out the window. Introspection is similar to perception but provides knowledge of the internal sphere and not of external objects. An example is directing one's attention to a pain in one's toe to assess whether it has intensified.

Memory differs from perception and introspection in that it does not produce new knowledge but merely stores and retrieves pre-existing knowledge. As such, it depends on other sources. It is similar to reasoning in this regard, which starts from a known fact and arrives at new knowledge by drawing inferences from it. Empiricists hold that this is the only way how reason can arrive at knowledge while rationalists contend that some claims can be known by pure reason independent of additional sources. Testimony is different from the other sources since it does not have its own cognitive faculty. Rather, it is grounded in the notion that people can acquire knowledge through communication with others, for example, by speaking to someone or by reading a newspaper. Some religious philosophers include religious experiences (through the so-called sensus divinitatis) as a source of knowledge of the divine. However, such claims are controversial.
