= Definitions of knowledge =

Definitions of knowledge aim to identify the essential features of knowledge. Closely related terms are conception of knowledge, theory of knowledge, and analysis of knowledge. Some general features of knowledge are widely accepted among philosophers, for example, that it involves cognitive success and epistemic contact with reality. Despite extensive study, disagreements about the nature of knowledge persist, in part because researchers use diverging methodologies, seek definitions for distinct purposes, and have differing intuitions about the standards of knowledge.

An often-discussed definition asserts that knowledge is justified true belief. Justification means that the belief fulfills certain norms like being based on good reasons or being the product of a reliable cognitive process. This approach seeks to distinguish knowledge from mere true beliefs that arise from superstition, lucky guesses, or flawed reasoning. Critics of the justified-true-belief view, like Edmund Gettier, have proposed counterexamples to show that some justified true beliefs do not amount to knowledge if the justification is not genuinely connected to the truth, a condition termed epistemic luck.

In response, some philosophers have expanded the justified-true-belief definition with additional criteria intended to avoid these counterexamples. Suggested criteria include that the known fact caused the belief, that the belief manifests a cognitive virtue, that the belief is not inferred from a falsehood, and that the justification cannot be undermined. However, not all philosophers agree that such modifications are successful. Some propose a radical reconceptualization or hold that knowledge is a unique state not definable as a combination of other states.

Most definitions seek to understand the features of propositional knowledge, which is theoretical knowledge of a fact that can be expressed through a declarative that-clause, such as "knowing that Dave is at home". Other definitions focus on practical knowledge and knowledge by acquaintance. Practical knowledge concerns the ability to do something, like knowing how to swim. Knowledge by acquaintance is a familiarity with something based on experiential contact, like knowing the taste of chocolate.

== General characteristics and disagreements ==
Definitions of knowledge try to describe the essential features of knowledge. This includes clarifying the distinction between knowing something and not knowing it, for example, pointing out what is the difference between knowing that smoking causes cancer and not knowing this. Sometimes the expressions "conception of knowledge", "theory of knowledge", and "analysis of knowledge" are used as synonyms. Various general features of knowledge are widely accepted. For example, it can be understood as a form of cognitive success or epistemic contact with reality, and propositional knowledge may be characterized as "believing a true proposition in a good way". However, such descriptions are too vague to be very useful without further clarifications of what "cognitive success" means, what type of success is involved, or what constitutes "good ways of believing".

The disagreements about the nature of knowledge are both numerous and deep. Some of these disagreements stem from the fact that there are different ways of defining a term, both in relation to the goal one intends to achieve and concerning the method used to achieve it. These difficulties are further exacerbated by the fact that the term "knowledge" has historically been used for a great range of diverse phenomena. These phenomena include theoretical know-that, as in knowing that Paris is in France, practical know-how, as in knowing how to swim, and knowledge by acquaintance, as in personally knowing a celebrity. It is not clear that there is one underlying essence to all of these forms. For this reason, most definitions restrict themselves either explicitly or implicitly to knowledge-that, also termed "propositional knowledge", which is seen as the most paradigmatic type of knowledge.

Even when restricted to propositional knowledge, the differences between the various definitions are usually substantial. For this reason, the choice of one's conception of knowledge matters for questions like whether a particular mental state constitutes knowledge, whether knowledge is fairly common or quite rare, and whether there is knowledge at all. The problem of the definition and analysis of knowledge has been a subject of intense discussion within epistemology both in the 20th and the 21st century. The branch of philosophy studying knowledge is called epistemology.

=== Goals ===
An important reason for these disagreements is that different theorists often have very different goals in mind when trying to define knowledge. Some definitions are based mainly on the practical concern of being able to find instances of knowledge. For such definitions to be successful, it is not required that they identify all and only its necessary features. In many cases, easily identifiable contingent features can even be more helpful for the search than precise but complicated formulas. On the theoretical side, on the other hand, there are so-called real definitions that aim to grasp the term's essence in order to understand its place on the conceptual map in relation to other concepts. Real definitions are preferable on the theoretical level since they are very precise. However, it is often very hard to find a real definition that avoids all counterexamples. Real definitions usually presume that knowledge is a natural kind, like "human being" or "water" and unlike "candy" or "large plant". Natural kinds are clearly distinguishable on the scientific level from other phenomena. As a natural kind, knowledge may be understood as a specific type of mental state. In this regard, the term "analysis of knowledge" is used to indicate that one seeks different components that together make up propositional knowledge, usually in the form of its essential features or as the conditions that are individually necessary and jointly sufficient. This may be understood in analogy to a chemist analyzing a sample to discover its chemical compositions in the form of the elements involved in it. In most cases, the proposed features of knowledge apply to many different instances. However, the main difficulty for such a project is to avoid all counterexamples, i.e. there should be no instances that escape the analysis, not even in hypothetical thought experiments. By trying to avoid all possible counterexamples, the analysis of aims at arriving at a necessary truth about knowledge.

However, the assumption that knowledge is a natural kind that has precisely definable criteria is not generally accepted and some hold that the term "knowledge" refers to a merely conventional accomplishment that is artificially constituted and approved by society. In this regard, it may refer to a complex situation involving various external and internal aspects. This distinction is significant because if knowledge is not a natural kind then attempts to provide a real definition would be futile from the start even though definitions based merely on how the word is commonly used may still be successful. However, the term would not have much general scientific importance except for linguists and anthropologists studying how people use language and what they value. Such usage may differ radically from one culture to another. Many epistemologists have accepted, often implicitly, that knowledge has a real definition. But the inability to find an acceptable real definition has led some to understand knowledge in more conventionalist terms.

=== Methods ===
Besides these differences concerning the goals of defining knowledge, there are also important methodological differences regarding how one arrives at and justifies one's definition. One approach simply consists in looking at various paradigmatic cases of knowledge to determine what they all have in common. However, this approach is faced with the problem that it is not always clear whether knowledge is present in a particular case, even in paradigmatic cases. This leads to a form of circularity, known as the problem of the criterion: criteria of knowledge are needed to identify individual cases of knowledge and cases of knowledge are needed to learn what the criteria of knowledge are. Two approaches to this problem have been suggested: methodism and particularism. Methodists put their faith in their pre-existing intuitions or hypotheses about the nature of knowledge and use them to identify cases of knowledge. Particularists, on the other hand, hold that our judgments about particular cases are more reliable and use them to arrive at the general criteria. A closely related method, based more on the linguistic level, is to study how the word "knowledge" is used. However, there are numerous meanings ascribed to the term, many of which correspond to the different types of knowledge. This introduces the additional difficulty of first selecting the expressions belonging to the intended type before analyzing their usage.

=== Standards of knowledge ===
A further source of disagreement and difficulty in defining of knowledge is posed by the fact that there are many different standards of knowledge. The term "standard of knowledge" refers to how high the requirements are for ascribing knowledge to someone. To claim that a belief amounts to knowledge is to attribute a special epistemic status to this belief. But exactly what status this is, i.e. what standard a true belief has to pass to amount to knowledge, may differ from context to context. While some theorists use very high standards, like infallibility or absence of cognitive luck, others use very low standards by claiming that mere true belief is sufficient for knowledge, that justification is not necessary. For example, according to some standards, having read somewhere that the Solar System has eight planets is a sufficient justification for knowing this fact. According to others, a deep astronomical understanding of the relevant measurements and the precise definition of "planet" is necessary. In the history of philosophy, various theorists have set an even higher standard and assumed that certainty or infallibility is necessary. For example, this is René Descartes's approach, who aims to find absolutely certain or indubitable first principles to act as the foundation of all subsequent knowledge. However, this outlook is uncommon in the contemporary approach. Contextualists have argued that the standards depend on the context in which the knowledge claim is made. For example, in a low-stake situation, a person may know that the Solar System has 8 planets, even though the same person lacks this knowledge in a high-stake situation.

The question of the standards of knowledge is highly relevant to how common or rare knowledge is. According to the standards of everyday discourse, ordinary cases of perception and memory lead to knowledge. In this sense, even small children and animals possess knowledge. But according to a more rigorous conception, they do not possess knowledge since much higher standards need to be fulfilled. The standards of knowledge are also central to the question of whether skepticism, i.e. the thesis that we have no knowledge at all, is true. If very high standards are used, like infallibility, then skepticism becomes plausible. In this case, the skeptic only has to show that any putative knowledge state lacks absolute certainty, that while the actual belief is true, it could have been false. However, the more these standards are weakened to how the term is used in everyday language, the less plausible skepticism becomes.

== Justified true belief ==
Many philosophers define knowledge as justified true belief (JTB). This definition characterizes knowledge in relation to three essential features: S knows that p if and only if (1) p is true, (2) S believes that p, and (3) this belief is justified. A version of this definition was considered and rejected by Socrates in Plato's Theaetetus. Today, there is wide, though not universal, agreement among analytic philosophers that the first two criteria are correct, i.e., that knowledge implies true belief. Most of the controversy concerns the role of justification: what it is, whether it is needed, and what additional requirements it has to fulfill.

=== Truth ===
There is wide agreement that knowledge implies truth. In this regard, one cannot know things that are not true even if the corresponding belief is justified and rational. As an example, nobody can know that Winston Churchill won the 1996 US Presidential election, since this was not the result of the election. This reflects the idea that knowledge is a relation through which a person stands in cognitive contact with reality. This contact implies that the known proposition is true.

Nonetheless, some theorists have also proposed that truth may not always be necessary for knowledge. In this regard, a justified belief that is widely held within a community may be seen as knowledge even if it is false. Another doubt is due to some cases in everyday discourse where the term is used to express a strong conviction. For example, a strong supporter of Hillary Clinton might claim that they "knew" she would win the 2016 US presidential election. But such examples have not convinced many theorists. Instead, this claim is probably better understood as an exaggeration than as an actual knowledge claim. Such doubts are minority opinions and most theorists accept that knowledge implies truth.

=== Belief ===
Knowledge is usually understood as a form of belief: to know something implies that one believes it. This means that the agent accepts the proposition in question. However, not all theorists agree with this. This rejection is often motivated by contrasts found in ordinary language suggesting that the two are mutually exclusive, as in "I do not believe that; I know it." Some see this difference in the strength of the agent's conviction by holding that belief is a weak affirmation while knowledge entails a strong conviction. However, the more common approach to such expressions is to understand them not literally but through paraphrases, for example, as "I do not merely believe that; I know it." This way, the expression is compatible with seeing knowledge as a form of belief. A more abstract counterargument defines "believing" as "thinking with assent" or as a "commitment to something being true" and goes on to show that this applies to knowledge as well. A different approach, sometimes termed "knowledge first", upholds the difference between belief and knowledge based on the idea that knowledge is unanalyzable and therefore cannot be understood in terms of the elements that compose it. But opponents of this view may simply reject it by denying that knowledge is unanalyzable. So despite the mentioned arguments, there is still wide agreement that knowledge is a form of belief.

A few epistemologists hold that true belief by itself is sufficient for knowledge. However, this view is not very popular and most theorists accept that merely true beliefs do not constitute knowledge. This is based on various counterexamples, in which a person holds a true belief in virtue of faulty reasoning or a lucky guess.

=== Justification ===
The third component of the JTB definition is justification. It is based on the idea that having a true belief is not sufficient for knowledge, that knowledge implies more than just being right about something. So beliefs based on dogmatic opinions, blind guesses, or erroneous reasoning do not constitute knowledge even if they are true. For example, if someone believes that Machu Picchu is in Peru because both expressions end with the letter u, this true belief does not constitute knowledge. In this regard, a central question in epistemology concerns the additional requirements for turning a true belief into knowledge. There are many suggestions and deep disagreements within the academic literature about what these additional requirements are. A common approach is to affirm that the additional requirement is justification. So true beliefs that are based on good justification constitute knowledge, as when the belief about Machu Picchu is based on the individual's vivid recent memory of traveling through Peru and visiting Machu Picchu there. This line of thought has led many theorists to the conclusion that knowledge is nothing but true belief that is justified.

However, it has been argued that some knowledge claims in everyday discourse do not require justification. For example, when a teacher is asked how many of his students knew that Vienna is the capital of Austria in their last geography test, he may just cite the number of correct responses given without concern for whether these responses were based on justified beliefs. Some theorists characterize this type of knowledge as "lightweight knowledge" in order to exclude it from their discussion of knowledge.

A further question in this regard is how strong the justification needs to be for a true belief to amount to knowledge. So when the agent has some weak evidence for a belief, it may be reasonable to hold that belief even though no knowledge is involved. Some theorists hold that the justification has to be certain or infallible. This means that the justification of the belief guarantees the belief's truth, similar to how in a deductive argument, the truth of its premises ensures the truth of its conclusion. However, this view severely limits the extension of knowledge to very few beliefs, if any. Such a conception of justification threatens to lead to a full-blown skepticism denying that we know anything at all. The more common approach in the contemporary discourse is to allow fallible justification that makes the justified belief rationally convincing without ensuring its truth. This is similar to how ampliative arguments work, in contrast to deductive arguments. The problem with fallibilism is that the strength of justification comes in degrees: the evidence may make it somewhat likely, quite likely, or extremely likely that the belief is true. This poses the question of how strong the justification needs to be in the case of knowledge. The required degree may also depend on the context: knowledge claims in low-stakes situations, such as among drinking buddies, have lower standards than knowledge claims in high-stakes situations, such as among experts in the academic discourse.

==== Internalism and externalism ====
Besides the issue about the strength of justification, there is also the more general question about its nature. Theories of justification are often divided into internalism and externalism depending on whether only factors internal to the subject are responsible for justification. Commonly, an internalist conception is defended. This means that internal mental states of the subject justify beliefs. These states are usually understood as reasons or evidence possessed, like perceptual experiences, memories, rational intuition, or other justified beliefs.

One particular form of this position is evidentialism, which bases justification exclusively on the possession of evidence. It can be expressed by the claim that "Person S is justified in believing proposition p at time t if and only if S's evidence for p at t supports believing p". Some philosophers stipulate as an additional requirement to the possession of evidence that the belief is actually based on this evidence, i.e. that there is some kind of mental or causal link between the evidence and belief. This is often referred to as "doxastic justification". In contrast to this, having sufficient evidence for a true belief but coming to hold this belief based on superstition is a case of mere "propositional justification". Such a belief may not amount to knowledge even though the relevant evidence is possessed. A particularly strict version of internalism is access internalism. It holds that only states introspectively available to the subject's experience are relevant to justification. This means that deep unconscious states cannot act as justification. A closely related issue concerns the question of the internal structure of these states or how they are linked to each other. According to foundationalists, some mental states constitute basic reasons that can justify without being themselves in need of justification. Coherentists defend a more egalitarian position: what matters is not a privileged epistemic status of some special states but the relation to all other states. This means that a belief is justified if it fits into the person's full network of beliefs as a coherent part.

Philosophers have commonly espoused an internalist conception of justification. Various problems with internalism have led some contemporary philosophers to modify the internalist account of knowledge by using externalist conceptions of justification. Externalists include factors external to the person as well, such as the existence of a causal relation to the believed fact or to a reliable belief formation process. A prominent theory in this field is reliabilism, the theory that a true belief is justified if it was brought about by a reliable cognitive process that is likely to result in true beliefs. On this view, a true belief based on standard perceptual processes or good reasoning constitutes knowledge. But this is not the case if wishful thinking or emotional attachment is the cause.

However, not all externalists understand their theories as versions of the JTB account of knowledge. Some theorists defend an externalist conception of justification while others use a narrow notion of "justification" and understand externalism as implying that justification is not required for knowledge, for example, that the feature of being produced by a reliable process is not a form of justification but its surrogate. The same ambiguity is also found in the causal theory of knowledge.

=== In ancient philosophy ===
In Plato's Theaetetus, Socrates considers a number of theories as to what knowledge is, first excluding merely true belief as an adequate account. For example, an ill person with no medical training, but with a generally optimistic attitude, might believe that he will recover from his illness quickly. Nevertheless, even if this belief turned out to be true, the patient would not have known that he would get well since his belief lacked justification. The last account that Plato considers is that knowledge is true belief "with an account" that explains or defines it in some way. According to Edmund Gettier, the view that Plato is describing here is that knowledge is justified true belief. The truth of this view would entail that in order to know that a given proposition is true, one must not only believe the relevant true proposition, but must also have a good reason for doing so. One implication of this would be that no one would gain knowledge just by believing something that happened to be true.

== Gettier problem and cognitive luck ==
The JTB definition of knowledge was already rejected in Plato's Theaetetus. The JTB definition came under severe criticism in the 20th century, mainly due to a series of counterexamples given by Edmund Gettier. This is commonly known as the Gettier problem and includes cases in which a justified belief is true because of lucky circumstances, i.e. where the person's reason for the belief is irrelevant to its truth. A well-known example involves a person driving along a country road with many barn facades. The driver does not know this and finally stops in front of the only real barn. The idea of this case is that they have a justified true belief that the object in front of them is a barn even though this does not constitute knowledge. The reason is that it was just a lucky coincidence that they stopped here and not in front of one of the many fake barns, in which case they wouldn't have been able to tell the difference either.

This and similar counterexamples aim to show that justification alone is not sufficient, i.e. that there are some justified true beliefs that do not amount to knowledge. A common explanation of such cases is based on cognitive or epistemic luck. The idea is that it is a lucky coincidence or a fortuitous accident that the justified belief is true. So the justification is in some sense faulty, not because it relies on weak evidence, but because the justification is not responsible for the belief's truth. Various theorists have responded to this problem by talking about warranted true belief instead. In this regard, warrant implies that the corresponding belief is not accepted on the basis of mere cognitive luck or accident. However, not everyone agrees that this and similar cases actually constitute counterexamples to the JTB definition: some have argued that, in these cases, the agent actually knows the fact in question, e.g. that the driver in the fake barn example knows that the object in front of them is a barn despite the luck involved. A similar defense is based on the idea that to insist on the absence of cognitive luck leads to a form of infallibilism about justification, i.e. that justification has to guarantee the belief's truth. However, most knowledge claims are not that strict and allow instead that the justification involved may be fallible.

=== The Gettier problem ===
An Euler diagram representing a version of the Justified True Belief definition of knowledge that is adapted to the Gettier problem. This problem gives us reason to think that not all justified true beliefs constitute knowledge.

Edmund Gettier is best known for his 1963 paper entitled "Is Justified True Belief Knowledge?", which called into question the common conception of knowledge as justified true belief. In just two and a half pages, Gettier argued that there are situations in which one's belief may be justified and true, yet fail to count as knowledge. That is, Gettier contended that while justified belief in a true proposition is necessary for that proposition to be known, it is not sufficient.

According to Gettier, there are certain circumstances in which one does not have knowledge, even when all of the above conditions are met. Gettier proposed two thought experiments, which have become known as Gettier cases, as counterexamples to the classical account of knowledge. One of the cases involves two men, Smith and Jones, who are awaiting the results of their applications for the same job. Each man has ten coins in his pocket. Smith has excellent reasons to believe that Jones will get the job (the head of the company told him); and furthermore, Smith knows that Jones has ten coins in his pocket (he recently counted them). From this Smith infers: "The man who will get the job has ten coins in his pocket." However, Smith is unaware that he also has ten coins in his own pocket. Furthermore, it turns out that Smith, not Jones, is going to get the job. While Smith has strong evidence to believe that Jones will get the job, he is wrong. Smith therefore has a justified true belief that the man who will get the job has ten coins in his pocket; however, according to Gettier, Smith does not know that the man who will get the job has ten coins in his pocket, because Smith's belief is "...true by virtue of the number of coins in Jones's pocket, while Smith does not know how many coins are in Smith's pocket, and bases his belief... on a count of the coins in Jones's pocket, whom he falsely believes to be the man who will get the job." These cases fail to be knowledge because the subject's belief is justified, but only happens to be true by virtue of luck. In other words, he made the correct choice (believing that the man who will get the job has ten coins in his pocket) for the wrong reasons. Gettier then goes on to offer a second similar case, providing the means by which the specifics of his examples can be generalized into a broader problem for defining knowledge in terms of justified true belief.

There have been various notable responses to the Gettier problem. Typically, they have involved substantial attempts to provide a new definition of knowledge that is not susceptible to Gettier-style objections, either by providing an additional fourth condition that justified true beliefs must meet to constitute knowledge, or proposing a completely new set of necessary and sufficient conditions for knowledge. While there have been far too many published responses for all of them to be mentioned, some of the most notable responses are discussed below.

== Responses and alternative definitions ==
The problems with the JTB definition of knowledge have provoked diverse responses. Strictly speaking, most contemporary philosophers deny the JTB definition of knowledge, at least in its exact form. Edmund Gettier's counterexamples were very influential in shaping this contemporary outlook. They usually involve some form of cognitive luck whereby the justification is not responsible or relevant to the belief being true. Some responses stay within the standard definition and try to make smaller modifications to mitigate the problems, for example, concerning how justification is defined. Others see the problems as insurmountable and propose radical new conceptions of knowledge, many of which do not require justification at all. Between these two extremes, various epistemologists have settled for a moderate departure from the standard definition. They usually accept that it is a step in the right direction: justified true belief is necessary for knowledge. However, they deny that it is sufficient. This means that knowledge always implies justified true belief but that not every justified true belief constitutes knowledge. Instead, they propose an additional fourth criterion needed for sufficiency. The resulting definitions are sometimes referred to as JTB+X accounts of knowledge. A closely related approach is to replace justification with warrant, which is then defined as justification together with whatever else is needed to amount to knowledge.

The goal of introducing an additional criterion is to avoid counterexamples in the form of Gettier cases. Numerous suggestions for such a fourth feature have been made, for example, the requirement that the belief is not inferred from a falsehood. While alternative accounts are often successful at avoiding many specific cases, it has been argued that most of them fail to avoid all counterexamples because they leave open the possibility of cognitive luck. So while introducing an additional criterion may help exclude various known examples of cognitive luck, the resulting definition is often still susceptible to new cases. The only way to avoid this problem is to ensure that the additional criterion excludes cognitive luck. This is often understood in the sense that the presence of the feature has to entail the belief's truth. So if it is possible that a belief has this feature without being true, then cases of cognitive luck are possible in which a true belief has this feature but is not true because of this feature. The problem is avoided by defining knowledge as non-accidentally true belief. A similar approach introduces an anti-luck condition: the belief is not true merely by luck. But it is not clear how useful these definitions are unless a more precise definition of "non-accidental" or "absence of luck" could be provided. This vagueness makes the application to non-obvious cases difficult. A closely related and more precise definition requires that the belief is safely formed, i.e. that the process responsible would not have produced the corresponding belief if it was not true. This means that, whatever the given situation is like, this process tracks the fact. Richard Kirkham suggests that our definition of knowledge requires that the evidence for the belief necessitates its truth.

=== Defeasibility theory ===
Defeasibility theories of knowledge introduce an additional condition based on defeasibility in order to avoid the different problems faced by the JTB accounts. They emphasize that, besides having a good reason for holding the belief, it is also necessary that there is no defeating evidence against it. This is usually understood in a very wide sense: a justified true belief does not amount to knowledge when there is a truth that would constitute a defeating reason of the belief if the person knew about it. This wide sense is necessary to avoid Gettier cases of cognitive luck. So in the barn example above, it explains that the belief does not amount to knowledge because, if the person were aware of the prevalence of fake barns in this area, this awareness would act as a defeater of the belief that this one particular building is a real barn. In this way, the defeasibility theory can identify accidentally justified beliefs as unwarranted. One of its problems is that it excludes too many beliefs from knowledge. This concerns specifically misleading defeaters, i.e. truths that would give the false impression to the agent that one of their reasons was defeated. According to Keith Lehrer, cases of cognitive luck can be avoided by requiring that the justification does not depend on any false statement. On his view, "S knows that p if and only if (i) it is true that p, (ii) S accepts that p, (iii) S is justified in accepting that p, and (iv) S is justified in accepting p in some way that does not depend on any false statement".

=== Reliabilism and causal theory ===
Reliabilistic and causal theories are forms of externalism. Some versions only modify the JTB definition of knowledge by reconceptualizing what justification means. Others constitute further departures by holding that justification is not necessary, that reliability or the right causal connections act as replacements of justification. According to reliabilism, a true belief constitutes knowledge if it was produced by a reliable process or method. Putative examples of reliable processes are regular perception under normal circumstances and the scientific method. Defenders of this approach affirm that reliability acts as a safeguard against lucky coincidence. Virtue reliabilism is a special form of reliabilism in which intellectual virtues, such as properly functioning cognitive faculties, are responsible for producing knowledge.

Reliabilists have struggled to give an explicit and plausible account of when a process is reliable. One approach defines it through a high success rate: a belief-forming process is reliable within a certain area if it produces a high ratio of true beliefs in this area. Another approach understands reliability in terms of how the process would fare in counterfactual scenarios. Arguments against both of these definitions have been presented. A further criticism is based on the claim that reliability is not sufficient in cases where the agent is not in possession of any reasons justifying the belief even though the responsible process is reliable.

The causal theory of knowledge holds that the believed fact has to cause the true belief in the right way for the belief to amount to knowledge. For example, the belief that there is a bird in the tree may constitute knowledge if the bird and the tree caused the corresponding perception and belief. The causal connection helps to avoid some cases of cognitive luck since the belief is not accidental anymore. However, it does not avoid all of them, as can be seen in the fake barn example above, where the perception of the real barn caused the belief about the real barn even though it was a lucky coincidence. Another shortcoming of the causal theory is that various beliefs are knowledge even though a causal connection to the represented facts does not exist or may not be possible. This is the case for beliefs in mathematical propositions, like that "2 + 2 = 4", and in certain general propositions, like that "no elephant is smaller than a kitten".

=== Virtue-theoretic definition ===
Virtue-theoretic approaches try to avoid the problem of cognitive luck by seeing knowledge as a manifestation of intellectual virtues. On this view, virtues are properties of a person that aim at some good. In the case of intellectual virtues, the principal good is truth. In this regard, Linda Zagzebski defines knowledge as "cognitive contact with reality arising out of acts of intellectual virtue". A closely related approach understands intellectual virtues in analogy to the successful manifestation of skills. This is helpful to clarify how cognitive luck is avoided. For example, an archer may hit the bull's eye due to luck or because of their skill. Based on this line of thought, Ernest Sosa defines knowledge as a belief that "is true in a way manifesting, or attributable to, the believer's skill".

=== "No false premises" response ===
One of the earliest suggested replies to Gettier, and perhaps the most intuitive way to respond to the Gettier problem, is the "no false premises" response, sometimes also called the "no false lemmas" response. Most notably, this reply was defended by David Malet Armstrong in his 1973 book, Belief, Truth, and Knowledge. The basic form of the response is to assert that the person who holds the justified true belief (for instance, Smith in Gettier's first case) made the mistake of inferring a true belief (e.g. "The person who will get the job has ten coins in his pocket") from a false belief (e.g. "Jones will get the job"). Proponents of this response therefore propose that we add a fourth necessary and sufficient condition for knowledge, namely, "the justified true belief must not have been inferred from a false belief".

This reply to the Gettier problem is simple, direct, and appears to isolate what goes wrong in forming the relevant beliefs in Gettier cases. However, the general consensus is that it fails. This is because while the original formulation by Gettier includes a person who infers a true belief from a false belief, there are many alternate formulations in which this is not the case. Take, for instance, a case where an observer sees what appears to be a dog walking through a park and forms the belief "There is a dog in the park". In fact, it turns out that the observer is not looking at a dog at all, but rather a very lifelike robotic facsimile of a dog. However, unbeknownst to the observer, there is in fact a dog in the park, albeit one standing behind the robotic facsimile of a dog. Since the belief "There is a dog in the park" does not involve a faulty inference, but is instead formed as the result of misleading perceptual information, there is no inference made from a false premise. It therefore seems that while the observer does in fact have a true belief that her perceptual experience provides justification for holding, she does not actually know that there is a dog in the park. Instead, she just seems to have formed a "lucky" justified true belief.

=== Infallibilist response ===
One less common response to the Gettier problem is defended by Richard Kirkham, who has argued that the only definition of knowledge that could ever be immune to all counterexamples is the infallibilist definition. To qualify as an item of knowledge, goes the theory, a belief must not only be true and justified, the justification of the belief must necessitate its truth. In other words, the justification for the belief must be infallible.

While infallibilism is indeed an internally coherent response to the Gettier problem, it is incompatible with our everyday knowledge ascriptions. For instance, as the Cartesian skeptic will point out, all of my perceptual experiences are compatible with a skeptical scenario in which I am completely deceived about the existence of the external world, in which case most (if not all) of my beliefs would be false. The typical conclusion to draw from this is that it is possible to doubt most (if not all) of my everyday beliefs, meaning that if I am indeed justified in holding those beliefs, that justification is not infallible. For the justification to be infallible, my reasons for holding my everyday beliefs would need to completely exclude the possibility that those beliefs were false. Consequently, if a belief must be infallibly justified in order to constitute knowledge, then it must be the case that we are mistaken in most (if not all) instances in which we claim to have knowledge in everyday situations. While it is indeed possible to bite the bullet and accept this conclusion, most philosophers find it implausible to suggest that we know nothing or almost nothing, and therefore reject the infallibilist response as collapsing into radical skepticism.

=== Tracking condition ===
Robert Nozick has offered a definition of knowledge according to which S knows that P if and only if:

- P is true;
- S believes that P;
- if P were false, S would not believe that P;
- if P were true, S would believe that P.

Nozick argues that the third of these conditions serves to address cases of the sort described by Gettier. Nozick further claims this condition addresses a case of the sort described by D.M. Armstrong: A father believes his daughter is innocent of committing a particular crime, both because of faith in his baby girl and (now) because he has seen presented in the courtroom a conclusive demonstration of his daughter's innocence. His belief via the method of the courtroom satisfies the four subjunctive conditions, but his faith-based belief does not. If his daughter were guilty, he would still believe her innocence, on the basis of faith in his daughter; this would violate the third condition.

The British philosopher Simon Blackburn has criticized this formulation by suggesting that we do not want to accept as knowledge beliefs which, while they "track the truth" (as Nozick's account requires), are not held for appropriate reasons. In addition to this, externalist accounts of knowledge, such as Nozick's, are often forced to reject closure in cases where it is intuitively valid.

An account similar to Nozick's has also been offered by Fred Dretske, although his view focuses more on relevant alternatives that might have obtained if things had turned out differently. Views of both the Nozick variety and the Dretske variety have faced serious problems suggested by Saul Kripke.

=== Knowledge-first response ===
Timothy Williamson has advanced a theory of knowledge according to which knowledge is not justified true belief plus some extra conditions, but primary. In his book Knowledge and its Limits, Williamson argues that the concept of knowledge cannot be broken down into a set of other concepts through analysis—instead, it is sui generis. Thus, according to Williamson, justification, truth, and belief are necessary but not sufficient for knowledge. Williamson is also known for being one of the only philosophers who take knowledge to be a mental state; most epistemologists assert that belief (as opposed to knowledge) is a mental state. As such, Williamson's claim has been seen to be highly counterintuitive.

=== Merely true belief ===
In his 1991 paper, "Knowledge is Merely True Belief", Crispin Sartwell argues that justification is an unnecessary criterion for knowledge. He argues that common counterexample cases of "lucky guesses" are not in fact beliefs at all, as "no belief stands in isolation... the claim that someone believes something entails that that person has some degree of serious commitment to the claim." He gives the example of a mathematician working on a problem who subconsciously, in a "flash of insight", sees the answer, but is unable to comprehensively justify his belief, and says that in such a case the mathematician still knows the answer, despite not being able to give a step-by-step explanation of how he got to it. He also argues that if beliefs require justification to constitute knowledge, then foundational beliefs can never be knowledge, and, as these are the beliefs upon which all our other beliefs depend for their justification, we can thus never have knowledge at all.

=== Nyaya philosophy ===
Nyaya is one of the six traditional schools of Indian philosophy with a particular interest in epistemology. The Indian philosopher B.K. Matilal drew on the Navya-Nyāya fallibilist tradition to respond to the Gettier problem. Nyaya theory distinguishes between know p and know that one knows p—these are different events, with different causal conditions. The second level is a sort of implicit inference that usually follows immediately the episode of knowing p (knowledge simpliciter). The Gettier case is examined by referring to a view of Gangesha Upadhyaya (late 12th century), who takes any true belief to be knowledge; thus a true belief acquired through a wrong route may just be regarded as knowledge simpliciter on this view. The question of justification arises only at the second level, when one considers the knowledge-hood of the acquired belief. Initially, there is lack of uncertainty, so it becomes a true belief. But at the very next moment, when the hearer is about to embark upon the venture of knowing whether he knows p, doubts may arise. "If, in some Gettier-like cases, I am wrong in my inference about the knowledge-hood of the given occurrent belief (for the evidence may be pseudo-evidence), then I am mistaken about the truth of my belief—and this is in accordance with Nyaya fallibilism: not all knowledge-claims can be sustained."

=== Other definitions ===
According to J. L. Austin, to know just means to be able to make correct assertions about the subject in question. On this pragmatic view, the internal mental states of the knower do not matter.

Philosopher Barry Allen also downplayed the role of mental states in knowledge and defined knowledge as "superlative artifactual performance", that is, exemplary performance with artifacts, including language but also technological objects like bridges, satellites, and diagrams. Allen criticized typical epistemology for its "propositional bias" (treating propositions as prototypical knowledge), its "analytic bias" (treating knowledge as prototypically mental or conceptual), and its "discursive bias" (treating knowledge as prototypically discursive). He considered knowledge to be too diverse to characterize in terms of necessary and sufficient conditions. He claimed not to be substituting knowledge-how for knowledge-that, but instead proposing a definition that is more general than both. For Allen, knowledge is "deeper than language, different from belief, more valuable than truth".

A different approach characterizes knowledge in relation to the role it plays, for example, regarding the reasons it provides or constitutes for doing or thinking something. In this sense, it can be understood as what entitles the agent to assert a fact, to use this fact as a premise when reasoning, or to act as a trustworthy informant concerning this fact. This definition has been adopted in some argumentation theory.

Paul Silva's "awareness first" epistemology posits that the common core of knowledge is awareness, providing a definition that accounts for both beliefless knowledge and knowledge grounded in belief.

Within anthropology, knowledge is often defined in a very broad sense as equivalent to understanding or culture. This includes the idea that knowledge consists in the affirmation of meaning contents and depends on a substrate, such as a brain. Knowledge characterizes social groups in the sense that different individuals belonging to the same social niche tend to be very similar concerning what they know and how they organize information. This topic is of specific interest to the subfield known as the anthropology of knowledge, which uses this and similar definitions to study how knowledge is reproduced and how it changes on the social level in different cultural contexts.

== Non-propositional knowledge ==
Propositional knowledge, also termed factual knowledge or knowledge-that, is the most paradigmatic form of knowledge in analytic philosophy, and most definitions of knowledge in philosophy have this form in mind. It refers to the possession of certain information. The distinction to other types of knowledge is often drawn based on the differences between the linguistic formulations used to express them. It is termed knowledge-that since it can usually be expressed using a that-clause, as in "I know that Dave is at home". In everyday discourse, the term "knowledge" can also refer to various other phenomena as forms of non-propositional knowledge. Some theorists distinguish knowledge-wh from knowledge-that. Knowledge-wh is expressed using a wh-clause, such as knowing why smoke causes cancer or knowing who killed John F. Kennedy. However, the more common approach is to understand knowledge-wh as a type of knowledge-that since the corresponding expressions can usually be paraphrased using a that-clause.

A clearer contrast is between knowledge-that and knowledge-how (know-how). Know-how is also referred to as practical knowledge or ability knowledge. It is expressed in formulations like, "I know how to ride a bike." All forms of practical knowledge involve some type of competence, i.e., having the ability to do something. So to know how to play the guitar means to have the competence to play it or to know the multiplication table is to be able to recite products of numbers. For this reason, know-how may be defined as having the corresponding competence, skills, or abilities. Some forms of know-how include knowledge-that as well and some theorists even argue that practical and propositional knowledge are of the same type. However, propositional knowledge is usually reserved only to humans while practical knowledge is more common in the animal kingdom. For example, an ant knows how to walk but it presumably does not know that it is currently walking in someone's kitchen. The more common view is, therefore, to see knowledge-how and knowledge-that as two distinct types of knowledge.

Another often-discussed alternative type of knowledge is knowledge by acquaintance. It is defined as a direct familiarity with an individual, often with a person, and only arises if one has met this individual personally. In this regard, it constitutes a relation not to a proposition but to an object. Acquaintance implies that one has had a direct perceptual experience with the object of knowledge and is therefore familiar with it. Bertrand Russell contrasts it with knowledge by description, which refers to knowledge of things that the subject has not immediately experienced, such as learning through a documentary about a country one has not yet visited. Knowledge by acquaintance can be expressed using a direct object, such as, "I know Dave." It differs in this regard from knowledge-that since no that-clause is needed. One can know facts about an individual without direct acquaintance with that individual. For example, the reader may know that Napoleon was a French military leader without knowing Napoleon personally. There is controversy whether knowledge by acquaintance is a form of non-propositional knowledge. Some theorists deny this and contend that it is just a grammatically different way of expressing propositional knowledge.
