= Fact =

Datum or structured component of reality

A fact is a true datum about one or more aspects of a circumstance, or an occurrence in the real world. Standard reference works are often used to check facts. Scientific facts are verified by careful, repeatable observation or measurement by experiments or other means. After accounts of knowledge of facts such as that in 2002 by epistemologist Angelika Kratzer being applied to Gettier problems (first discovered in the mid-20th century), according to Paul Boghossian, the Enlightenment-era consensus justified true belief definition of knowledge in which knowledge encompasses facts is the "standard, widely accepted" one, though with Bernecker and Dretske (2000) arguing that "no epistemologist since Gettier has seriously and successfully defended the traditional view." This is despite wide, though not universal, agreement among analytic philosophers that the first two criteria of the definition are correct, i.e., that knowledge implies an agent accepting a true proposition (such as a fact).

For example, "This sentence contains words" accurately describes a linguistic fact, and "the Sun is a star" describes an astronomical fact. Further, "Abraham Lincoln was the 16th president of the United States" and "Abraham Lincoln was assassinated" are both historical facts.

== Etymology and usage ==
The word fact derives from the Latin factum. It was first used in English with the same meaning: "a thing done or performed" – a meaning now obsolete outside the law. The common usage of "something that has really occurred or is the case" dates from the mid-16th century.

Barbara J. Shapiro wrote in her book A Culture of Fact how the concept of a fact evolved, starting within the English legal tradition of the 16th century.

In 1870, Charles Sanders Peirce described in his book The Fixation of Belief four methods which people use to decide what they should believe: tenacity, method of authority, a priori and scientific method.

The term fact also indicates a matter under discussion deemed to be true or correct, such as to emphasize a point or prove a disputed issue; (e.g., "... the fact of the matter is ...").

Alternatively, fact may also indicate an allegation or stipulation of something that may or may not be a true fact, (e.g., "the author's facts are not trustworthy"). This alternate usage, although contested by some, has a long history in standard English according to the American Heritage Dictionary of the English Language. The Oxford English Dictionary dates this use to 1729.

Fact may also indicate findings derived through a process of evaluation, including review of testimony, direct observation, or otherwise; as distinguishable from matters of inference or speculation. This use is reflected in the terms "fact-find" and "fact-finder" (e.g., "set up a fact-finding commission").

Facts may be checked by reason, experiment, personal experience, or may be argued from authority. Roger Bacon wrote "If in other sciences we should arrive at certainty without doubt and truth without error, it behooves us to place the foundations of knowledge in mathematics."

== In philosophy ==
In philosophy, the concept fact is most commonly considered in the branch of philosophy concerned with knowledge and truth, called epistemology, and possibly also under the branch called ontology, which studies concepts such as existence, being, becoming, and reality. Questions of objectivity and truth are closely associated with questions of fact. A fact can be defined as something that is the case, in other words, a state of affairs.

Facts may be understood as information, which makes a true sentence true: "A fact is, traditionally, the worldly correlate of a true proposition, a state of affairs whose obtaining makes that proposition true." Facts may also be understood as those things to which a true sentence refers. The statement "Jupiter is the largest planet in the Solar System" is about the fact that Jupiter is the largest planet in the Solar System.

=== Correspondence and the slingshot argument ===
Pascal Engel's version of the correspondence theory of truth explains that what makes a sentence true is that it corresponds to a fact. This theory presupposes the existence of an objective world.

The Slingshot argument claims to show that all true statements stand for the same thing, the truth value true. If this argument holds, and facts are taken to be what true statements stand for, then one arrives at the counter-intuitive conclusion that there is only one fact: the truth.

=== Compound facts ===
Any non-trivial true statement about reality is necessarily an abstraction composed of a complex of objects and properties or relations. Facts "possess internal structure, being complexes of objects and properties or relations". For example, the fact described by the true statement "Paris is the capital city of France" implies that there is such a place as Paris, there is such a place as France, there are such things as capital cities, as well as that France has a government, that the government of France has the power to define its capital city, and that the French government has chosen Paris to be the capital, that there is such a thing as a place or a government, and so on. The verifiable accuracy of all of these assertions, if facts themselves, may coincide to create the fact, that Paris is the capital of France.

Difficulties arise, however, in attempting to identify the constituent parts of negative, modal, disjunctive, or moral facts.

=== Fact–value distinction ===
Moral philosophers since David Hume have debated whether values are objective, and thus factual. In A Treatise of Human Nature Hume pointed out there is no obvious way for a series of statements about what ought to be the case to be derived from a series of statements of what is the case. This is called the is–ought distinction. Those who insist there is a logical gulf between facts and values, such that it is fallacious to attempt to derive values (e.g., "it is good to give food to hungry people") from facts (e.g., "people will die if they can't eat"), include G. E. Moore, who called attempting to do so the naturalistic fallacy.

=== Factual–counterfactual distinction ===
Factuality—what has occurred—can also be contrasted with counterfactuality: what might have occurred, but did not. A counterfactual conditional or subjunctive conditional is a conditional (or "if–then") statement indicating what would be the case if events had been other than they were. For example, "If Alexander had lived, his empire would have been greater than Rome." This contrasts with an indicative conditional, which indicates what is (in fact) the case if its antecedent is (in fact) true—for example, "If you drink this, it will make you well." Such sentences are important to modal logic, especially since the development of possible world semantics.

== In mathematics ==
In mathematics, a fact is a statement (called a theorem) that can be proven by logical argument from certain axioms and definitions.

== In science ==
The definition of a scientific fact is different from the definition of fact, as it implies knowledge. A scientific fact is the result of a repeatable careful observation or measurement by experimentation or other means, also called empirical evidence. These are central to building scientific theories. Various forms of observation and measurement lead to fundamental questions about the scientific method, and the scope and validity of scientific reasoning.

In the most basic sense, a scientific fact is an objective and verifiable observation, in contrast with a hypothesis or theory, which is intended to explain or interpret facts.

Various scholars have offered significant refinements to this basic formulation. Philosophers and scientists are careful to distinguish between: 1) states of affairs in the external world and 2) assertions of fact that may be considered relevant in scientific analysis. The term is used in both senses in the philosophy of science.

Scholars and clinical researchers in both the social and natural sciences have written about numerous questions and theories that arise in the attempt to clarify the fundamental nature of scientific fact. Pertinent issues raised by this inquiry include:

- the process by which "established fact" becomes recognized and accepted as such;
- whether and to what extent "fact" and "theoretic explanation" can be considered truly independent and separable from one another;
- to what extent "facts" are influenced by the mere act of observation; and
- to what extent factual conclusions are influenced by history and consensus, rather than a strictly systematic methodology.

Consistent with the idea of confirmation holism, some scholars assert "fact" to be necessarily "theory-laden" to some degree. Thomas Kuhn points out that knowing what facts to measure, and how to measure them, requires the use of other theories. For example, the age of fossils is based on radiometric dating, which is justified by reasoning that radioactive decay follows a Poisson process rather than a Bernoulli process. Similarly, Percy Williams Bridgman is credited with the methodological position known as operationalism, which asserts that all observations are not only influenced, but necessarily defined, by the means and assumptions used to measure them.

=== The scientific method ===
Apart from the fundamental inquiry into the nature of scientific fact, there remain the practical and social considerations of how fact is investigated, established, and substantiated through the proper application of the scientific method. Scientific facts are generally believed independent of the observer: no matter who performs a scientific experiment, all observers agree on the outcome. In addition to these considerations, there are the social and institutional measures, such as peer review and accreditation, that are intended to promote factual accuracy among other interests in scientific study.

== In history ==
A common rhetorical cliché states, "History is written by the winners". This phrase suggests but does not examine the use of facts in the writing of history.

E. H. Carr in his 1961 volume What is History? argues that the inherent biases from the gathering of facts makes the objective truth of any historical perspective idealistic and impossible. Facts are, "like fish in the Ocean", of which we may only happen to catch a few, only an indication of what is below the surface. Even a dragnet cannot tell us for certain what it would be like to live below the Ocean's surface. Even if we do not discard any facts (or fish) presented, we will always miss the majority; the site of our fishing, the methods undertaken, the weather and even luck play a vital role in what we will catch. Additionally, the composition of history is inevitably made up by the compilation of many different biases of fact finding – all compounded over time. He concludes that for a historian to attempt a more objective method, one must accept that history can only aspire to a conversation of the present with the past – and that one's methods of fact gathering should be openly examined. The set of highlighted historical facts, and their interpretations, therefore changes over time, and reflect present consensuses.

== In law ==
This section of the article emphasizes common law jurisprudence as primarily represented in Anglo-American–based legal tradition. Nevertheless, the principles described herein have analogous treatment in other legal systems such as civil law systems as well.

In most common law jurisdictions, the general concept and analysis of fact reflects fundamental principles of jurisprudence, and is supported by several well-established standards. Matters of fact have various formal definitions under common law jurisdictions.

These include:

- an element required in legal pleadings to demonstrate a cause of action;
- the determinations of the finder of fact after evaluating admissible evidence produced in a trial or hearing;
- a potential ground of reversible error forwarded on appeal in an appellate court; and
- any of various matters subject to investigation by official authority to establish whether a crime has been perpetrated, and to establish culpability.

=== Legal pleadings ===
A party (e.g., plaintiff) to a civil suit generally must clearly state the relevant allegations of fact that form the basis of a claim. The requisite level of precision and particularity of these allegations varies, depending on the rules of civil procedure and jurisdiction. Parties who face uncertainties regarding facts and circumstances attendant to their side in a dispute may sometimes invoke alternative pleading. In this situation, a party may plead separate sets of facts that when considered together may be contradictory or mutually exclusive. This seemingly logically-inconsistent presentation of facts may be necessary as a safeguard against contingencies such as res judicata that would otherwise preclude presenting a claim or defense that depends on a particular interpretation of the underlying facts and ruling of the court.

== See also ==
- Brute fact
- Common misconceptions
- Consensus reality
- Counterfactual history
- De facto, or 'from fact'
- Factoid
- False statement
- Fiction
- Lie
- Truth
