= Epistemic minimalism =

Philosophical position

Epistemic minimalism is the epistemological thesis that mere true belief is sufficient for knowledge. That is, the meaning of "Smith knows that it rained today" is accurately and completely analyzed by these two conditions:

1. Smith believes that it rained today.
2. It is true that it rained today.

The thesis is called minimalist by way of contrast with the competing accounts, which more or less universally require that true belief is necessary but insufficient for knowledge—that is, that a belief needs to be true in order to count as knowledge, but that truth alone is not enough—that something else is needed. Traditionally, that something else was held to be evidential justification; today it is usually held to be either justification and also some other condition, or else some other condition instead of justification, which will avoid the Gettier problem.

Whatever the analysis, though, the standard view (both pre-Gettier and post-Gettier) pushes for narrower analyses of knowledge than mere true belief. Epistemic minimalism turns in exactly the opposite direction, and argues for a much more inclusive analysis--one which includes even Gettier cases, lucky guesses, and completely unjustified beliefs, as long as they happen to be true. The thesis is a minimalism in the sense that it eschews the additional requirements piled on top of true belief and argues that the intuitive reasons given for the justified true belief (JTB) analysis and its descendants are either misleading or misunderstood.

The most famous (or infamous) proponent of epistemic minimalism is Crispin Sartwell (1991). The view has been criticized by many epistemologists, with an influential criticism being delivered by William Lycan (1994).
