= Knowledge and Its Limits =

2000 philosophical book by Timothy Williamson

- Author: Timothy Williamson
- Genre: Epistemology
- Published: 2000
- Publisher: Oxford University Press
- Pages: 354 pages
- ISBN: 9780191598678

Knowledge and Its Limits, a 2000 book by philosopher Timothy Williamson, argues that the concept of knowledge cannot be analyzed into a set of other concepts; instead, it is sui generis. Thus, though knowledge requires justification, truth, and belief, the word "knowledge" cannot be accurately regarded as simply shorthand for "justified true belief". It initiated a new approach to epistemology, generally referred to as knowledge-first epistemology.

== See also ==
- Gettier problem
- Knowledge
- Epistemology
