= William Lycan =

American philosopher

- Born: William G. Lycan; September 26, 1945 (age 81); Milwaukee, Wisconsin, U.S.

Education
- Education: Amherst College (B.A.); University of Chicago (M.A., Ph.D.)
- Thesis: Persons, Criteria, and Materialism (1970)
- Doctoral advisor: Vere Claiborne Chappell

Philosophical work
- Era: Contemporary philosophy
- Region: Western philosophy
- School: Analytic
- Institutions: Ohio State University; University of North Carolina, Chapel Hill
- Doctoral students: Peter Alward
- Main interests: Philosophy of language, philosophy of mind, epistemology, metaphysics, linguistics
- Notable ideas: Homuncular functionalism

William G. Lycan (/ˈlaɪkən/ LY-kən; born September 26, 1945) is an American philosopher and professor emeritus at University of North Carolina at Chapel Hill, where he was formerly the William Rand Kenan, Jr. Distinguished Professor. Since 2011, Lycan is also distinguished visiting professor of philosophy at the University of Connecticut, where he continues to research, teach, and advise graduate students.

== Education and career ==
William Lycan received his B.A. from Amherst College in 1966, where he also worked as a teaching assistant in the Music department. His honors thesis was on "Noam Chomsky's Investigation of Syntax." He went on to attend graduate school at the University of Chicago, where he received an M.A. in 1967 and a Ph.D. in 1970. His doctoral dissertation was on "Persons, Criteria, and Materialism."

Lycan taught for twelve years at Ohio State University, before joining the faculty at the University of North Carolina, Chapel Hill in 1982, where he is now emeritus.

He won the Class of 2001 Outstanding Faculty Award (in 2001) and a Distinguished Teaching Award for Post-Baccalaureate Instruction in 2002. In 2013, he was elected an Honorary Fellow of the Australian Academy of the Humanities.

== Philosophical work ==
His principal interests include philosophy of mind, philosophy of language, philosophy of linguistics, epistemology, and metaphysics. The author of eight books and over 150 articles (and over 20 reviews), Lycan is an advocate of the version of functionalism, known as homuncular functionalism.

Lycan is an unapologetic realist and physicalist about almost everything – mental states (intentionality and consciousness), epistemic justification, linguistic meaning, perception (especially color and smell), moral properties, aesthetic properties, and more. This philosophical tapestry is held together by several common threads, which among others include: the view that persons are complex systems composed of sub-personal systems, sub-sub-personal systems, etc., all the way down to sub-atomic functions; the view that natural teleology is ubiquitous, that there exists a non-ideal but nonetheless discernible evolved fit between human capacities and the environment; and the view that meaning in natural language manifests a logical form that at its core is truth-functional.

These (and other) common threads are prominent in Lycan's theories of mind. Mental states are type-identical to functional states instantiated in sub- or sub-sub-personal systems, where the function of any such state is determined by its natural teleology. This is Lycan's homuncular functionalism. The appeal to teleology dissolves problems with earlier functionalist theories, especially those concerning consciousness. A correct theory of consciousness, on Lycan's view, comprises multiple parts corresponding to the multiple phenomena to which the term ‘consciousness’ is applied. Thus, Lycan defends a higher-order, inner sense theory of awareness, according to which attention mechanisms have the function of monitoring and integrating lower level psychological processes; a pronominal theory of subjectivity, according to which the subjective or perspectival nature of conscious states is a product of the utterly unique semantic role of introspective mental concepts (e.g., ‘I’); a representational theory of qualia, according to which sensory qualities are the intentional objects of sensory representations; and more. (Consciousness 1987; Consciousness and Experience 1996.)

These same threads are prominent in Lycan's account of knowledge, including his account of belief acquisition and epistemic justification. To acquire a new belief is to acquire a new real, internal representation instantiated in one's functional architecture. And a new belief is justified if it, better than its competitors, increases the explanatory coherence of the person's entire belief set. This is Lycan's explanationist theory of justification. Canons of epistemic value used to identify degrees of explanatory coherence are themselves justified by appeal to natural teleology. (Judgement and Justification 1988.) In defense of his view, Lycan critically assesses major competitors (especially reliabilism) and other views (e.g., epistemic minimalism).

Meaning in natural language (Logical Form in Natural Language, 1984), including the meaning of indicative conditionals (Real Conditionals 2001), is explained by Lycan in truth-theoretic terms. Here, too, the requisite psycho-linguistic machinery coheres with Lycan's homuncular functionalism and, more generally, with the above common threads.

Along with Robert Adams, Lycan considers David Kellogg Lewis's notion of possible worlds to be metaphysically extravagant and suggests in its place an actualist interpretation of possible worlds as consistent, maximally complete sets of descriptions or propositions about the world, so that a "possible world" is conceived of as a complete description (i.e. a maximally consistent set of propositions) of a way the world could be – rather than a world which is that way.

== Publications ==
- Logical Form in Natural Language (Bradford Books / MIT Press, 1984), xii + 348 pp.
- Knowing Who (with Steven Boër) (Bradford Books / MIT Press, 1986), xiv + 212 pp.
- Consciousness (Bradford Books / MIT Press, 1987), ix + 165 pp.
- Judgement and Justification (Cambridge University Press, 1988), xiii + 230 pp.
- Modality and Meaning (Kluwer Academic Publishing, Studies in Linguistics and Philosophy series, 1994), xxii + 335 pp.
- Consciousness and Experience (Bradford Books / MIT Press, 1996), xx + 211 pp.
- Philosophy of Language: A Contemporary Introduction (Routledge Publishers, 1999., 3rd ed. 2018), xvi + 243 pp.
- Real Conditionals (Oxford University Press, 2001), vii + 223 pp.
- On Evidence in Philosophy (Oxford University Press, 2018), 106 pp.

== See also ==
- American philosophy
- List of American philosophers
