= Procedural knowledge =

Knowledge of how to perform a task

Procedural knowledge, also known as know-how, (Note: Other names include: knowing-how, practical knowledge, imperative knowledge, and performative knowledge.) is the knowledge exercised in the performance of some task. Unlike descriptive knowledge (also known as declarative knowledge, propositional knowledge or "knowing-that"), which involves knowledge of specific propositions (e.g. "I know that snow is white"), that is, facts that can be expressed using declarative sentences, procedural knowledge involves one's ability to do something (e.g. "I know how to change a flat tire"). A person does not need to verbally articulate their procedural knowledge for it to count as knowledge, since procedural knowledge requires only knowing how to correctly perform an action or exercise a skill.

The term procedural knowledge has narrower but related technical uses in both cognitive psychology and intellectual property law.

== Overview ==
Procedural knowledge (i.e., knowledge-how) is different from descriptive knowledge (i.e., knowledge-that) in that it can be directly applied to a task. For instance, the procedural knowledge one uses to solve problems differs from the declarative knowledge one possesses about problem solving because this knowledge is formed by doing.

The distinction between knowing-how and knowing-that was brought to prominence in epistemology by Gilbert Ryle who used it in his book The Concept of Mind.

Know-how is also often referred to in lay terms as street smarts (sometimes conceived as the opposite of book smarts), and a person employing their street smarts as street wise. Know-how is often tacit knowledge, which means that it can be difficult to transfer to another person by means of writing it down or verbalising it. The opposite of tacit knowledge is explicit knowledge.

== Definition ==
Procedural knowledge is the "know how" attributed to technology defined by cognitive psychologists, which refers to "knowing how to do something". Part of the complexity of it comes in trying to link it to terms such as process, problem solving, strategic thinking and the like, which in turn requires distinguishing different levels of procedure. It is the ability to execute action sequences to solve problems. This type of knowledge is tied to specific problem types and therefore is not widely generalizable. Procedural knowledge is goal-oriented and mediates problem-solving behavior.

The concept of procedural knowledge is also widely used in mathematics educational researches. The well-influential definition of procedural knowledge in this domain comes from the introductory chapter by Hiebert and Lefevre (1986) of the seminal book "Conceptual and procedural knowledge: The case of mathematics", in which they divided procedural knowledge into two categories. The first one is a familiarity with the individual symbols of the system and with the syntactic conventions for acceptable configurations of symbols. The second one consists of rules or procedures of solving mathematical problems. In other words, they define procedural knowledge as knowledge of the syntax, steps conventions and rules for manipulating symbols. Many of the procedures that students possess probably are chains of prescriptions for manipulating symbols. In their definition, procedural knowledge includes algorithms, which means if one executes the procedural steps in a predetermined order and without errors, one is guaranteed to get the solutions, but not includes heuristics, which are abstract, sophisticated and deep procedures knowledge that are tremendously powerful assets in problem solving. Therefore, Star (2005) proposed a reconceptualization of procedural knowledge, suggesting that it can be either superficial, like ones mentioned in Hiebert and Lefevre (1986), or deep. Deep procedural knowledge is associated with comprehension, flexibility and critical judgement. For example, the goals and subgoals of steps, the environment or type of situation for certain procedure, and the constraints imposed upon the procedure by the environment. Research on procedural flexibility development indicates flexibility as an indicator for deep procedural knowledge. Individuals with superficial procedural knowledge can only use standard technique, which might lead to low efficiency solutions and probably inability to solve novel questions. However, more flexible solvers, with a deep procedural knowledge, can navigate their way through domain, using techniques other than ones that are over-practiced, and find the best match solutions for different conditions and goals.

== Development ==
Procedural knowledge is also often entangled with declarative knowledge, even though it occurs mostly for well-defined and explicit units of knowledge. Some researchers suggested that initial problem solving involves explicitly referring to examples, and participants start with pure example-based processing. The examples illustrate the solution of a similar problem and the problem solver analogically maps the solution of the example onto a solution for the current problem. People make extensive reference to examples even when they are initially taught the rules and principles. It is believed that when people acquire cognitive skills, first an example is encoded as a declarative structure. When participants are tested on their first problems, they have two possible ways to respond. If the example matches the problem they learned, they can simply retrieve the answer. However, if it does not match, they must analogically extend the example. With repeated practice, general rules develop and the specific example is no longer accessed. In this way, knowledge transitions from a declarative form (encoding of examples) to a procedural form (production rules), which is called the adaptive control of thought—rational (ACT-R) theory.

However, on certain occasions, procedural and declarative knowledge can be acquired independently. Research with amnesiac patients found that they can learn motor skills without the ability to recollect the episodes in which they learned them. The research also found that the patients learned and retained the ability to read mirror-reversed words efficiently, yet were severely impaired in recognizing those words. This research gives evidence about the neurological differences between procedural and declarative knowledge. Researchers also found that some normal subjects, like amnesiac patients, showed substantial procedural learning in the absence of explicit declarative knowledge. Even though declarative knowledge may influence performance on a procedural task, procedural and declarative knowledge may be acquired separately and one does not need to have knowledge of one type in order to build the other type. The influence of declarative knowledge may be due to the facilitation of a process of pathway activation that is outside of conscious awareness. If the prime is highly predictive of the target, the amount of facilitation is increased because of an active, conscious, attentional effect that is superimposed on the pathway activation. Therefore, if and when subjects develop explicit declarative knowledge of procedure, they can use this knowledge to form attentional expectancies regarding the next item in this procedure.

== Activation ==
Lashley (1951) proposed that behavioral sequences are typically controlled with central plans, and the structure of the plans is hierarchical. Some evidences also support this hypothesis. Same behaviors can have different functional interpretations depending on the context in which they occur. The same sound pattern can be interpreted differently depending on where it occurs in a sentence, for example, there and their. Such contextual dependence is only possible with functionally overarching states of the sort implied by hierarchical plans. The initiation time of a movement sequence and the inter-response times of the sequence elements can increase with its length. Further, inter-response times can depend on the size of the phrase that is about to be generated. The larger the phrase, the longer the inter-response time. Such data have been interpreted in terms of decoding or unpacking hierarchical plans into their constituents. Moreover, learning difficulties changes with the easiness of behavioral sequences. Finally, long-term learning of skills is naturally characterized by the process of forming ever larger hierarchical units or chunks. People learn control structures for successively larger units of behavior, with newly learned routines calling up or relying on more elementary routines, like learning to play simple notes before being able to play a piano concerto.

As for process of behavior plan forming, Rosenhaum et al. (2007) proposed that plans are not formed from scratch for each successive movement sequence but instead are formed by making whatever changes are needed to distinguish the movement sequence to be performed next from the movement sequence that has just been performed. There are evidences found that motor planning occurs by changing features of successively needed motor plans. Also, Rosenhaum et al. (2007) found that even single movements appear to be controlled with hierarchically organized plans, with starting and goal postures at the top level and intermediate states comprising the transition from the starting to the goal at the lower level.

== Interaction with conceptual knowledge ==
The most common understanding in relation to the procedural and conceptual knowledge is of the contrast of knowing how and knowing that. Some see the distinction as a contrast between the tacit knowledge of technology and the explicit knowledge of science. Conceptual knowledge allows us to explain why, hence the distinction of "know how" and "know why". Conceptual knowledge is concerned with relationships among items of knowledge, such that when students can identify these links, it means they have conceptual understanding. Cognitive psychologists also use the term declarative knowledge to contrast it with procedural knowledge, and define it as "knowledge of facts". However, declarative knowledge may be a collection of unrelated facts, whereas conceptual knowledge puts the focus on relationships. Also, declarative knowledge is an inert form of knowledge which contrasted with procedural knowledge as an active form, but conceptual knowledge can be part of an active process. Therefore, it is important to know that conceptual knowledge is not simply factual knowledge but consists of ideas that give some power to thinking about technological activity.

Evidence from mathematics learning research supports the idea that conceptual understanding plays a role in generation and adoption of procedures. Children with greater conceptual understanding tend to have greater procedural skill. Conceptual understanding precedes procedural skill. Instruction about concepts as well as procedures can lead to increased procedural skill. And increasing conceptual knowledge leads to procedure generation. However, this relationship is not unidirectional. Conceptual and procedural knowledge develop iteratively, but the conceptual knowledge may have a greater influence on procedural knowledge than the reverse. Conceptual instruction led to increased conceptual understanding and to generation and transfer of a correct procedure. Procedural instruction led to increased conceptual understanding and to adoption, but only limited transfer, of the instructed procedure.

== Technical uses of the phrase ==
=== Artificial intelligence ===
In artificial intelligence, procedural knowledge is a type of knowledge that can be possessed by an intelligent agent. Such knowledge is often represented as a partial or complete finite-state machine or computer program. A well-known example is the procedural reasoning system, which might, in the case of a mobile robot that navigates in a building, contain procedures such as "navigate to a room" or "plan a path". In contrast, an AI system based on declarative knowledge might just contain a map of the building, together with information about the basic actions that can be done by the robot (like moving forward, turning, and stopping), and leave it to a domain-independent planning algorithm to discover how to use those actions to achieve the agent's goals.

=== Cognitive psychology ===
In cognitive psychology, procedural knowledge is the knowledge exercised in performing a task, and thus includes knowledge which, unlike declarative knowledge, cannot be easily articulated by the individual, since it is typically subconscious (or tacit). Many times, the individual learns procedural knowledge without being aware that they are learning. For example, most individuals can easily recognize a specific face as attractive or a specific joke as funny, but they cannot explain how exactly they arrived at that conclusion or they cannot provide a working definition of attractiveness or being funny. This example illustrates the difference between procedural knowledge and the ordinary notion of knowing how, a distinction which is acknowledged by many cognitive psychologists.

Ordinarily, we would not say that one who is able to recognize a face as attractive is one who knows how to recognize a face as attractive. One knows how to recognize faces as attractive no more than one knows how to recognize certain arrangements of leptons, quarks, etc. as tables. Recognizing faces as attractive, like recognizing certain arrangements of leptons, quarks, etc. as tables, is simply something that one does, or is able to do. It is, therefore, an instance of procedural knowledge, but it is not an instance of know-how. In many cases, both forms of knowledge are subconscious.

For instance, research by cognitive psychologist Pawel Lewicki has shown that procedural knowledge can be acquired by subconscious processing of information about covariations.

=== Educational implications ===
In the classroom, procedural knowledge is part of the prior knowledge of a student. In the context of formal education procedural knowledge is what is learned about learning strategies. It can be the "tasks specific rules, skills, actions, and sequences of actions employed to reach goals" a student uses in the classroom. As an example for procedural knowledge Cauley refers to how a child learns to count on their hands and/or fingers when first learning math. The Unified Learning Model explicates that procedural knowledge helps make learning more efficient by reducing the cognitive load of the task. In some educational approaches, particularly when working with students with learning disabilities, educators perform a task analysis followed by explicit instruction with the steps needed to accomplish the task.

One advantage of procedural knowledge is that it can involve more senses, such as hands-on experience, practice at solving problems, understanding of the limitations of a specific solution, etc. Thus procedural knowledge can frequently eclipse theory.

One limitation of procedural knowledge is its job-dependent nature. As a result, it tends to be less general than declarative knowledge. For example, a computer expert might have knowledge about a computer algorithm in multiple languages, or in pseudo-code, but a Visual Basic programmer might know only about a specific implementation of that algorithm, written in Visual Basic. Thus the 'hands-on' expertise and experience of the Visual Basic programmer might be of commercial value only to Microsoft job-shops, for example.

=== Intellectual property law ===
In intellectual property law, procedural knowledge is a parcel of closely held information relating to industrial technology, sometimes also referred to as a trade secret which enables its user to derive commercial benefit from it. In some legal systems, such procedural knowledge has been considered the intellectual property of a company, and can be transferred when that company is purchased. It is a component of the intellectual property rights on its own merits in most legislations but most often accompanies the license to the right-of-use of patents or trademarks owned by the party releasing it for circumscribed use. Procedural knowledge is not however solely composed of secret information that is not in the public domain; it is a "bundled" parcel of secret and related non-secret information which would be novel to an expert in the field of its usage.

=== Industrial know-how ===
In the context of industrial property (now generally viewed as intellectual property or IP), know-how is a component in the transfer of technology in national and international environments, co-existing with or separate from other IP rights such as patents, trademarks and copyright and is an economic asset. When it is transferred by itself, know-how should be converted into a trade secret before transfer in a legal agreement.

Know-how can be defined as confidentially held, or better, closely held information in the form of unpatented inventions, formulae, designs, drawings, procedures and methods, together with accumulated skills and experience in the hands of a licensor firm's professional personnel which could assist a transferee/licensee of the object product in its manufacture and use and bring to it a competitive advantage. It can be further supported with privately maintained expert knowledge on the operation, maintenance, use/application of the object product and of its sale, usage or disposition.

The inherent proprietary value of know-how is embedded in the legal protection afforded to trade secrets in general law, particularly, case law. Know-how, in short, is private intellectual property which can be said to be a form of precursor to other intellectual property rights. The trade secret law varies from country to country, unlike the case for patents, trademarks and copyright for which there are formal conventions through which subscribing countries grant the same protection to the property as the others; examples of which are the Paris Convention for the Protection of Industrial Property and the World Intellectual Property Organization (WIPO), under United Nations, a supportive organization designed "to encourage creative activity, [and] to promote the protection of intellectual property throughout the world".

The World Trade Organization defined a trade secret by the following criteria:

Natural and legal persons shall have the possibility of preventing information lawfully within their control from being disclosed to, acquired by, or used by others without their consent in a manner contrary to honest commercial practices (10) so long as such information: (a) is secret in the sense that it is not, as a body or in the precise configuration and assembly of its components, generally known among or readily accessible to persons within the circles that normally deal with the kind of information in question; (b) has commercial value because it is secret; and (c) has been subject to reasonable steps under the circumstances, by the person lawfully in control of the information, to keep it secret.

For purposes of illustration, the following may be a provision in a license agreement serving to define know-how:-

Know-how shall mean technical data, formulas, standards, technical information, specifications, processes, methods, codebooks, raw materials, as well as all information, knowledge, assistance, trade practices and secrets, and improvements thereto, divulged, disclosed, or in any way communicated to the Licensee under this Agreement, unless such information was, at the time of disclosure, or thereafter becomes part of the general knowledge or literature which is generally available for public use from other lawful sources. The burden of proving that any information disclosed hereunder is not confidential information shall rest on the licensee.

=== Disclosure agreements ===
There are two sets of agreements associated with the transfer of know-how agreement: disclosure and non-disclosure agreements, which are not separately parts of the principal know-how agreement.

The initial need for disclosure is due to the requirement of a licensee firm to know what is the specific, unique, or general content of the know-how that a licensor firm possesses that promises value to the licensee on entering into a contract. Disclosure also aids the potential licensee in selecting among competitive offers, if any. Such disclosures are made by licensors only under non-disclosure or confidentiality agreements in which there are express undertakings that should the ultimate license not materialize, the firm to whom the disclosure is made will not reveal, or by any manner apply, any part of the disclosed knowledge which is not in the public domain or previously known to the firm receiving the information.

Non-disclosure agreements are undertaken by those who receive confidential information from the licensee, relating to licensed know-how, so as to perform their tasks. Among them are the personnel of engineering firms who construct the plant for the licensee or those who are key employees of the licensee who have detailed access to disclosed data, etc. to administer their functions in operating the know-how-based plant. These are also in the nature of confidentiality agreements and carry the definition of know-how, in full or truncated part, on a need-to-know basis.

=== Employee knowledge ===
Under English law, employees have duties of good faith and fidelity until their employment ceases, whence only the former still applies.

It is sometimes unclear what forms of "know how" that was divulged to an employee in order to carry out their functions and then becomes their own knowledge rather than a secret of their previous employer. Some employers will specify in their employment contracts that a grace period will apply to know how that starts when a person leaves them as an employee.

Specifying exactly what information this includes would increase the likelihood of it being upheld in court in the event of a breach, i.e. saying "when your employment contract is terminated, you must keep all information about your previous employment with us secret for four years" would be difficult to support because that person has to be able to use the skills and knowledge they learnt to gain employment elsewhere.

== See also ==
- Algorithm
- Descriptive knowledge
- Descriptive research
- Discipline
- Experience
- Flow
- Heuristic
- How-to
- Hyperfocus
- Idea
- Imperative mood
- Implicit memory
- Inquiry
- Intuition
- Knowledge by acquaintance
- Knowledge tags
- Mentorship
- Methods of obtaining knowledge
- Muscle memory
- Motor learning
- Motor skill
- Normative science
- Procedural memory
- Process philosophy
- Scientific method
- Techne
- Trial and error
- Tribal knowledge
