= Gettier problem =

Philosophical problem about what constitutes knowledge

In the field of epistemology, the Gettier problem is a landmark philosophical problem concerning the understanding of descriptive knowledge. Attributed to American philosopher Edmund Gettier, Gettier-type counterexamples (called "Gettier-cases") challenge the long-held notion of knowledge as justified true belief (JTB). The JTB account holds that knowledge is equivalent to justified true belief; if all three conditions (justification, truth, and belief) are met by a given claim, then there is knowledge of that claim. In his 1963 three-page paper titled "Is Justified True Belief Knowledge?", Gettier attempts to illustrate by means of two counterexamples that there are cases where individuals can have a justified true belief regarding a claim but still fail to know it because the reasons for the belief, while justified, turn out to be false. Thus, Gettier claims to have shown that the JTB account is inadequate because it does not account for all of the necessary and sufficient conditions for knowledge.

The terms "Gettier problem" and "Gettier case", and the adjective "Gettiered", are sometimes used to describe any case in the field of epistemology that purports to repudiate the JTB account of knowledge.

Responses to Gettier's paper have been numerous. Some reject Gettier's examples as inadequate justification, while others seek to adjust the JTB account of knowledge and blunt the force of these counterexamples. Gettier problems have even found their way into sociological experiments in which researchers have studied intuitive responses to Gettier cases from people of varying demographics.

== History ==
The question of what constitutes "knowledge" is as old as philosophy itself. Early instances are found in Plato's dialogues, notably Meno (97a–98b) and Theaetetus. Gettier himself was not actually the first to raise the problem named after him; its existence was acknowledged by both Alexius Meinong and Bertrand Russell, the latter of whom discussed the problem in his book Human Knowledge: Its scope and limits. In fact, the problem has been known since the Middle Ages, and both Indian philosopher Dharmottara and scholastic logician Peter of Mantua presented examples of it.

Dharmottara, in his commentary c. 770 AD on Dharmakirti's Ascertainment of Knowledge, gives the following two examples:

A fire has just been lit to roast some meat. The fire hasn't started sending up any smoke, but the smell of the meat has attracted a cloud of insects. From a distance, an observer sees the dark swarm above the horizon and mistakes it for smoke. "There's a fire burning at that spot," the distant observer says. Does the observer know that there is a fire burning in the distance?

A desert traveller is searching for water. He sees, in the valley ahead, a shimmering blue expanse. Unfortunately, it's a mirage. But fortunately, when he reaches the spot where there appeared to be water, there actually is water, hidden under a rock. Did the traveller know, as he stood on the hilltop hallucinating, that there was water ahead?

Various theories of knowledge, including some of the proposals that emerged in Western philosophy after Gettier in 1963, were debated by Indo-Tibetan epistemologists before and after Dharmottara. In particular, Gaṅgeśa in the 14th century advanced a detailed causal theory of knowledge.

Russell's case, called the stopped clock case, goes as follows: Alice sees a clock that reads two o'clock and believes that the time is two o'clock. It is, in fact, two o'clock. There's a problem, however: unknown to Alice, the clock she's looking at stopped twelve hours ago. Alice thus has an accidentally true, justified belief. Russell provides an answer of his own to the problem. Edmund Gettier's formulation of the problem was important as it coincided with the rise of the sort of philosophical naturalism promoted by W. V. O. Quine and others, and was used as a justification for a shift towards externalist theories of justification. John L. Pollock and Joseph Cruz have stated that the Gettier problem has "fundamentally altered the character of contemporary epistemology" and has become "a central problem of epistemology since it poses a clear barrier to analyzing knowledge".

Alvin Plantinga rejects the historical analysis:

According to the inherited lore of the epistemological tribe, the JTB [justified true belief] account enjoyed the status of epistemological orthodoxy until 1963, when it was shattered by Edmund Gettier ... Of course, there is an interesting historical irony here: it isn't easy to find many really explicit statements of a JTB analysis of knowledge prior to Gettier. It is almost as if a distinguished critic created a tradition in the very act of destroying it.

Despite this, Plantinga does accept that some philosophers before Gettier have advanced a JTB account of knowledge, specifically C. I. Lewis and A. J. Ayer.

== Knowledge as justified true belief (JTB) ==
The JTB account of knowledge is the claim that knowledge can be conceptually analyzed as justified true belief, which is to say that the meaning of sentences such as "Smith knows that it rained today" can be given with the following set of conditions, which are necessary and sufficient for knowledge to obtain:

A subject S knows that a proposition P is true if and only if:
1. P is true, and
2. S believes that P is true, and
3. S is justified in believing that P is true

The JTB account was first credited to Plato, though Plato argued against this very account of knowledge in the Theaetetus (210a). This account of knowledge is what Gettier subjected to criticism.

== Gettier's two original counterexamples ==
Gettier's paper used counterexamples to argue that there are cases of beliefs that are both true and justified—therefore satisfying all three conditions for knowledge on the JTB account—but that do not appear to be genuine cases of knowledge. Therefore, Gettier argued, his counterexamples show that the JTB account of knowledge is false, and thus that a different conceptual analysis is needed to correctly track what we mean by "knowledge".

Gettier's case is based on two counterexamples to the JTB analysis, both involving a fictional character named Smith. Each relies on two claims. Firstly, that justification is preserved by entailment, and secondly that this applies coherently to Smith's putative "belief". That is, that if Smith is justified in believing P, and Smith realizes that the truth of P entails the truth of Q, then Smith would also be justified in believing Q. Gettier calls these counterexamples "Case I" and "Case II":

=== Case I ===
Suppose that Smith and Jones have applied for a certain job. And suppose that Smith has strong evidence for the following conjunctive proposition: (d) Jones is the man who will get the job, and Jones has ten coins in his pocket.

Smith's evidence for (d) might be that the president of the company assured him that Jones would, in the end, be selected and that he, Smith, had counted the coins in Jones's pocket ten minutes ago. Proposition (d) entails: (e) The man who will get the job has ten coins in his pocket.

Let us suppose that Smith sees the entailment from (d) to (e), and accepts (e) on the grounds of (d), for which he has strong evidence. In this case, Smith is clearly justified in believing that (e) is true.

But imagine, further, that unknown to Smith, he himself, not Jones, will get the job. And, also, unknown to Smith, he himself has ten coins in his pocket. Proposition (e) is true, though proposition (d), from which Smith inferred (e), is false. In our example, then, all of the following are true: (i) (e) is true, (ii) Smith believes that (e) is true, and (iii) Smith is justified in believing that (e) is true. But it is equally clear that Smith does not know that (e) is true; for (e) is true in virtue of the number of coins in Smith's pocket, while Smith does not know how many coins are in his pocket, and bases his belief in (e) on a count of the coins in Jones's pocket, whom he falsely believes to be the man who will get the job.

=== Case II ===
Smith, it is claimed by the hidden interlocutor, has a justified belief that "Jones owns a Ford". Smith therefore (justifiably) concludes (by the rule of disjunction introduction) that "Jones owns a Ford, or Brown is in Barcelona", even though Smith has no information whatsoever about the location of Brown. In fact, Jones does not own a Ford, but by sheer coincidence, Brown really is in Barcelona. Again, Smith had a belief that was true and justified, but not knowledge.

== False premises and generalized Gettier-style problems ==
In both of Gettier's actual examples (see also counterfactual conditional), the justified true belief came about, if Smith's purported claims are disputable, as the result of entailment (but see also material conditional) from justified false beliefs that "Jones will get the job" (in case I), and that "Jones owns a Ford" (in case II). This led some early responses to Gettier to conclude that the definition of knowledge could be easily adjusted, so that knowledge was justified true belief that does not depend on false premises. The interesting issue that arises is then of how to know which premises are in reality false or true when deriving a conclusion, because as in the Gettier cases, one sees that premises can be very reasonable to believe and be likely true, but unknown to the believer there are confounding factors and extra information that may have been missed while concluding something. The question that arises is therefore to what extent would one have to be able to go about attempting to "prove" all premises in the argument before solidifying a conclusion.

=== The generalized problem ===
In a 1966 scenario known as "The sheep in the field", Roderick Chisholm asks us to imagine that someone, X, is standing outside a field looking at something that looks like a sheep (although in fact, it is a dog disguised as a sheep). X believes there is a sheep in the field, and in fact, X is right because there is a sheep behind the hill in the middle of the field. Hence, X has a justified true belief that there is a sheep in the field.

Another scenario by Brian Skyrms is "The Pyromaniac", in which a struck match lights not for the reasons the pyromaniac imagines but because of some unknown "Q radiation".

A different perspective on the issue is given by Alvin Goldman in the "fake barns" scenario (crediting Carl Ginet with the example). In this one, a man is driving in the countryside, and sees what looks exactly like a barn. Accordingly, he thinks that he is seeing a barn. In fact, that is what he is doing. But what he does not know is that the neighborhood generally consists of many fake barns—barn facades designed to look exactly like real barns when viewed from the road. Since, if he had been looking at one of them, he would have been unable to tell the difference, his "knowledge" that he was looking at a barn would seem to be poorly founded.

=== Objections to the "no false premises" approach ===
The "no false premises" (or "no false lemmas") solution which was proposed early in the discussion has been criticized, as more general Gettier-style problems were then constructed or contrived in which the justified true belief is said to not seem to be the result of a chain of reasoning from a justified false belief. For example:

After arranging to meet with Mark for help with homework, Luke arrives at the appointed time and place. Walking into Mark's office Luke clearly sees Mark at his desk; Luke immediately forms the belief "Mark is in the room. He can help me with my logic homework". Luke is justified in his belief; he clearly sees Mark at his desk. In fact, it is not Mark that Luke saw, but rather a hologram, perfect in every respect, giving the appearance of Mark diligently grading papers at his desk. Nevertheless, Mark is in the room; he is crouched under his desk reading Frege. Luke's belief that Mark is in the room is true (he is in the room, under his desk) and justified (Mark's hologram is giving the appearance of Mark hard at work).

It is argued that it seems as though Luke does not "know" that Mark is in the room, even though it is claimed he has a justified true belief that Mark is in the room, but it is not nearly so clear that the perceptual belief that "Mark is in the room" was inferred from any premises at all, let alone any false ones, nor led to significant conclusions on its own; Luke did not seem to be reasoning about anything; "Mark is in the room" seems to have been part of what he seemed to see.

== Constructing Gettier problems ==
The main idea behind Gettier's examples is that the justification for the belief is flawed or incorrect, but the belief turns out to be true by sheer luck. Linda Zagzebski shows that any analysis of knowledge in terms of true belief and some other element of justification that is independent from truth, will be liable to Gettier cases. She offers a formula for generating Gettier cases:

1. start with a case of justified false belief;
2. amend the example, making the element of justification strong enough for knowledge, but the belief false by sheer chance;
3. amend the example again, adding another element of chance such that the belief is true, but which leaves the element of justification unchanged.

This will generate an example of a belief that is sufficiently justified (on some analysis of knowledge) to be knowledge, which is true, and which is intuitively not an example of knowledge. In other words, Gettier cases can be generated for any analysis of knowledge that involves a justification criterion and a truth criterion, which are highly correlated but have some degree of independence.

== Responses to Gettier ==
The Gettier problem is formally a problem in first-order logic, but the introduction by Gettier of terms such as believes and knows moves the discussion into the field of epistemology. Here, the sound (true) arguments ascribed to Smith then need also to be valid (believed) and convincing (justified) if they are to issue in the real-world discussion about justified true belief.

Responses to Gettier problems have fallen into three categories:

- Affirmations of the JTB account: This response affirms the JTB account of knowledge, but rejects Gettier cases. Typically, the proponent of this response rejects Gettier cases because, they say, Gettier cases involve insufficient levels of justification. Knowledge actually requires higher levels of justification than Gettier cases involve.
- Fourth condition responses: This response accepts the problem raised by Gettier cases, and affirms that JTB is necessary (but not sufficient) for knowledge. A proper account of knowledge, according to this type of view, will contain at least fourth condition (JTB + ?). With the fourth condition in place, Gettier counterexamples (and other similar counterexamples) will not work, and we will have an adequate set of criteria that are both necessary and sufficient for knowledge.
- Justification replacement response: This response also accepts the problem raised by Gettier cases. However, instead of invoking a fourth condition, it seeks to replace justification itself with some other third condition (?TB) that will make counterexamples obsolete.

One response, therefore, is that in none of the above cases was the belief justified because it is impossible to justify anything that is not true. Conversely, the fact that a proposition turns out to be untrue is proof that it was not sufficiently justified in the first place. Under this interpretation, the JTB definition of knowledge survives. This shifts the problem to a definition of justification, rather than knowledge. Another view is that justification and non-justification are not in binary opposition. Instead, justification is a matter of degree, with an idea being more or less justified. This account of justification is supported by philosophers such as Paul Boghossian and Stephen Hicks. In common sense usage, an idea can not only be more justified or less justified but it can also be partially justified (e.g. Smith's boss told him X) and partially unjustified (Smith's boss is a liar). Gettier's cases involve propositions that were true and believed, but which had weak justification. In case 1, the premise that the testimony of Smith's boss is "strong evidence" is rejected. The case itself depends on the boss being either wrong or deceitful (Jones did not get the job) and therefore unreliable. In case 2, Smith again has accepted a questionable idea (Jones owns a Ford) with unspecified justification. Without justification, both cases do not undermine the JTB account of knowledge.

Other epistemologists accept Gettier's conclusion. Their responses to the Gettier problem, therefore, consist of trying to find alternative analyses of knowledge.

=== The fourth condition (JTB + G) approaches ===
The most common direction for this sort of response to take is what might be called a "JTB + G" analysis: that is, an analysis based on finding some fourth condition, when added to the conditions of justification, truth, and belief, will yield a set of separately necessary and jointly sufficient conditions.

==== Goldman's causal theory ====
One such response is that of Alvin Goldman (1967), who suggested the addition of a causal condition: a subject's belief is justified, for Goldman, only if the truth of a belief has caused the subject to have that belief (in the appropriate way); and for a justified true belief to count as knowledge, the subject must also be able to "correctly reconstruct" (mentally) that causal chain. Goldman's analysis would rule out Gettier cases in that Smith's beliefs are not caused by the truths of those beliefs; it is merely accidental that Smith's beliefs in the Gettier cases happen to be true, or that the prediction made by Smith: "The winner of the job will have 10 coins", on the basis of his putative belief (see also bundling) came true in this one case. This theory is challenged by the difficulty of giving a principled explanation of how an appropriate causal relationship differs from an inappropriate one (without the circular response of saying that the appropriate sort of causal relationship is the knowledge-producing one); or retreating to a position in which justified true belief is weakly defined as the consensus of learned opinion. The latter would be useful, but not as useful or desirable as the unchanging definitions of scientific concepts such as momentum. Thus, adopting a causal response to the Gettier problem usually requires one to adopt (as Goldman gladly does) some form of reliabilism about justification.

==== Lehrer–Paxson's defeasibility condition ====
Keith Lehrer and Thomas Paxson (1969) proposed another response, by adding a defeasibility condition to the JTB analysis. On their account, knowledge is undefeated justified true belief—which is to say that a justified true belief counts as knowledge if and only if it is also the case that there is no further truth that, had the subject known it, would have defeated their present justification for the belief. (Thus, for example, Smith's justification for believing that the person who will get the job has ten coins in his pocket is his justified belief that Jones will get the job, combined with his justified belief that Jones has ten coins in his pocket. But if Smith had known the truth that Jones will not get the job, that would have defeated the justification for his belief.)

=== Revisions of JTB approaches ===
The difficulties involved in producing a viable fourth condition have led to claims that attempting to repair the JTB account is a deficient strategy. For example, one might argue that what the Gettier problem shows is not the need for a fourth independent condition in addition to the original three, but rather that the attempt to build up an account of knowledge by conjoining a set of independent conditions was misguided from the outset. Those who have adopted this approach generally argue that epistemological terms like justification, evidence, certainty, etc. should be analyzed in terms of a primitive notion of knowledge, rather than vice versa. Knowledge is understood as factive, that is, as embodying a sort of epistemological "tie" between a truth and a belief. The JTB account is then criticized for trying to get and encapsulate the factivity of knowledge "on the cheap", as it were, or via a circular argument, by replacing an irreducible notion of factivity with the conjunction of some of the properties that accompany it (in particular, truth and justification). Of course, the introduction of irreducible primitives into a philosophical theory is always problematic (some would say a sign of desperation), and such anti-reductionist accounts are unlikely to please those who have other reasons to hold fast to the method behind JTB+G accounts.

==== Fred Dretske's conclusive reasons and Robert Nozick's truth-tracking ====
Fred Dretske developed an account of knowledge which he called "conclusive reasons", revived by Robert Nozick as what he called the subjunctive or truth-tracking account. Nozick's formulation posits that proposition p is an instance of knowledge if and only if:

1. P is true, and
2. S believes that P is true, and
3. If P were true, S would believe that P is true, and
4. If P were not true, S would not believe that P is true.

Nozick's definition is intended to preserve Goldman's intuition that Gettier cases should be ruled out by disacknowledging "accidentally" true justified beliefs, but without risking the potentially onerous consequences of building a causal requirement into the analysis. This tactic though, invites the riposte that Nozick's account merely hides the problem and does not solve it, for it leaves open the question of why Smith would not have had his belief if it had been false. The most promising answer seems to be that it is because Smith's belief was caused by the truth of what he believes; but that puts us back in the causalist camp. The third condition has come to be known as epistemological safety, while the fourth has come to be known as epistemological sensitivity.

Criticisms and counter examples (notably the Grandma case) prompted a revision, which resulted in the alteration of (3) and (4) to limit themselves to the same method (i.e. vision):

1. P is true, and
2. S believes that P is true, and
3. If P were true, S (using method M) would believe that P is true, and
4. If P were not true, S (using method M) would not believe that P is true.

Saul Kripke has pointed out that this view remains problematic and uses a counterexample called the Fake Barn Country example, which describes a certain locality containing a number of fake barns or facades of barns. In the midst of these fake barns is one real barn, which is painted red. All the fake barns are not painted red.

Jones is driving along the highway, looks up and happens to see the real barn, and so forms the belief:

I see a barn.

Though Jones has gotten lucky, he could have just as easily been deceived and not have known it. Therefore, it does not fulfill condition 4, for if Jones had seen a fake barn he would not have had any idea it was a fake barn. So, even on the revised account, Jones does not know that he sees a barn.

However, Jones could look up and form the belief:

I see a red barn.

This meets all four conditions of Nozick's account, and therefore Jones knows that he sees a red barn. Thus, Nozick is committed to the view that Jones knows that he sees a red barn, but does not know that he sees a barn. This violates the principle of epistemic closure, which states that one is always in a position to know the consequences of what one knows. Thus, since Jones knows that he sees a red barn, and it is a consequence of him seeing a red barn that he sees a barn, by epistemic closure he should be in a position to know that he sees a barn – but Nozick denies this. Adopting Nozick's view therefore requires rejecting epistemic closure, which is often seen as an unacceptable cost.

=== Robert Fogelin's perspectival account ===
In the first chapter of his book Pyrronian Reflexions on Truth and Justification, Robert Fogelin gives a diagnosis that leads to a dialogical solution to Gettier's problem. The problem always arises when the given justification has nothing to do with what really makes the proposition true. Now, he notes that in such cases there is always a mismatch between the information available to the person who makes the knowledge-claim of some proposition p and the information available to the evaluator of this knowledge-claim (even if the evaluator is the same person in a later time). A Gettierian counterexample arises when the justification given by the person who makes the knowledge-claim cannot be accepted by the knowledge evaluator because it does not fit with his wider informational setting. For instance, in the case of the fake barn the evaluator knows that a superficial inspection from someone who does not know the peculiar circumstances involved is not a justification acceptable as making the proposition p (that it is a real barn) true.

==== Richard Kirkham's skepticism ====
Richard Kirkham has proposed that it is best to start with a definition of knowledge so strong that giving a counterexample to it is logically impossible. Whether it can be weakened without becoming subject to a counterexample should then be checked. He concludes that there will always be a counterexample to any definition of knowledge in which the believer's evidence does not logically necessitate the belief. Since in most cases the believer's evidence does not necessitate a belief, Kirkham embraces skepticism about knowledge; but he notes that a belief can still be rational even if it is not an item of knowledge.

=== Attempts to dissolve the problem ===
One might respond to Gettier by finding a way to avoid his conclusion(s) in the first place. However, it can hardly be argued that knowledge is justified true belief if there are cases that are justified true belief without being knowledge; thus, those who want to avoid Gettier's conclusions have to find some way to defuse Gettier's counterexamples. In order to do so, within the parameters of the particular counter-example or exemplar, they must then either accept that

1. Gettier's cases are not really cases of justified true belief, or
2. Gettier's cases really are cases of knowledge after all,

or demonstrate a case in which it is possible to circumvent surrender to the exemplar by eliminating any necessity for it to be considered that JTB apply in just those areas that Gettier has rendered obscure, without thereby lessening the force of JTB to apply in those cases where it actually is crucial. Then, though Gettier's cases stipulate that Smith has a certain belief and that his belief is true, it seems that in order to propose (1), one must argue that Gettier, (or, that is, the writer responsible for the particular form of words on this present occasion known as case (1), and who makes assertion's about Smith's "putative" beliefs), goes wrong because he has the wrong notion of justification. Such an argument often depends on an externalist account on which "justification" is understood in such a way that whether or not a belief is "justified" depends not just on the internal state of the believer, but also on how that internal state is related to the outside world. Externalist accounts typically are constructed such that Smith's putative beliefs in Case I and Case II are not really justified (even though it seems to Smith that they are), because his beliefs are not lined up with the world in the right way, or that it is possible to show that it is invalid to assert that "Smith" has any significant "particular" belief at all, in terms of JTB or otherwise. Such accounts, of course, face the same burden as causalist responses to Gettier: they have to explain what sort of relationship between the world and the believer counts as a justificatory relationship.

Those who accept (2) are by far in the minority in analytic philosophy; generally, those who are willing to accept it are those who have independent reasons to say that more things count as knowledge than the intuitions that led to the JTB account would acknowledge. Chief among these is epistemic minimalists, such as Crispin Sartwell, who hold that all true belief, including both Gettier's cases and lucky guesses, counts as knowledge.

For his part, Nolbert Briceño, a Venezuelan lawyer, wrote an article entitled "Refutation of the Gettier Problem", where he analyzes Edmund Gettier's reasoning as expressed in his article and claims to demonstrate the errors committed by the latter, thus defending the definition of knowledge given by Plato.

=== Experimental research ===
Some early work in the field of experimental philosophy suggested that traditional intuitions about Gettier cases might vary cross-culturally. However, subsequent studies have consistently failed to replicate these results, instead finding that participants from different cultures do share the traditional intuition. More recent studies have been providing evidence for the opposite hypothesis, that people from a variety of different cultures have similar intuitions in these cases.

== See also ==
- Knowledge-first epistemology – 2000 philosophical book by Timothy Williamson
- Münchhausen trilemma – Thought experiment used to demonstrate the impossibility of proving any truth
