= Richard Kirkham =

American philosopher (born 1955)

Richard Ladd Kirkham (born June 18, 1955) is an American philosopher. Among his published works are Theories of Truth (his most-cited work, published by MIT Press in 1992), "Does the Gettier Problem Rest on a Mistake?" Mind (1984. Vol. 93, No. 372), and "On Paradoxes and a Surprise Exam" Philosophia (1991).

== Education ==
Kirkham graduated from Cornell College in 1977 and received his Ph.D. from the University of Notre Dame in 1983.

== Philosophical work ==
Kirkham is probably best known for his work on analytic theories of truth. His 1992 book Theories of Truth: A Critical Introduction was received positively upon release. In the book, Kirkham proposes that the various theories of truth proposed through the centuries are really not all in competition with one another after all, because they are often intended to answer distinct questions about truth. For example, some have been intended only to provide the extensional necessary and sufficient conditions for truth, while others have been intended to provide a definition of truth, and still others are intended only to explain the linguistic and non-linguistic purposes of statements that predicate truth or falsity. According to MIT Press, this book is their all-time best-selling work in analytic philosophy and nearly half of all English-reading professional philosophers in the world own a personal copy of the book. It has been used as a text in graduate seminars on every inhabited continent and translated into Portuguese and Russian.

He is also the author of four articles in the Routledge Encyclopedia of Philosophy (Routledge, 1998).

== See also ==
- American philosophy
- Gettier problem
- Liar paradox
