= Edmund Gettier =

American philosopher (1927–2021)

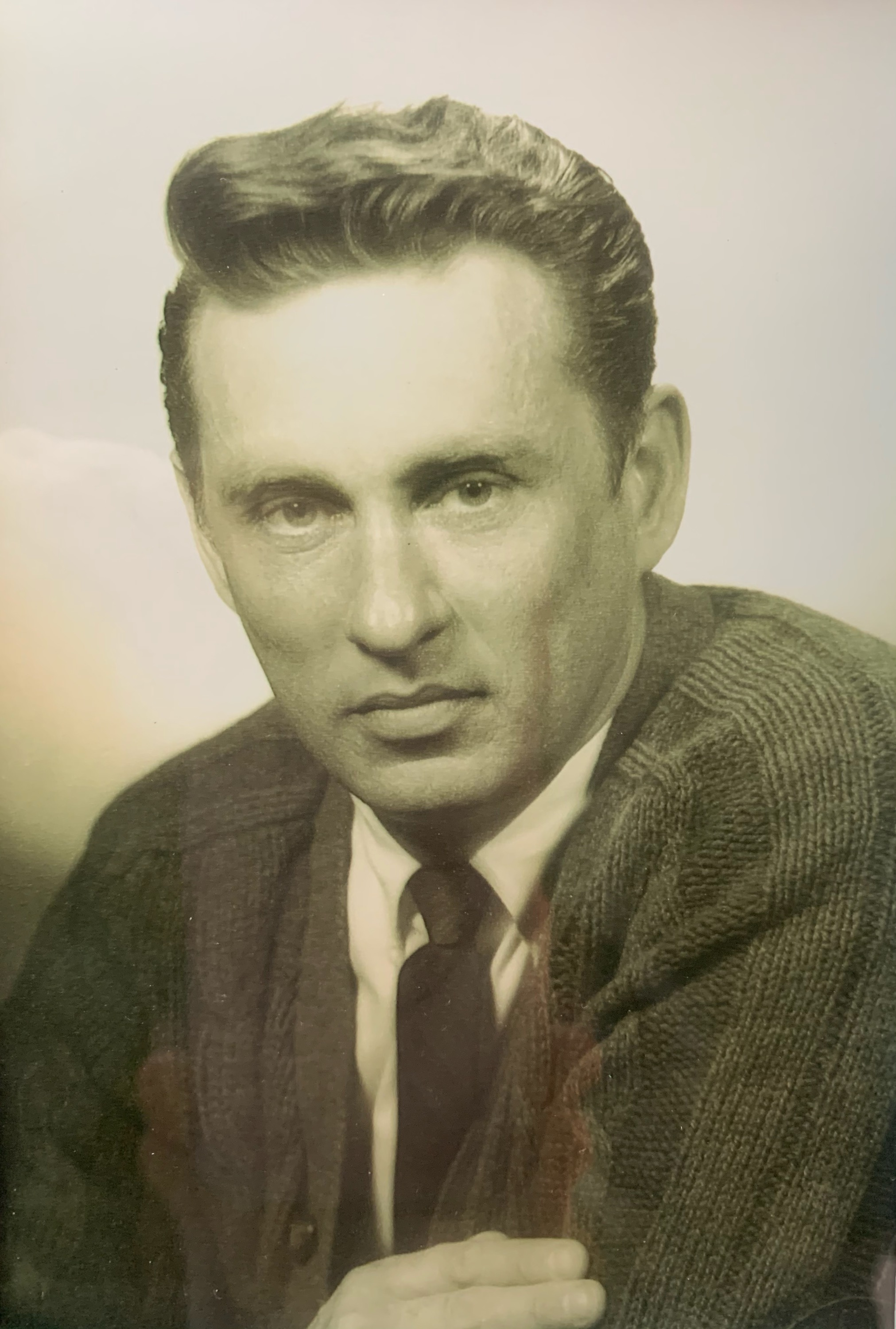
- Gettier c. 1960s
- Born: Edmund Lee Gettier III; October 31, 1927; Baltimore, Maryland, U.S.
- Died: March 23, 2021 (aged 93)

Education
- Education: Johns Hopkins University (BA, 1949); Cornell University (PhD, 1961)
- Doctoral advisor: Norman Malcolm

Philosophical work
- Era: Contemporary philosophy
- Region: Western philosophy
- School: Analytic philosophy
- Institutions: Wayne State University; University of Pittsburgh; University of Massachusetts Amherst
- Main interests: Epistemology
- Notable ideas: Gettier problem

Edmund Lee Gettier III (/ˈɡɛtiər/ GET-ee-er; October 31, 1927 – March 23, 2021) was an American philosopher at the University of Massachusetts Amherst. He is best known for authoring the 1963 article: "Is Justified True Belief Knowledge?", which has generated an extensive philosophical literature trying to respond to what would become known as the Gettier problem.

== Biography ==
=== Early life and education ===
Edmund Lee Gettier III was born on October 31, 1927, in Baltimore, Maryland.

Gettier obtained his B.A. from Johns Hopkins University in 1949. He earned his PhD in philosophy from Cornell University in 1961 with a dissertation on “Bertrand Russell’s Theories of Belief” written under the supervision of Norman Malcolm.

=== Professorship ===
Gettier taught philosophy at Wayne State University from 1957 until 1967 initially as an Instructor, then as an assistant professor, and, latterly, as an associate professor. His philosophical colleagues at Wayne State included, among others, Alvin Plantinga and Héctor-Neri Castaneda.

In the academic year of 1964–65, he held a postdoctoral Mellon Fellowship at the University of Pittsburgh. His recorded field of research was "Bertrand Russell's theories of belief, and their effect on contemporary thought." While at Pittsburgh, he met a young Bas C. Van Fraasen and published his first and only book review of John Passmore's Philosophical Reasoning.

In 1967, Gettier was recruited to the faculty of philosophy at the University of Massachusetts Amherst and was promoted to full professor there in 1972. He taught there until his retirement, as professor emeritus in 2001.

=== Death ===
Gettier died on March 23, 2021, aged 93.

== Philosophy ==
Gettier's fame rests on a three-page article, published in Analysis in 1963, that remains one of the most famous in recent philosophical history. In it, Gettier challenges the definition of knowledge as "justified true belief" that dates back to Plato's Theaetetus but is discounted at the end of that very dialogue. This account was accepted by most philosophers at the time, most prominently the epistemologist Clarence Irving Lewis and his student Roderick Chisholm. Gettier's article offered counterexamples to this account in the form of cases in which subjects had true beliefs that were also justified but for which the beliefs were true for reasons unrelated to the justification. Some philosophers, however, thought the definition of knowledge as justified true belief had already been questioned in a general way by the work of Wittgenstein. (Later, a similar argument was found in the papers of Bertrand Russell.)

=== Gettier problem ===
Gettier provides several examples of beliefs that are both true and justified, but that we should not intuitively term "knowledge". Cases of this sort are termed "Gettier (counter-)examples". Because Gettier's criticism of the justified true belief model is systemic, some of his examples that demonstrate the philosophical issues lack practical plausibility; for example, one scenario hypothesizes that one job-seeking candidate is somehow aware of exactly how many coins are in the other candidate's pocket. Accordingly, other authors have imagined more realistic and plausible counterexamples.

For example: I am watching the men's Wimbledon Final, and John McEnroe is playing Jimmy Connors; it is match point, and McEnroe wins. I say to myself: "John McEnroe is this year's men's champion at Wimbledon". Unbeknownst to me, however, the BBC were experiencing a broadcasting fault and so had broadcast a tape of last year's final, when McEnroe beat Connors. I had been watching last year's Wimbledon final, so I believed that McEnroe had bested Connors. But at that same time, in real life, McEnroe was repeating last year's victory and besting Connors. So my belief that McEnroe bested Connors to become this year's Wimbledon champion is true, and I had good reason to believe so (my belief was justified) – and yet, there is a sense in which I could not really have claimed to "know" that McEnroe had bested Connors because I was only accidentally right that McEnroe beat Connors – my belief was not based on the right kind of justification.

Gettier inspired a great deal of work by philosophers attempting to recover a working definition of knowledge. Major responses include:

- Gettier's use of "justification" is too general, and only some kinds of justification count.
- Gettier's examples do not count as justification at all, and only some kinds of evidence are justificatory.
- Knowledge must have a fourth condition, such as "no false premises" or "indefeasibility".
- Robert Nozick suggests knowledge must consist of justified true belief that is "truth-tracking" — a belief such that if it were revealed to be false, it would not have been believed, and conversely.
- Colin McGinn suggests that knowledge is atomic (it is not divisible into smaller components). We have knowledge when we have knowledge, and an accurate definition of knowledge may even contain the word "knowledge".

A 2001 study by Weinberg, Nichols, and Stich suggests that the effect of the Gettier problem varies by culture. In particular, people from Western countries seem more likely to agree with the judgments described in the story than do those from East Asia. Subsequent studies failed to replicate these results.

According to philosopher Duncan Pritchard, Gettier wrote his paper in a bid to get tenure and had little interest in epistemology: he never published anything else in the field, and declined to attend a 2013 University of Edinburgh conference celebrating the 50th anniversary of the publication of his seminal article.

== Works ==
- "Is Justified True Belief Knowledge?" Analysis, Vol. 23, pp. 121–123 (1963). doi:10.1093/analys/23.6.121
- "Review: [Untitled]" The Philosophical Review 74, no. 2 (1965): 266–69 (review of Philosophical Reasoning by John Passmore). https://doi.org/10.2307/2183277
- “Comments on A. J. Ayer’s ‘The Concept of a Person’,” in Intentionality, Minds, and Perception: Discussions on Contemporary Philosophy, ed. Hector-Neri Castañeda (Detroit, 1967).

== See also ==
- American philosophy
