= John Hawthorne =

English philosopher (born 1964)

John Hawthorne FBA
- Born: John Patrick Hawthorne; 25 May 1964 (age 62); Birmingham, England
- Other name: John O'Leary-Hawthorne

Academic background
- Education: University of Manchester; Syracuse University
- Thesis: Public Meaning and Mental Content (1990)
- Doctoral advisor: Jonathan Bennett
- Influences: William Alston; Jonathan Bennett; David Lewis; Timothy Williamson

Academic work
- Discipline: Philosophy
- Sub-discipline: Epistemology; metaphysics; philosophy of language
- School or tradition: Analytic philosophy
- Institutions: University of New South Wales; Arizona State University; Syracuse University; Rutgers University; Magdalen College, Oxford; University of Southern California; Australian Catholic University
- Doctoral students: Amia Srinivasan
- Notable ideas: Subject-sensitive invariantism

John Patrick Hawthorne FBA (born 25 May 1964) is an English philosopher, currently serving as Provost Professor of Philosophy and Linda MacDonald Hilf Chair in Philosophy at the University of Southern California. He is recognized as a leading contemporary contributor to metaphysics and epistemology.

== Early life and career ==
Hawthorne was born on 25 May 1964 in Birmingham, England. He earned BA from the University of Manchester and his PhD from Syracuse University, where he studied with William Alston and Jonathan Bennett. From 2006 to 2015, he was the Waynflete Professor of Metaphysical Philosophy at the University of Oxford. He has also taught at the University of New South Wales, Arizona State University, Syracuse University, Rutgers University, Princeton University, and was a member of the Dianoia Institute at Australian Catholic University.

== Philosophical work ==
Hawthorne's 2006 collection Metaphysical Essays offers original treatments of fundamental topics in philosophy, including identity, ontology, vagueness, and causation. It has been called "essential reading for anyone currently engaged in analytic metaphysics."

In his book Knowledge and Lotteries, Hawthorne defends a view in epistemology according to which the presence of knowledge is dependent on the subject's interests; he calls this view "subject-sensitive invariantism".

Hawthorne has also written on philosophy of language and philosophical logic, philosophy of religion, philosophy of mind, and on Gottfried Wilhelm Leibniz.

== Books ==
=== As author ===
- Killing and Other Dastardly Deeds: Hard Problems for Moral Theory (with contributions by Christina Dietz, Vishnu Sridharan, and Yoaav Isaacs, Princeton University Press, 2026)
- The Bounds of Possibility: Puzzles of Modal Variation (with Cian Dorr and Juhani Yli-Vakkuri, Oxford University Press, 2021)
- Narrow Content (with Juhani Yli-Vakkuri, Oxford University Press, 2018)
- The Reference Book (with David Manley, Oxford University Press, 2012)
- Relativism and Monadic Truth (with Herman Cappelen, Oxford University Press, 2010)
- Metaphysical Essays (Oxford University Press, 2006)
- Knowledge and Lotteries (Oxford University Press, 2004)
- Substance and Individuation in Leibniz (with J. A. Cover, Cambridge University Press, 2003)
- The Grammar of Meaning: Normativity and Semantic Discourse (with Mark Norris Lance, Cambridge University Press, 1997)

=== As editor ===
- Conditionals, Paradox, and Probability: Themes from the Philosophy of Dorothy Edgington (edited with Lee Walters, Oxford University Press, 2021)
- Knowledge, Belief, and God: New Insights in Religious Epistemology (edited with Matthew A. Benton and Dani Rabinowitz, Oxford University Press, 2018)
- The Oxford Handbook of Philosophical Methodology (edited with Herman Cappelen and Tamar Gendler, Oxford University Press, 2016)
- Contemporary Debates in Metaphysics (edited with Theodore Sider and Dean Zimmerman, Blackwell, 2007)
- Perceptual Experience (edited with Tamar Gendler, Oxford University Press, 2006)
- Conceivability and Possibility (edited with Tamar Gendler, Oxford University Press, 2002)

Academic offices
Preceded by Dorothy Edgington	Waynflete Professor of Metaphysical Philosophy; 2006–2015	Succeeded by Ofra Magidor
