= Elizabeth Barnes =

American philosopher

Education
- Education: University of St Andrews

Philosophical work
- Era: 21st-century philosophy
- Region: Western philosophy
- School: Analytic philosophy
- Institutions: University of Leeds; University of Virginia
- Main interests: Feminist philosophy, metaphysics, social philosophy, ethics
- Notable works: The Minority Body (2016)

Elizabeth Barnes is an American philosopher working in feminist philosophy, metaphysics, social philosophy and ethics. Barnes is a professor of philosophy at the Corcoran Department of Philosophy, University of Virginia.

== Biography ==
Barnes was born in Asheville, North Carolina, and was raised around Charlotte, North Carolina. Barnes holds a bachelor's degree from the Davidson College, where she graduated magna cum laude, and a master's degree and PhD from the University of St Andrews, where she studied under Katherine Hawley and Daniel Nolan. After graduating from St Andrews, Barnes held posts in the philosophy department at the University of Leeds from 2006, before joining the faculty at Virginia in 2014. In 2012, she became editor-in-chief of the journal Philosophy Compass.

Barnes has published across various fields in philosophy, and edited a volume entitled Current Controversies in Metaphysics, which was published with Routledge in 2015. In 2016, her monograph The Minority Body was published with Oxford University Press. In the book, Barnes challenges the view of disability common in analytic philosophy, arguing instead that it is primarily a social phenomenon. Disabled persons, she argues, are not intrinsically worse off in virtue of being disabled, even though disability can be, in a restricted sense, a harm.

== Personal life ==
She is married to the Scottish philosopher Ross Cameron; the pair met at St Andrews, and Cameron is also a professor at Virginia. Barnes was diagnosed with young onset Parkinsons whilst writing Health Problems: Philosophical Puzzles About the Nature of Health.

== Selected publications ==
=== Books ===
- (2023) Health Problems: Philosophical Puzzles About the Nature of Health. Oxford: Oxford University Press.
- (2016) The Minority Body: A Theory of Disability. Oxford: Oxford University Press.
- (2015, as editor) Current Controversies in Metaphysics. London: Routledge.

=== Articles ===
- (2023) "Trust, Distrust, and ‘Medical Gaslighting’", The Philosophical Quarterly, Volume 73, Issue 3, July 2023, Pages 649–676.
- (2014) "Going Beyond the Fundamental: Feminism in Contemporary Metaphysics", Proceedings of the Aristotelian Society 114 (3), pp. 335–51.
- (2014) "Valuing Disability, Causing Disability", Ethics 125 (1), pp. 88–113.
- (2014) "Fundamental Indeterminacy", Analytic Philosophy 55 (4), pp. 339–62.
- (2013) "Metaphysically Indeterminate Existence", Philosophical Studies 166, pp. 495–510.
- (2012) "Emergence and Fundamentality", Mind 121 (484), pp. 873–901.
- (2011) "Back to the Open Future". Philosophical Perspectives: Metaphysics (25), pp. 1–26. (with Ross Cameron)
- (2011) "A Theory of Metaphysical Indeterminacy", Oxford Studies in Metaphysics (6), pp. 103–48. (with JRG Williams)
- (2011) "Reply to Eklund", Oxford Studies in Metaphysics (6). (with JRG Williams)
- (2010) "Ontic Vagueness: A Guide for the Perplexed", Noûs 44 (4), pp. 607–27.
- (2010) "Arguments Against Metaphysical Indeterminacy". Philosophy Compass (5), pp. 953–64.
- (2009) "Disability and Adaptive Preference", Philosophical Perspectives 23 (1), pp. 1–22.
- (2009) "Vague Parts and Vague Identity", Pacific Philosophical Quarterly 90 (2), pp. 176–87. (with JRG Williams)
- (2009) "The Open Future: Bivalence, Determinism, and Ontology", Philosophical Studies 146 (2), pp. 291–309. (with Ross Cameron)
- (2009) "Disability, Minority and Difference", Journal of Applied Philosophy 26 (4), pp. 337–55.
- (2009) "Indeterminacy, Identity, and Counterparts: Evans Reconsidered", Synthese 168 (1), pp. 81–96.
- (2007) "Vagueness and Arbitrariness: Merricks on Composition", Mind 116 (461), pp. 105–13.
- (2005) "Vagueness in Sparseness: a study in property ontology", Analysis 65 (4), pp. 315–21.
