= Commensurability (ethics) =

Values which cannot be compared

In ethics, two values (or norms, reasons, or goods) are incommensurable (or incommensurate, or incomparable) when they do not share a common standard of measurement or cannot be compared to each other in a certain way.

There is a cluster of related ideas, and many philosophers use the terms differently. On one common usage:

- Two values (for example, freedom and security) are incommensurable when they cannot be 'traded off' against each other: for example, if there is no set amount of freedom that would compensate for a certain loss of security, or vice versa.
- Two options or choices are incommensurate or incomparable if and only if: it is not true that one is better, that the other is better, or that they are exactly equally good.

This page is concerned almost entirely with the second phenomenon. For clarity, the term 'incomparable' is used.

== Trichotomous comparisons and small-improvement arguments ==
In terminology due to Ruth Chang, the three trichotomous comparisons are betterness, worseness, and equal goodness. For example, one artist, drawing, or cup of coffee might be better or worse than another, or precisely equally as good as it.

When two items are incomparable, none of the trichotomous comparisons holds between them (or at least it seems that way).

The clearest way of arguing that two options are incomparable is a small-improvement argument.

The purpose of such examples is to show that none of the trichotomous comparisons apply. Here is an example. Suppose that (for you, taking everything into account) a certain job as a professor and a certain job as a banker are such that neither seems better than the other. The professor job offers more freedom and security, and the banking job offers more money and excitement. But we might say that though they are good in different ways, they are just too different to be compared with one of the trichotomous comparisons.

Let's suppose that this means that the banking job is not better, and the professor job is not better. This seems to rule out two of the three trichotomous comparisons.

But what about the third? Might the jobs be exactly equally good? The small improvement argument is supposed to show that they could not. Suppose for the sake of argument that they are precisely equally good.

Suppose also that in order to tempt you, the bankers offer you a tiny pay rise, perhaps 5 cents a year. This new banking job (often called 'banking+') is clearly better than banking, albeit only by a tiny amount. You could (under normal circumstances) never rationally choose banking over banking+: they are the same in every way, except that the latter pays more.

Here is the crux of the small-improvement argument: if banking is exactly equally as good as professor, and banking+ is better than banking, then banking+ must be better than professor. But this seems very implausible: if banking and professor were so different that we could not say that professor is better, and we could not say that banking is better, then how could adding 5 cents a year to a huge salary make the difference?

This seems to show that one of our assumptions was incorrect. Defenders of incomparability will say it is most plausible that it is the assumption that banking and philosophy are equally good that is incorrect. So they conclude that this assumption as false, and thus that none of the trichotomous comparisons apply.

== Theories of incommensurability ==
There are four main philosophical accounts of incommensurability or incomparability. Their task is to explain (or explain away) the phenomenon, and the small-improvement argument. Some philosophers are pluralists about the phenomenon: they think that (for example) genuine incomparability might be the correct account in some cases, and parity in others.

One way to understand the difference between the theories is to see how they respond to the small-improvement argument.

=== Epistemicism about incomparability ===
One possibility is that this is all a mistake: that there is no genuine incomparability, and when it seems like none of the three trichotomous comparisons apply, in fact one of them does but we do not know which. This is where the small-improvement argument goes wrong: one of the trichotomous comparisons does apply between banking and philosophy.

According to this view, apparent incomparability is merely ignorance. An advantage of this account is that the various puzzles surrounding incomparability dissolve rather quickly. Choice between incomparable options is no more than choice between options when we do not know which is better.

The main objection to this kind of view is that it seems very implausible, for similar reasons to epistemicism about vagueness. In particular, it is hard to see how we could be ignorant of the kinds of facts involved in incomparability.

=== Genuine incomparability ===
Joseph Raz has argued that in cases of incomparability, no comparison applies. Neither option is better, and they are not equally good.

On this view, the small-improvement argument is sound.

John Nolt provides a formal logical treatment of genuine incomparability and related topics in Incomparable Values (see references).

=== Parity ===
Ruth Chang has argued that (at least some of the time), options may be comparable even if they are not trichotomously comparable. She does this by denying that the three trichotomous comparisons are the only ones on offer. She defends the existence of a fourth comparison, which she calls 'parity'. Luke Elson has criticised this argument, claiming that the apparent possibility of parity is really an artefact of the vagueness of the (trichotomous) comparisons involved.

=== Incomparability as vagueness ===
Finally, a set of philosophers led by John Broome has argued that incomparability is vagueness. This theory says that it is vague or indeterminate which trichotomous comparison applies.

The argument for this position is complex, and how 'incomparability as vagueness' is to be understood depends on one's theory of vagueness. But the main idea behind the theory is fairly simple. What is the precise minimum number of grains of sand needed to count as a heap, or hairs required to count as non-bald? If there is no precise number, only a rough range, then these are instances of vagueness. On one set of theories of vagueness, it is indeterminate how many heaps or hairs are required. Perhaps our language simply does not specify a sharp boundary.

In the small-improvement argument, the incomparability as vagueness view might say that it is indeterminate whether banking is better or worse than philosophy, or precisely equally good.

One taxonomic complication is distinguishing the view that incomparability is vagueness, combined with epistemicism about vagueness, from epistemicism about incomparability.

== Philosophical implications of incomparability ==
Incomparability has figured prominently in several philosophical debates concerning moral and rational action. In general, incomparability can add complications to any view according to which one ought to do the best thing that one can, or the better of two options. If the options are incomparable, it may be that neither is better. (Depending on which view of incomparability is true.)

=== Morality ===
Consequentialists think that the morally right thing to do is what promotes the most overall good. But if two actions produce incomparable outcomes, it may be that neither is better.

The topic of incommensurability has also frequently arisen in discussions of the version of natural law theory associated with John Finnis and others.

=== Rational choice ===
Joseph Raz has argued that incommensurability undermines the 'rationalistic' view of human action according to which distinctively rational action is doing what one has most reason to do.

Philosophical reflection about practical reason typically aims for a description of the principles relevant in answering the question, "What is to be done in this or that circumstance?" On one popular view, answers to this question can be found by comparing the relative strengths of the various values or norms in play in some given situation. For example, if one is trying to decide on some nice afternoon whether they should stay in to do work or go for a walk, on this view of practical reason they will compare the merits of these two options. If going for a walk is the better or more reasonable course of action, they should put aside their books and go for a stroll. The topic of incommensurability—and the topic of incomparability in particular—is especially important to those who advocate this view of practical reason. For if one's options in certain circumstances are of incomparable value, they cannot settle the question of what to do by choosing the better option. When the competing options are incomparable, then by definition neither is better than the other.

== See also ==
- Commensurability (philosophy of science)
- Value pluralism
