= Ruth Chang =

American philosopher

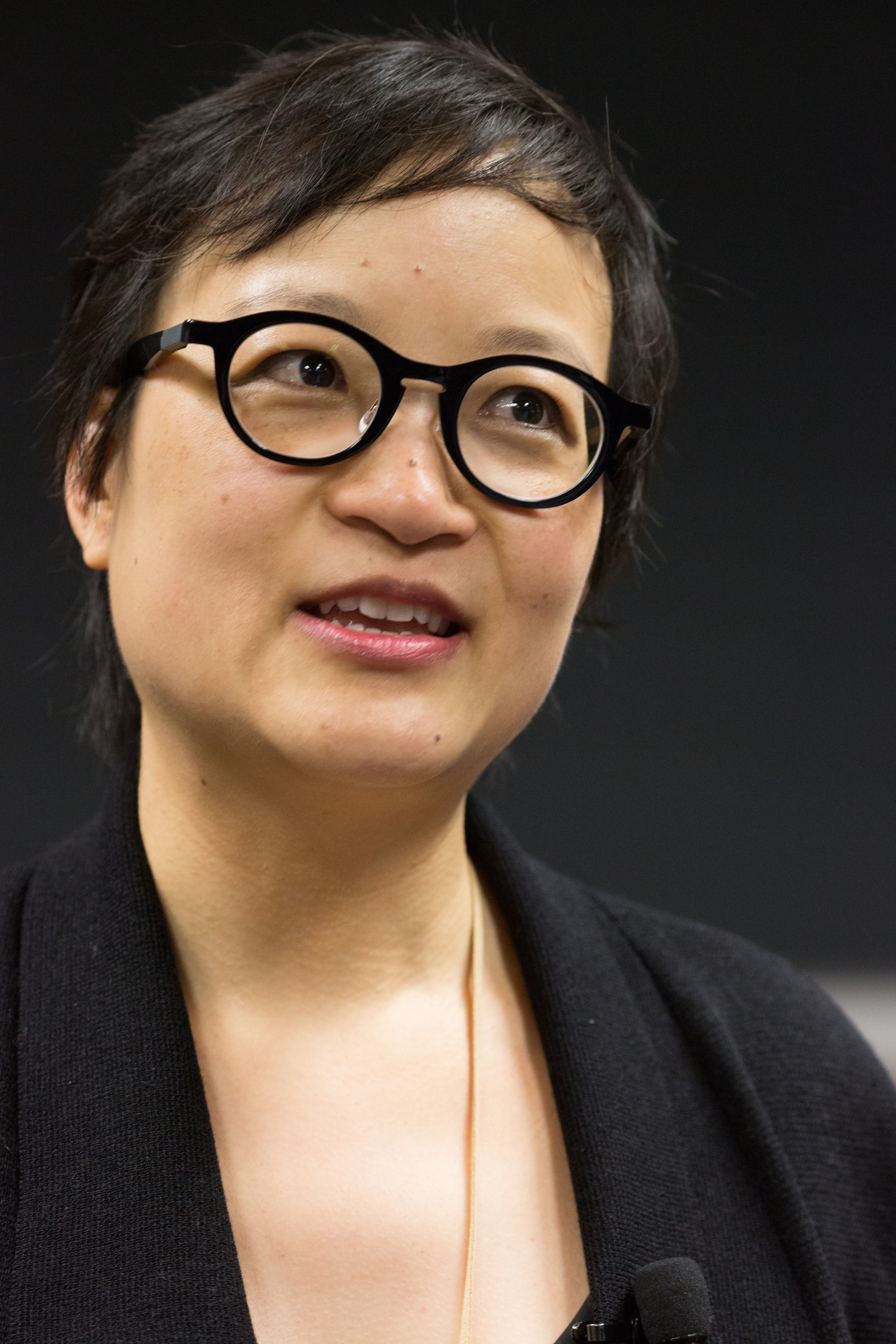
- Chang at the Edmond J. Safra Center for Ethics in 2016
- Born: Minneapolis, Minnesota, U.S.

Education
- Education: Dartmouth College (BA); Harvard University (JD); Balliol College, Oxford (DPhil)
- Thesis: Incomparability and practical reason (1997)
- Doctoral advisor: Derek Parfit

Philosophical work
- Era: Contemporary philosophy
- Region: Western philosophy
- School: Analytic philosophy
- Institutions: Balliol College, Oxford; Rutgers University; University College, Oxford
- Main interests: Normative ethics, metaethics, action theory, moral psychology, decision theory, jurisprudence, ethics of artificial intelligence
- Notable ideas: Parity, hybrid voluntarism

Ruth Chang is an American philosopher and legal scholar who is the Chair and Professor of Jurisprudence at the University of Oxford and a Professorial Fellow of University College, Oxford. She was previously a professor at Rutgers University from 1998 to 2019. She is known for her research on the incommensurability of values and on practical reason and normativity. She is also widely known for her work on decision-making and has lectured or consulted on choice for organizations ranging from video-game and pharmaceutical companies to the U.S. Navy, the World Bank, and the CIA. She was elected a Fellow of the American Academy of Arts and Sciences in 2021.

== Education and career ==
Chang was born in Minneapolis, Minnesota. She graduated from Dartmouth College in 1985 with a Bachelor of Arts in philosophy, summa cum laude, and from Harvard Law School in 1988 with a Juris Doctor, cum laude. After four months of working at a white-shoe law firm in New York City, she left law to pursue graduate studies in philosophy.

She lectured in philosophy at Magdalen College (1990) and Worcester College (1990–91), Oxford. From 1991 she was a junior research fellow at Balliol College, Oxford; during the fellowship she also held visiting appointments in philosophy at UCLA (1993–94) and in law at the University of Chicago Law School (1994–95). She received a Doctor of Philosophy degree from Oxford in 1997. She taught philosophy at Rutgers University from 1998 to 2019, as assistant professor, associate professor (from 2004) and professor (from 2014), and held visiting posts at the Australian National University (2010) and NYU Abu Dhabi (2014). Oxford announced her appointment as Professor of Jurisprudence in 2017, and she took up the chair in 2019.

Chang was a Berggruen Fellow at the Stanford University Center for Advanced Study in the Behavioral Sciences (2016–17) and has received a number of fellowship awards, including at the National Humanities Center (2009–10), the Harvard University Edmond J. Safra Center for Ethics at the Kennedy School of Government (2003–04), the Princeton University Center for Human Values (1999–2000 and 2015–16), and the American Council of Learned Societies (2002–03). She was a fellow of The New Institute in Hamburg (2022–23) and of the Wissenschaftskolleg zu Berlin (2023–24), and in 2025 a Distinguished Visiting Scholar at the John W. Kluge Center of the Library of Congress. She was a Centenary Fellow of the Scots Philosophical Association, which involved a lecture tour around Scotland. Her work has been recognized by a National Endowment for the Humanities Public Scholar Award (2017) and an American Philosophical Association Public Philosophy Op-Ed Prize (2016). She was elected a Fellow of the American Academy of Arts and Sciences in April 2021. In April 2026 she gave the Donnellan Lectures at Trinity College Dublin.

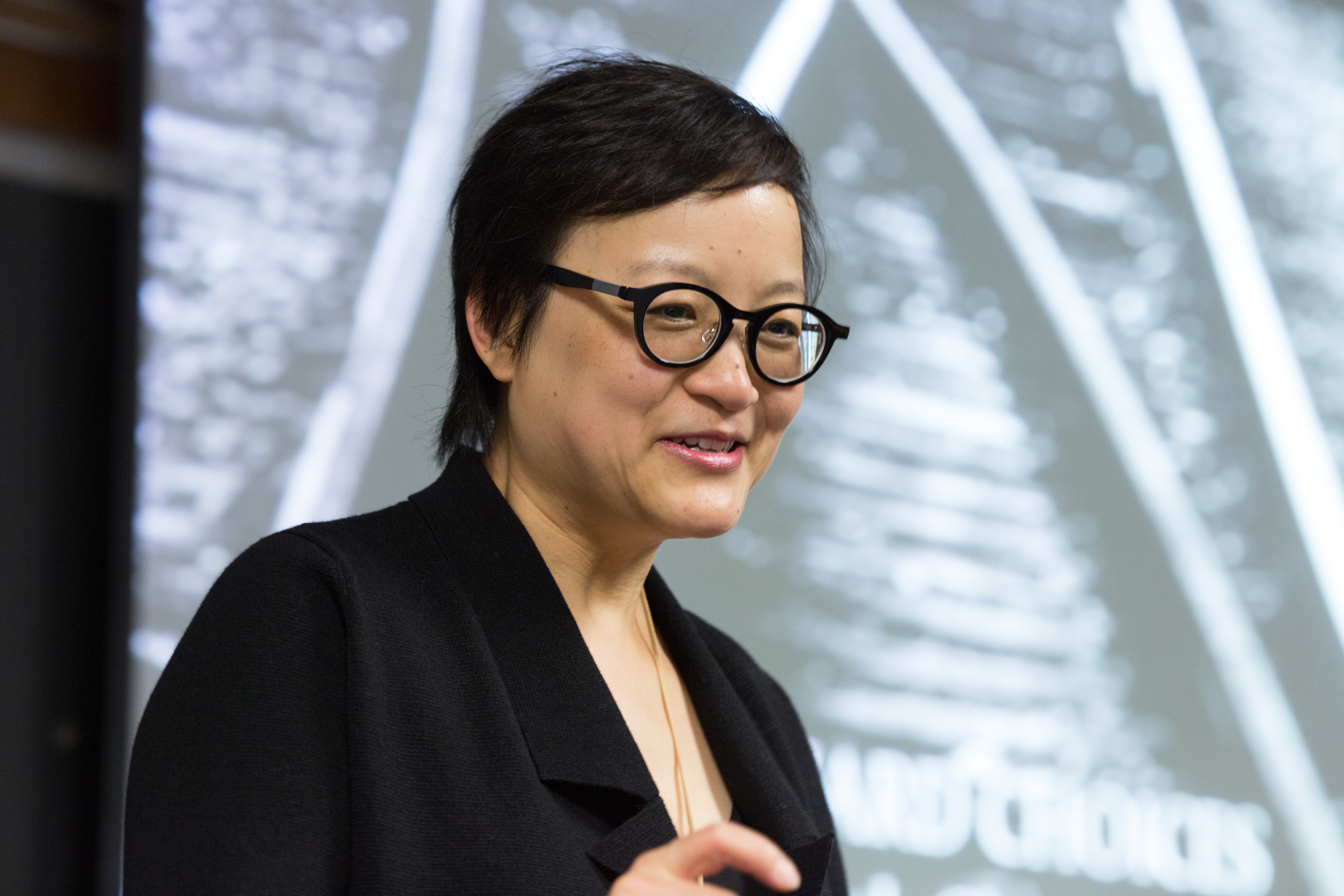
Chang at the Edmond J. Safra Center for Ethics

== Philosophical work ==
Chang's principal research interests lie in normative ethics, metaethics, action theory and moral psychology. Her work focuses on practical conflict, the nature of reasons and values and their relations, and rational agency. She is known for arguing that the normative and evaluative realm, like space and time, is not structured as is commonly assumed. In particular, she is known for arguing that two items which are neither better nor worse than one another and yet not equally good may nevertheless be comparable: they may be 'on a par'. If correct, her view has wide-ranging implications for axiology, normative theory, decision theory, economic choice theory, and rationality. Her work also develops a view of rational agency, 'hybrid voluntarism', according to which rational agents are not merely discoverers of reasons but creators of them through the activity of commitment. She has also written on value pluralism and social choice. She has given various public lectures on decision-making, love, and commitment.

Chang is the author of Making Comparisons Count and the editor of the first volume on the topic of incommensurability of values in the Anglo-American world, Incommensurability, Incomparability, and Practical Reason, and has authored articles and book chapters.

Ruth Chang is also widely known for her work on 'hard choices' and decision-making, and her research has been the subject of radio, newspaper, and magazine articles.

== Selected works ==
- Incommensurability, Incomparability, and Practical Reason, editor (Cambridge, MA: Harvard University Press, 1997) ISBN 978-0674447561
- Making Comparisons Count (New York: Routledge, 2001), Studies in Ethics, series editor, Robert Nozick. ISBN 978-0815337829
- "The Possibility of Parity", Ethics 112 (July 2002), pp. 659–88. doi:10.1086/339673
- "All Things Considered", Philosophical Perspectives 18 (December 2004), pp. 1–22.
- "Parity, Interval Value, and Choice", Ethics 115 (January 2005), pp. 331–50. doi:10.1086/426307
- "Voluntarist Reasons and the Sources of Normativity", in Sobel and Wall, eds., Reasons for Action (New York: Cambridge University Press, 2009), pp. 243–71.
- "Commitments, Reasons, and the Will", in Shafer-Landau, ed., Oxford Studies in Metaethics, vol. 8 (2013), pp. 74–113.
- "Grounding Practical Normativity: Going Hybrid", Philosophical Studies 164 (2013), pp. 163–87. doi:10.1007/s11098-013-0092-z
- "Transformative Choices", Res Philosophica 92 (2015), pp. 237–82. doi:10.11612/resphil.2015.92.2.14
- "Hard Choices", Journal of the American Philosophical Association 3 (2017), pp. 1–21. doi:10.1017/apa.2017.7
- "Do We Have Normative Powers?", Aristotelian Society Supplementary Volume 94 (2020), pp. 275–300. doi:10.1093/arisup/akaa012
- The Routledge Handbook of Practical Reason, co-editor with Kurt Sylvan (London: Routledge, 2021). doi:10.4324/9780429266768
- "How to Avoid the Repugnant Conclusion", in McMahan et al., eds., Ethics and Existence: The Legacy of Derek Parfit (Oxford: Oxford University Press, 2022), pp. 389–429. doi:10.1093/oso/9780192894250.003.0015
- "Three Dogmas of Normativity", Journal of Applied Philosophy 40 (2023), pp. 173–204. doi:10.1111/japp.12626
- Conversations in Philosophy, Law, and Politics, co-editor with Amia Srinivasan (Oxford: Oxford University Press, 2024). ISBN 978-0198864523
- Research Handbook on Legal Argumentation, co-editor with Luís Duarte d'Almeida, Lilian Bermejo-Luque, Euan MacDonald, and Fabio Shecaira (Cheltenham: Edward Elgar, 2025). doi:10.4337/9781803925431
