= Tamar Gendler =

American philosopher (born 1965)

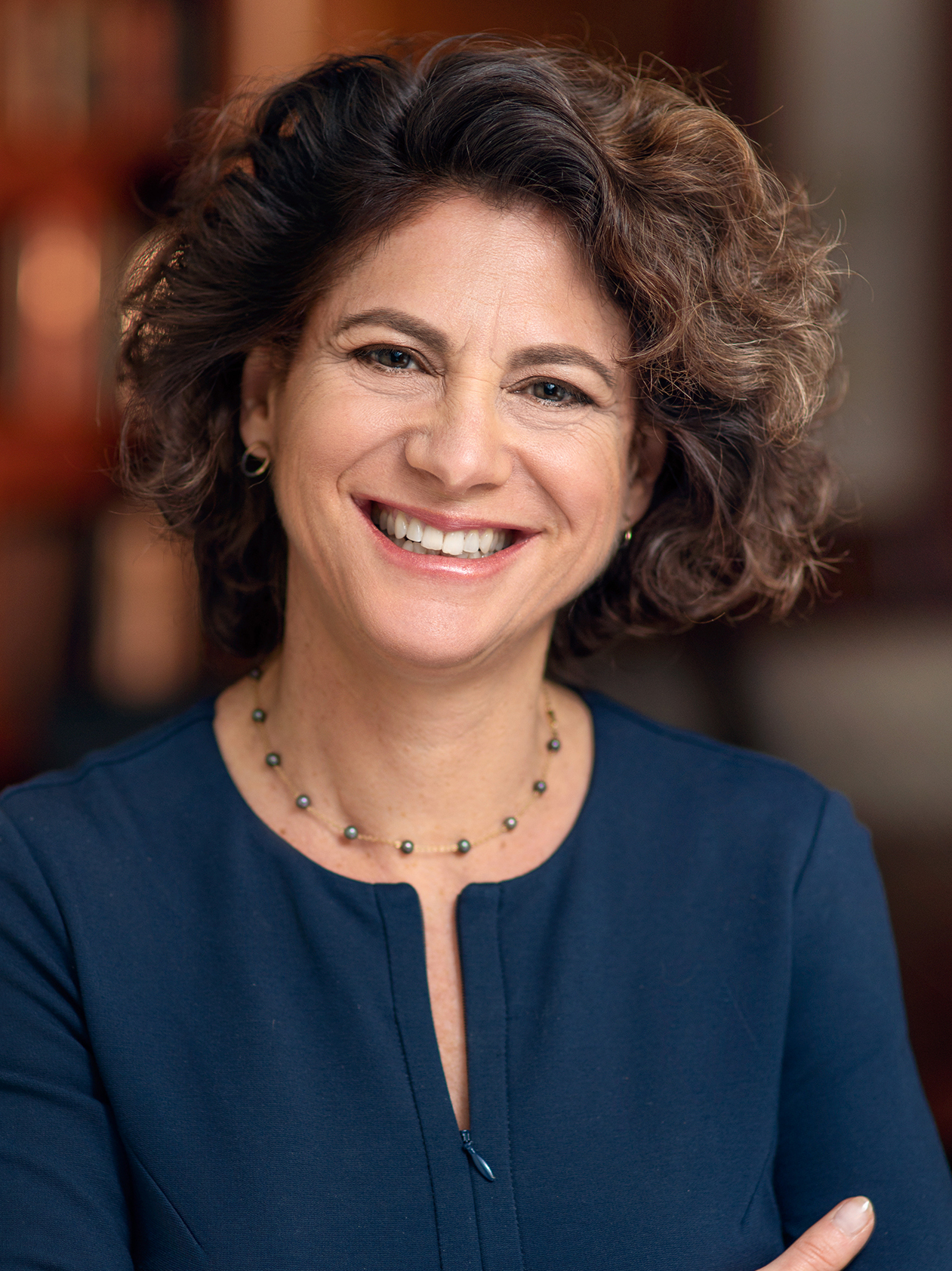
- Gendler in 2018
- Born: 1965 (age 60–61)
- Known for: Alief
- Title: Vincent J. Scully Professor of Philosophy, Yale University

Academic background
- Education: Yale University (BA); Harvard University (PhD)
- Website: tamar-gendler.yale.edu

Tamar Szabó Gendler (born 1965) is an American philosopher and academic. She is a professor of philosophy, psychology, and cognitive science at Yale University, where she also served as inaugural dean of the Faculty of Arts and Sciences from 2014 to 2024. Her academic research focuses on issues in the philosophy of psychology, epistemology, metaphysics, aesthetics, and moral psychology.

Gendler is best known for her work on thought experiments and imagination—particularly on the phenomenon of imaginative resistance—and for coining the term alief.

== Early life and education ==
Tamar Gendler was born in December 1965, to rabbi Everett Gendler and his wife Mary. At the time, Everett Gendler was a rabbi at the Jewish Center of Princeton, New Jersey. Tamar Gendler attended Phillips Academy in Andover, Massachusetts, and graduated in 1983.

As an undergraduate, Gendler studied at Yale University, where she was a member of the Yale Debate Association. She graduated in 1987 with majors in the Humanities and Mathematics & Philosophy programs.

From 1987 to 1988, she worked for the Council for Basic Education as a research assistant. From 1988 to 1989, she was an education policy analyst for Linda Darling-Hammond and others at the RAND Corporation.

She was a Ph.D. candidate at the University of California, Berkeley, from 1989 to 1990, before transferring to Harvard University, where she was advised by Robert Nozick, Derek Parfit, and Hilary Putnam and received her Ph.D. in philosophy in 1996.

== Career ==
Gendler was a lecturer at Yale University from 1996 to 1997, and taught philosophy at Syracuse University from 1997 to 2003 and at Cornell University from 2003 to 2006 before rejoining Yale in 2006 as a professor of philosophy and cognitive science.

In 2013, she was appointed the deputy provost for the humanities and initiatives. From July 2014 through December 2024, Gendler served as the dean of the Yale Faculty of Arts and Sciences. She was the inaugural holder of the deanship, and served two five-year terms. In her role she managed the budget of the faculty, recruited faculty, and worked to combine her duties in budgeting and academic affairs. Under her leadership, divisional deans were established within the arts and sciences and the division's faculty senate was established. She was a contender in the presidential search at Yale following the end of Peter Salovey's term in 2024, but was not selected. Gendler returned full-time to teaching and scholarship after her deanship; Steven Wilkinson succeeded her in the position in January 2025. As of 2026, Gendler is a faculty member in the departments of philosophy and psychology and in the cognitive studies program, with her research interests including the philosophy of psychology, epistemology, metaphysics, aesthetics, and moral psychology.

She is the author of Thought Experiments: On the Powers and Limits of Imaginary Cases (Routledge, 2000) and Intuition, Imagination and Philosophical Methodology (Oxford, 2010), and editor or co-editor of The Elements of Philosophy (Oxford 2008), Perceptual Experience (Oxford, 2006), Conceivability and Possibility (Oxford 2002). She is also co-editor of the journal Oxford Studies in Epistemology and The Oxford Handbook of Philosophical Methodology.

== Awards and honors ==
Gendler received a graduate fellowship from the Andrew W. Mellon Foundation in 1989 and a National Science Foundation graduate fellowship in 1991. The American Council of Learned Societies named her a Ryskamp Fellow for 2003 to 2004. For the 2009–2010 academic year, Gendler used funds from a Mellon Foundation fellowship to return to school and take courses at Yale in neuroscience, statistics, and psychology.

In 2012, she was named Vincent J. Scully Professor of Philosophy, a chair endowed in the name of Vincent J. Scully. In 2013, she was awarded the Yale College-Sidonie Miskimin Clauss '75 Prize for Excellence in Teaching in the Humanities, the "highest Humanities teaching prize at Yale University".

Her philosophical articles have appeared in journals such as the Journal of Philosophy, Mind, Philosophical Perspectives, Mind & Language, Midwest Studies in Philosophy, Philosophical Studies, and The Philosophical Quarterly. Her 2008 essay "Alief and Belief" was selected by the Philosopher's Annual as one of the 10 best articles published in philosophy in 2008.

== Personal life ==
Gendler is married to Zoltan Gendler Szabo, a philosopher and linguist who is also a professor at Yale.

Gendler has two children that are Laszlo Szabó Gendler and Hannah Gendler Szabó. https://www.nytimes.com/1995/06/18/style/weddings-tamar-gendler-zoltan-szabo.html

== Bibliography ==
- The Oxford Handbook of Philosophical Methodology. Co-edited by Tamar Szabo Gendler, Herman Cappelen, and John Hawthorne. NY/Oxford: Clarendon/Oxford University Press, 2016.
- Intuition, Imagination and Philosophical Methodology: Selected Papers. NY/Oxford: Clarendon/Oxford University Press, 2010.
- The Elements of Philosophy: Readings from Past and Present. Co-edited with Susanna Siegel and Steven M. Cahn, NY: Oxford, 2008.
- Perceptual Experience. Co-edited with an introduction by Tamar Szabó Gendler and John Hawthorne. NY/Oxford: Clarendon/Oxford University Press, 2006.
- Conceivability and Possibility. Co-edited with an introduction by Tamar Szabó Gendler and John Hawthorne. NY/Oxford: Clarendon/Oxford University Press, 2002.
- Thought Experiment: On the Powers and Limits of Imaginary Cases. NY: Routledge, 2000.
- Intuition, imagination, and philosophical methodology. Oxford University Press, 2010.
