= Milette =

Milette is a given name. Notable people with the name include:

- Milette Gaifman, Israeli historian and classicist
- Milette Shamir, Israeli academic administrator and scholar of American literature

== See also ==
- Sarah Milette (born 1997), Canadian trampoline gymnast
