= Yale Faculty of Arts and Sciences =

Faculty of Yale University

The Faculty of Arts and Sciences (FAS) is a division of Yale University. It is organized into three divisions: humanities, social science, and science; the School of Engineering and Applied Science (SEAS) was a division of the Faculty of Arts and Sciences until it became its own unit of the university in 2022. FAS and SEAS faculty are represented by the FAS-SEAS Senate, an elected 25-member senate who liaise between the faculty and university administration.

The FAS consists of over 1,000 faculty members, who provide instruction to students in Yale College and the Graduate School of Arts and Sciences through more than 40 departments and programs. The president of Yale described the relationship between these units as follows: "Faculty recruitment, appointment, tenure, and promotion will be handled primarily by the dean of FAS. The dean of Yale College will have a key role in leading the expansion of Yale College and the formation of two new residential colleges. The dean of the Graduate School will continue to advance graduate student preparation for scholarly and other professions, as well as focus on the campus experience for graduate students."

The first dean of the Faculty of Arts and Sciences was appointed in 2014, inheriting certain responsibilities of the Yale University provost and the deans of Yale College and the Graduate School. Tamar Gendler served as the inaugural FAS dean from 2014 to 2024. Since 2025, Steven Wilkinson has held the deanship; three divisional deans represent the divisions.

== Organization ==
Faculty	Division	Department or program
Arts and Sciences (Dean: Steven Wilkinson)	Division of Humanities (Dean: Marc Robinson)	American Studies (Program chair: Laura Barraclough) (Note: Cross-divisional program in the divisions of humanities and social science)
Arts and Sciences (Dean: Steven Wilkinson)	Division of Humanities (Dean: Marc Robinson)	Black Studies (Department chair: Erica Edwards) (Note: Cross-divisional department in the divisions of humanities and social science)
Arts and Sciences (Dean: Steven Wilkinson)	Division of Humanities (Dean: Marc Robinson)	Classics (Department chair: Noel Lenski)
Arts and Sciences (Dean: Steven Wilkinson)	Division of Humanities (Dean: Marc Robinson)	Cognitive Science (Program chair: Joshua Knobe)
Arts and Sciences (Dean: Steven Wilkinson)	Division of Humanities (Dean: Marc Robinson)	Comparative Literature (Department chair: Jing Tsu)
Arts and Sciences (Dean: Steven Wilkinson)	Division of Humanities (Dean: Marc Robinson)	Early Modern Studies (Program chair: Marisa Bass)
Arts and Sciences (Dean: Steven Wilkinson)	Division of Humanities (Dean: Marc Robinson)	East Asian Languages and Literatures (Department chair: Tina Lu)
Arts and Sciences (Dean: Steven Wilkinson)	Division of Humanities (Dean: Marc Robinson)	English (Department chair: Caleb Smith)
Arts and Sciences (Dean: Steven Wilkinson)	Division of Humanities (Dean: Marc Robinson)	Ethnicity, Race, and Migration (Program chair: Fatima El-Tayeb)
Arts and Sciences (Dean: Steven Wilkinson)	Division of Humanities (Dean: Marc Robinson)	Film and Media Studies (Program chair: Fatima Naqvi)
Arts and Sciences (Dean: Steven Wilkinson)	Division of Humanities (Dean: Marc Robinson)	French (Department chair: Maurice Samuels)
Arts and Sciences (Dean: Steven Wilkinson)	Division of Humanities (Dean: Marc Robinson)	Germanic Languages and Literatures (Department chair: Kirk Wetters)
Arts and Sciences (Dean: Steven Wilkinson)	Division of Humanities (Dean: Marc Robinson)	History (Department chair: Regina Kunzel)
Arts and Sciences (Dean: Steven Wilkinson)	Division of Humanities (Dean: Marc Robinson)	History of Art (Department chair: Milette Gaifman)
Arts and Sciences (Dean: Steven Wilkinson)	Division of Humanities (Dean: Marc Robinson)	History of Science and Medicine (Program chair: Bill Rankin)
Arts and Sciences (Dean: Steven Wilkinson)	Division of Humanities (Dean: Marc Robinson)	Humanities (Program chair: Pauline LeVen)
Arts and Sciences (Dean: Steven Wilkinson)	Division of Humanities (Dean: Marc Robinson)	Italian Studies (Department chair: Jane Tylus)
Arts and Sciences (Dean: Steven Wilkinson)	Division of Humanities (Dean: Marc Robinson)	Jewish Studies (Program chair: Eliyahu Stern)
Arts and Sciences (Dean: Steven Wilkinson)	Division of Humanities (Dean: Marc Robinson)	Medieval Studies (Program chair: Emily Thornbury)
Arts and Sciences (Dean: Steven Wilkinson)	Division of Humanities (Dean: Marc Robinson)	Music (Department chair: Gundala Kreuzer)
Arts and Sciences (Dean: Steven Wilkinson)	Division of Humanities (Dean: Marc Robinson)	Near Eastern Languages and Civilizations (Department chair: Nadine Moeller)
Arts and Sciences (Dean: Steven Wilkinson)	Division of Humanities (Dean: Marc Robinson)	Philosophy (Department chair: Paul Franks)
Arts and Sciences (Dean: Steven Wilkinson)	Division of Humanities (Dean: Marc Robinson)	Religious Studies (Department chair: Travis Zadeh)
Arts and Sciences (Dean: Steven Wilkinson)	Division of Humanities (Dean: Marc Robinson)	Slavic Languages and Literatures (Department chair: Edyta Bojanowska)
Arts and Sciences (Dean: Steven Wilkinson)	Division of Humanities (Dean: Marc Robinson)	Spanish and Portuguese (Department chair: R. Howard Bloch)
Arts and Sciences (Dean: Steven Wilkinson)	Division of Humanities (Dean: Marc Robinson)	Theater, Dance, and Performance Studies (Program chair: Shane Vogel)
Arts and Sciences (Dean: Steven Wilkinson)	Division of Humanities (Dean: Marc Robinson)	Women's, Gender, and Sexuality Studies (Program chair: Roderick Ferguson)
Arts and Sciences (Dean: Steven Wilkinson)	Division of Social Science (Dean: Alan Gerber)	American Studies (Program chair: Laura Barraclough)
Arts and Sciences (Dean: Steven Wilkinson)	Division of Social Science (Dean: Alan Gerber)	Anthropology (Department chair: Douglas Rogers)
Arts and Sciences (Dean: Steven Wilkinson)	Division of Social Science (Dean: Alan Gerber)	Black Studies (Department chair: Erica Edwards)
Arts and Sciences (Dean: Steven Wilkinson)	Division of Social Science (Dean: Alan Gerber)	Cognitive Science (Program chair: Joshua Knobe)
Arts and Sciences (Dean: Steven Wilkinson)	Division of Social Science (Dean: Alan Gerber)	Economics (Department chair: Samuel Kortum)
Arts and Sciences (Dean: Steven Wilkinson)	Division of Social Science (Dean: Alan Gerber)	Ethnicity, Race, and Migration (Program chair: Fatima el-Tayeb)
Arts and Sciences (Dean: Steven Wilkinson)	Division of Social Science (Dean: Alan Gerber)	Linguistics (Department chair: Veneeta Dayal)
Arts and Sciences (Dean: Steven Wilkinson)	Division of Social Science (Dean: Alan Gerber)	Political Science (Department chair: Gerard Padró i Miquel)
Arts and Sciences (Dean: Steven Wilkinson)	Division of Social Science (Dean: Alan Gerber)	Psychology (Department chair: Jutta Joormann)
Arts and Sciences (Dean: Steven Wilkinson)	Division of Social Science (Dean: Alan Gerber)	Sociology (Department chair: Emily Erikson)
Arts and Sciences (Dean: Steven Wilkinson)	Division of Social Science (Dean: Alan Gerber)	Statistics and Data Science (Department chair: Yihong Wu)
Arts and Sciences (Dean: Steven Wilkinson)	Division of Social Science (Dean: Alan Gerber)	Women's, Gender, and Sexuality Studies (Program chair: Roderick Ferguson)
Arts and Sciences (Dean: Steven Wilkinson)	Division of Science (Dean: Larry Gladney)	Astronomy (Department chair: Priyamvada Natarajan)
Arts and Sciences (Dean: Steven Wilkinson)	Division of Science (Dean: Larry Gladney)	Chemistry (Department chair: Nilay Hizari)
Arts and Sciences (Dean: Steven Wilkinson)	Division of Science (Dean: Larry Gladney)	Earth and Planetary Sciences (Department chair: Nilay Hazari)
Arts and Sciences (Dean: Steven Wilkinson)	Division of Science (Dean: Larry Gladney)	Ecology and Evolutionary Biology (Department chair: David Vasseur)
Arts and Sciences (Dean: Steven Wilkinson)	Division of Science (Dean: Larry Gladney)	Mathematics (Department chair: Wilhelm Schlag)
Arts and Sciences (Dean: Steven Wilkinson)	Division of Science (Dean: Larry Gladney)	Molecular Biophysics and Biochemistry (Department chair: Ronald Breaker)
Arts and Sciences (Dean: Steven Wilkinson)	Division of Science (Dean: Larry Gladney)	Molecular, Cellular, and Developmental Biology (Department chair: Scott Holley)
Arts and Sciences (Dean: Steven Wilkinson)	Division of Science (Dean: Larry Gladney)	Physics (Department chair: Sarah Demers)
