= Description (disambiguation) =

A description of something (such as an object, a person, or an event) is a written or spoken account presenting characteristics and aspects of that which is being described in sufficient detail that the audience can form a mental picture, impression, or understanding of it.

Description may also refer to:

- Audio description, the translation of audiovisual media into narration for blind, partially sighted and visually impaired viewers
- Definite description, a phrase that denotes an object, discussed in the philosophy of language
- Description (linguistics), analyzing and describing how language is spoken by a group of people in a speech community
- Mathematical model, a description in mathematical language of a system
- Scientific theory, a description of an aspect of the natural world
- Species description, a formal description of a newly defined species in biological taxonomy
