= Ofra Magidor =

Oxford philosopher and logician

- Born: 1976 (age 49–50)

Education
- Education: Hebrew University of Jerusalem; Balliol College, Oxford
- Doctoral advisor: Timothy Williamson

Philosophical work
- Institutions: The Queen's College, Oxford; Balliol College, Oxford; Magdalen College, Oxford
- Main interests: Metaphysics, philosophy of language, epistemology, philosophy of mathematics

Ofra Magidor (Hebrew: עפרה מגידור; born 1976) is a philosopher and logician, and current Waynflete Professor of Metaphysical Philosophy at University of Oxford and Fellow of Magdalen College.

== Biography ==
Magidor received her BSc in mathematics, philosophy, and computer science from the Hebrew University of Jerusalem in 2002, and a BPhil in philosophy from Balliol College, Oxford in 2004. In 2007 she completed her DPhil, also from Balliol College. She has lectured at Oxford since 2005, as a junior research fellow at the Queen's College and later tutorial fellow at Balliol College, and in 2016 she became the Waynflete Professor of Metaphysical Philosophy, the second woman to hold this position. In 2014, she was the recipient of the Philip Leverhulme Prize, in recognition of her outstanding research achievements.

Currently, Magidor is on the editorial boards of the journals Disputatio, Ergo, Thought, and Mind.

Her father is the mathematician Menachem Magidor.

== Published works ==
- 2013. Category Mistakes, Oxford University Press.
- 2025. Property Versatility and Copredication (with David Liebesman), Oxford University Press.

== See also ==
- Category mistake

Academic offices
| Preceded by John Hawthorne | Waynflete Professor of Metaphysical Philosophy at Oxford University; 2016- | Succeeded by |
