= London Mathematical Society =

Learned society for mathematics in the United Kingdom

Coordinates: 51.5212°N 0.1243°W

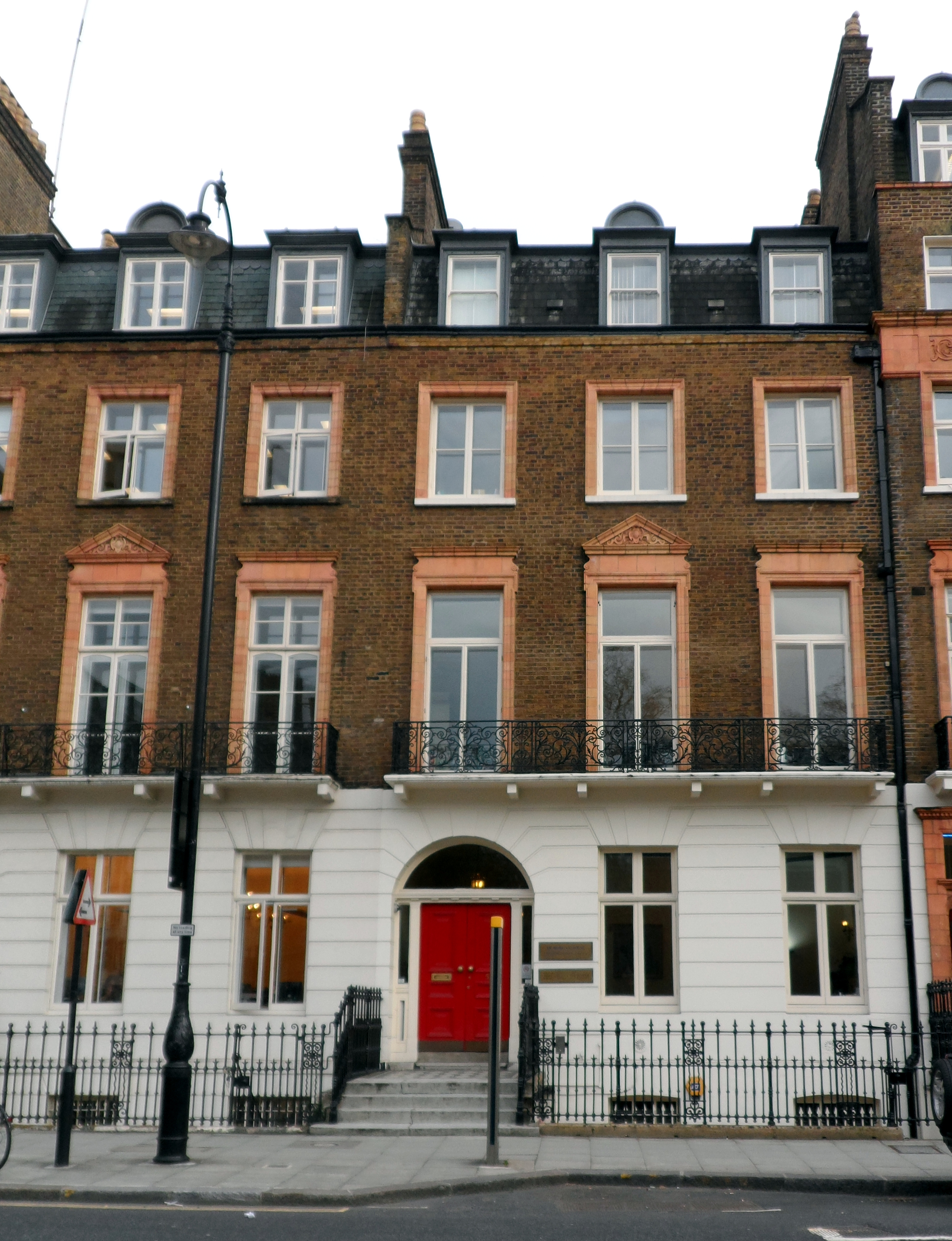
- De Morgan House
- Formation: 1865
- Type: Learned society
- Headquarters: London, WC1; United Kingdom
- President: Jens Marklof
- Key people: Catherine Hobbs; Iain Gordon (Vice President)
- Website: lms.ac.uk

The London Mathematical Society (LMS) is one of the United Kingdom's learned societies for mathematics, the others being the Royal Statistical Society (RSS), the Institute of Mathematics and its Applications (IMA), the Edinburgh Mathematical Society and the Operational Research Society (ORS).

== History ==
The Society was established on 16 January 1865, the first president being Augustus De Morgan. The earliest meetings were held in University College, but the Society soon moved into Burlington House, Piccadilly. The initial activities of the Society included talks and publication of a journal.

The LMS was used as a model for the establishment of the American Mathematical Society in 1888.

Mary Cartwright was the first woman to be President of the LMS (in 1961–62).

The Society was granted a royal charter in 1965, a century after its foundation. In 1998 the Society moved from rooms in Burlington House into De Morgan House (named after the society's first president), at 57–58 Russell Square, Bloomsbury, to accommodate an expansion of its staff.

In 2015 the Society celebrated its 150th anniversary. During the year the anniversary was celebrated with a wide range of meetings, events, and other activities, highlighting the historical and continuing value and prevalence of mathematics in society, and in everyday life.

== Membership ==
Membership is open to those who are interested in mathematics. Currently, there are four classes of membership, namely: (a) Ordinary, (b) Reciprocity, (c) Associate, and (d) Associate (undergraduate). In addition, Honorary Members of the Society are distinguished mathematicians who are not normally resident in the UK, who are proposed by the Society's Council for election to Membership at a Society Meeting.

== LMS Activities ==
The Society publishes books and periodicals; organises mathematical conferences; provides funding to promote mathematics research and education; and awards a number of prizes and fellowships for excellence in mathematical research.

=== Grants ===
The Society supports mathematics in the UK through its grant schemes. These schemes provide support for mathematicians at different stages in their careers. The Society's grants include research grants for mathematicians, early career researchers and computer scientists working at the interface of mathematics and computer science; education grants for teachers and other educators; travel grants to attend conferences; and grants for those with caring responsibilities.

Awarding grants is one of the primary mechanisms through which the Society achieves its central purpose, namely to 'promote and extend mathematical knowledge'.

=== Fellowships ===
The Society also offers a range of Fellowships: LMS Early Career Fellowships; LMS Atiyah-Lebanon UK Fellowships; LMS Emmy Noether Fellowships and Grace Chisholm Young Fellowships.

=== Society lectures and meetings ===
The Society organises an annual programme of events and meetings. The programme provides meetings of interest to undergraduates, through early career researchers to established mathematicians. These include LMS-Bath Mathematical Symposia, Lecture Series (Aitken/Forder, Hardy, Invited), Research Schools, LMS Prospects in Mathematics Meeting, Public Lectures, Society Meetings, LMS Undergraduate Summer Schools and Women in Mathematics Days.

== Publications ==
The Society's periodical publications include five journals:

- Bulletin of the London Mathematical Society (1969–present)
- Journal of the London Mathematical Society (1926–present)
- Proceedings of the London Mathematical Society (1865–present)
- Transactions of the London Mathematical Society (2014–present)
- Journal of Topology (2006 – present)

It also publishes the journal Compositio Mathematica on behalf of its owning foundation, Mathematika on behalf of University College London and Nonlinearity with the Institute of Physics.

=== Books ===
The Society publishes two book series, the LMS Lecture Notes and LMS Student Texts.

Previously it published a series of Monographs and (jointly with the American Mathematical Society) the History of Mathematics series.

An electronic journal, the LMS Journal of Computation and Mathematics, ceased publication at the end of 2017.

== Prizes ==
The named prizes are:

- De Morgan Medal (triennial) — the most prestigious
- Pólya Prize (two years out of three)
- Fröhlich Prize (biennial)
- Shephard Prize (biennial)
- Senior Whitehead Prize (biennial)
- Naylor Prize and Lectureship (biennial)
- Senior Berwick Prize
- Berwick Prize
- Senior Anne Bennett Prize
- Anne Bennett Prize
- Whitehead Prize
- Louis Bachelier Prize (biennial)
- Hirst Prize

In addition, the Society jointly with the Institute of Mathematics and its Applications awards the David Crighton Medal and Christopher Zeeman Medal on alternating years. The LMS also awards the Emmy Noether Fellowships.

== List of presidents ==
- 1865–1866 Augustus De Morgan
- 1866–1868 James Joseph Sylvester
- 1868–1870 Arthur Cayley
- 1870–1872 William Spottiswoode
- 1872–1874 Thomas Archer Hirst
- 1874–1876 Henry John Stephen Smith
- 1876–1878 Lord Rayleigh
- 1878–1880 Charles Watkins Merrifield
- 1880–1882 Samuel Roberts
- 1882–1884 Olaus Henrici
- 1884–1886 James Whitbread Lee Glaisher
- 1886–1888 James Cockle
- 1888–1890 John James Walker
- 1890–1892 Alfred George Greenhill
- 1892–1894 Alfred Kempe
- 1894–1896 Percy Alexander MacMahon
- 1896–1898 Edwin Elliott
- 1898–1900 William Thomson, 1st Baron Kelvin
- 1900–1902 E. W. Hobson
- 1902–1904 Horace Lamb
- 1904–1906 Andrew Forsyth
- 1906–1908 William Burnside
- 1908–1910 William Davidson Niven
- 1910–1912 H. F. Baker
- 1912–1914 Augustus Edward Hough Love
- 1914–1916 Joseph Larmor
- 1916–1918 Hector Macdonald
- 1918–1920 John Edward Campbell
- 1920–1922 Herbert Richmond
- 1922–1924 William Henry Young
- 1924–1926 Arthur Lee Dixon
- 1926–1928 G. H. Hardy
- 1928–1929 E. T. Whittaker
- 1929–1931 Sydney Chapman
- 1931–1933 Alfred Cardew Dixon
- 1933–1935 G. N. Watson
- 1935–1937 George Barker Jeffery
- 1937–1939 Edward Arthur Milne
- 1939–1941 G. H. Hardy
- 1941–1943 John Edensor Littlewood
- 1943–1945 L. J. Mordell
- 1945–1947 Edward Charles Titchmarsh
- 1947–1949 W. V. D. Hodge
- 1949–1951 Max Newman
- 1951–1953 George Frederick James Temple
- 1953–1955 J. H. C. Whitehead
- 1955–1957 Philip Hall
- 1957–1959 Harold Davenport
- 1959–1961 Hans Heilbronn
- 1961–1963 Mary Cartwright
- 1963–1965 Arthur Geoffrey Walker
- 1965–1967 Graham Higman
- 1967–1969 J. A. Todd
- 1969–1970 Edward Collingwood
- 1970–1972 Claude Ambrose Rogers
- 1972–1974 David George Kendall
- 1974–1976 Michael Atiyah
- 1976–1978 J. W. S. Cassels
- 1978–1980 C. T. C. Wall
- 1980–1982 Barry Johnson
- 1982–1984 Paul Cohn
- 1984–1986 Ioan James
- 1986–1988 Erik Christopher Zeeman
- 1988–1990 John H. Coates
- 1990–1992 John Kingman
- 1992–1994 John Ringrose
- 1994–1996 Nigel Hitchin
- 1996–1998 John M. Ball
- 1998–2000 Martin J. Taylor
- 2000–2002 Trevor Stuart
- 2002–2003 Peter Goddard
- 2003–2005 Frances Kirwan
- 2005–2007 John Toland
- 2007–2009 E. Brian Davies
- 2009 (interim) John M. Ball
- 2009–2011 Angus Macintyre
- 2011–2013 Graeme Segal
- 2013–2015 Terry Lyons
- 2015–2017 Simon Tavaré
- 2017–2019 Caroline Series
- 2019–2021 Jonathan Keating
- 2022–2024 Ulrike Tillman
- 2025–2027 Mark Chaplain

== Collections ==
The Society's archive (up until 1994) is held in University College London (UCL) Special Collections. The collection primarily contains letters to Thomas Archer Hirst, but also includes correspondence to other European mathematicians. UCL holds around 150 rare books from the Society which focus on the history of mathematics and were published between 1701 - 1850.

== See also ==
- Edinburgh Mathematical Society
- List of Mathematical Societies
- Council for the Mathematical Sciences
- BCS-FACS Specialist Group
