= Sorites paradox =

Logical paradox from vague predicates

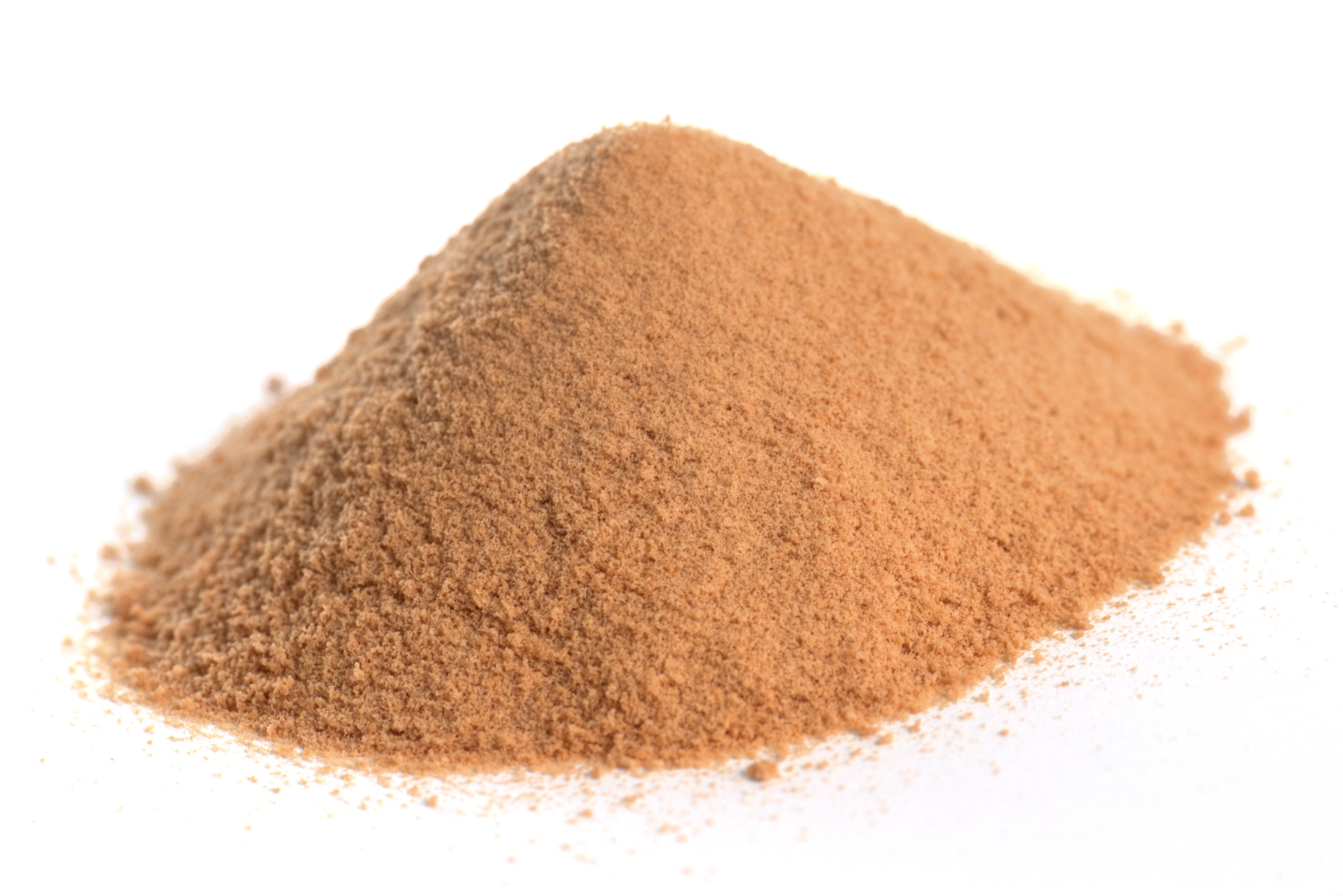
The sorites paradox: If a heap is reduced by a single grain at a time, at what exact point does it cease to be considered a heap?

The Sorites paradox (/soʊˈraɪtiːz/), sometimes known as the paradox of the heap, is a paradox that results from vague predicates. A typical formulation involves a heap of sand, from which grains are removed individually. With the assumption that removing a single grain does not cause a heap not to be considered a heap anymore, the paradox is to consider what happens when the process is repeated enough times that only one grain remains and if it is still a heap. If not, then the question asks when it changed from a heap to a non-heap.

== Original formulation ==
The word sorites (Ancient Greek: σωρείτης) derives from the Greek word for heap (Ancient Greek: σωρός). The paradox is named because of its original characterization, attributed to Eubulides of Miletus. The paradox is as follows: consider a heap of sand from which grains are removed individually. One might construct the argument from the following premises:

1,000,000 grains of sand is a heap of sand (Premise 1)
A heap of sand minus one grain is still a heap. (Premise 2)

Repeated applications of premise 2 (each time starting with one fewer grain) eventually forces one to accept the conclusion that a heap may be composed of just one grain of sand. Read (1995) observes that "the argument is itself a heap, or sorites, of steps of modus ponens":

1,000,000 grains is a heap.
If 1,000,000 grains is a heap then 999,999 grains is a heap.
So 999,999 grains is a heap.
If 999,999 grains is a heap then 999,998 grains is a heap.
So 999,998 grains is a heap.
If ...
... So 1 grain is a heap.

One grain of sand is not considered to be a heap of sand. So the argument, although seeming valid and with plausible premises, has a false conclusion, which makes it a paradox, according to a popular (though not universally accepted) academic definition of "paradox".

== Variations ==
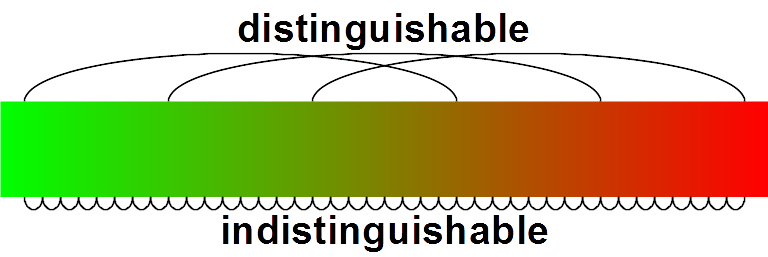
Color gradient illustrating a sorites paradox, any adjacent colors being indistinguishable by the human eye

There are many variations of the sorites paradox, some of which allow consideration of the difference between "being" and "seeming", that is, between a question of fact and a question of perception; this may be seen to be relevant when the argument hinges on each change being "imperceptible".

Another formulation is to start with a grain of sand, which is clearly not a heap, and then assume that adding a single grain of sand to something that is not a heap does not cause it to become a heap. Inductively, this process can be repeated as much as one wants without ever constructing a heap. A more natural formulation of this variant is to assume a set of colored chips exists such that two adjacent chips vary in color too little for human eyesight to be able to distinguish between them. Then by induction on this premise, humans would not be able to distinguish between any colors.

The removal of one drop from the ocean, will not make it "not an ocean" (it is still an ocean), but since the volume of water in the ocean is finite, eventually, after enough removals, even a litre of water left is still an ocean.

This paradox can be reconstructed for a variety of predicates, for example, with "tall", "rich", "old", "blue", "bald", and so on. The version about baldness, where it is argued that adding a single hair does not make a bald man no longer bald, is known as the "falakros", from the Greek for "bald" (φαλακρός). Bertrand Russell argued that all of natural language, even logical connectives, is vague; moreover, representations of propositions are vague.

== General conditional sorites ==
A formal generalization of the paradoxical sorites argument is as follows:

$Fa_{1}$.
If $Fa_{1}$, then $Fa_{2}$.
If $Fa_{2}$, then $Fa_{3}$.
$\vdots$
If $Fa_{n-1}$, then $Fa_{n}$.
$\overline{\therefore Fa_{n}}$ (where $n$ can be arbitrarily large)

This formalization is in first-order logic, where $F$ is a predicate and $a_{1}, a_{2}, a_{3}, \ldots, a_{n}$ are different subjects to which it may be applied; for each subject $a_{i}$, the notation $Fa_{i}$ signifies the application of the predicate $F$ to $a_{i}$, i.e., the proposition that "$a_{i}$ is $F$". (Jonathan Barnes originally represented each "if $Fa_{n}$, then $Fa_{n+1}$" proposition using the symbol $\supset$ for the material implication connective, so his argument originally ended with $Fa_{n-1} \supset Fa_{n}$.)

Jonathan Barnes has discovered the conditions for an argument of this general form to be soritical. First, the series $\langle a_{1}, . . . , a_{n} \rangle$ must be ordered; for example, heaps may be ordered according to number of grains of sand in them, or, in the falakros version (see § Variations), heads may be ordered according to the number of hairs on them. Second, the predicate $F$ must be soritical relative to the series $\langle a_{1}, . . . , a_{n} \rangle$, which means: first, that it is, to all appearances, true of $a_{1}$, the first item in the series; second, that it is, to all appearances, false of $a_{n}$, the last item in the series; and third, that all adjacent pairs of subjects in the series, $a_{i}$ and $a_{i+1}$, are, to all appearances, so similar as to be indiscriminable in respect of $F$ – that is, it must seem that either both of $a_{i}$ and $a_{i+1}$ satisfy $F$, or neither do.

This last condition on the predicate is what Crispin Wright called the predicate's tolerance of small degrees of change, and which he considered a condition of a predicate's being vague. As Wright said, supposing that $\phi$ is a concept related to a predicate $F$ such that "any object which $F$ characterizes may be changed into one which it does not simply by sufficient change in respect of $\phi$", then "$F$ is tolerant with respect to $\phi$ if there is also some positive degree of change in respect of $\phi$ insufficient ever to affect the justice with which $F$ applies to a particular case."

== Proposed resolutions ==
=== Denying the existence of heaps ===
One may object to the first premise by denying that 1,000,000 grains of sand make a heap. But 1,000,000 is just an arbitrary large number, and the argument will apply with any such number. So the response must deny outright that there are such things as heaps. Peter Unger defends this solution. However, A. J. Ayer repudiated it when presented with it by Unger: "If we regard everything as being composed of atoms, and think of Unger as consisting not of cells but of the atoms which compose the cells, then, as David Wiggins has pointed out to me, a similar argument could be used to prove that Unger, so far from being non-existent, is identical with everything that there is. We have only to substitute for the premise that the subtraction of one atom from Unger's body never makes any difference to his existence the premise that the addition of one atom to it never makes any difference either."

=== Setting a fixed boundary ===
A common first response to the paradox is to term any set of grains that has more than a certain number of grains in it a heap. If one were to define the "fixed boundary" at 10,000 grains then one would claim that for fewer than 10,000, it is not a heap; for 10,000 or more, then it is a heap.

Collins argues that such solutions are unsatisfactory as there seems little significance to the difference between 9,999 grains and 10,000 grains. The boundary, wherever it may be set, remains arbitrary, and so its precision is misleading. It is objectionable on both philosophical and linguistic grounds: the former on account of its arbitrariness and the latter on the ground that it is simply not how natural language is used. Nonetheless, the neurological phenomenon of subitizing suggests a naturally occurring, non-arbitrary minimum value of 4 grains for the boundary: when the number of grains of sand can be subitized, it can no longer be an indefinite quantity ("heap").

=== Unknowable boundaries (or epistemicism) ===
Timothy Williamson and Roy Sorensen claim that there are fixed boundaries but that they are necessarily unknowable.

=== Supervaluationism ===
Supervaluationism is a method for dealing with irreferential singular terms and vagueness. It allows one to retain the usual tautological laws even when dealing with undefined truth values. An example of a proposition about an irreferential singular term is the sentence "Pegasus likes licorice". Since the name "Pegasus" fails to refer, no truth value can be assigned to the sentence; there is nothing in the myth that would justify any such assignment. However, there are some statements about Pegasus which have definite truth values nevertheless, such as "Pegasus likes licorice or Pegasus doesn't like licorice". This sentence is an instance of the tautology "$p \vee \neg p$", i.e. the valid schema "$p$ or not-$p$". According to supervaluationism, it should be true regardless of whether or not its components have a truth value.

By admitting sentences without defined truth values, supervaluationism avoids adjacent cases such that n grains of sand is a heap of sand, but n − 1 grains is not; for example, "1,000 grains of sand is a heap" may be considered a border case having no defined truth value. Nevertheless, supervaluationism is able to handle a sentence like "1,000 grains of sand is a heap or 1,000 grains of sand is not a heap" as a tautology, i.e. to assign it the value true.

==== Mathematical explanation ====
Let $v$ be a classical valuation defined on every atomic sentence of the language $L$, and let $At(x)$ be the number of distinct atomic sentences in $x$. Then for every sentence $x$, at most $2^{At(x)}$ distinct classical valuations can exist. A supervaluation $V$ is a function from sentences to truth values such that, a sentence $x$ is super-true (i.e. $V(x) = \text{True}$) if and only if $v(x) = \text{True}$ for every classical valuation $v$; likewise for super-false. Otherwise, $V(x)$ is undefined—i.e. exactly when there are two classical valuations $v$ and $v'$ such that $v(x)=\text{True}$ and $v'(x) = \text{False}$.

For example, let $L \; p$ be the formal translation of "Pegasus likes licorice". Then there are exactly two classical valuations $v$ and $v'$ on $L \; p$, viz. $v(L \; p) = \text{True}$ and $v'(L \; p) = \text{False}$. So $L \; p$ is neither super-true nor super-false. However, the tautology $L \; p \lor \lnot L \; p$ is evaluated to $\text{True}$ by every classical valuation; it is hence super-true. Similarly, the formalization of the above heap proposition $H \; 1000$ is neither super-true nor super-false, but $H \; 1000 \lor \lnot H \; 1000$ is super-true.

=== Truth gaps, gluts, and multi-valued logics ===
Another method is to use a multi-valued logic. In this context, the problem is with the principle of bivalence: the sand is either a heap or is not a heap, without any shades of gray. Instead of two logical states, heap and not-heap, a three value system can be used, for example heap, indeterminate and not-heap. A response to this proposed solution is that three valued systems do not truly resolve the paradox as there is still a dividing line between heap and indeterminate and also between indeterminate and not-heap. The third truth-value can be understood either as a truth-value gap or as a truth-value glut.

Alternatively, fuzzy logic offers a continuous spectrum of logical states represented in the unit interval of real numbers [0,1]—it is a many-valued logic with infinitely-many truth-values, and thus the sand transitions gradually from "definitely heap" to "definitely not heap", with shades in the intermediate region. Fuzzy hedges are used to divide the continuum into regions corresponding to classes like definitely heap, mostly heap, partly heap, slightly heap, and not heap. Though the problem remains of where these borders occur; e.g. at what number of grains sand starts being definitely a heap.

=== Hysteresis ===
Another method, introduced by Raffman, is to use hysteresis, that is, knowledge of what the collection of sand started as. Equivalent amounts of sand may be termed heaps or not based on how they got there. If a large heap (indisputably described as a heap) is diminished slowly, it preserves its "heap status" to a point, even as the actual amount of sand is reduced to a smaller number of grains. For example, 500 grains is a pile and 1,000 grains is a heap. There will be an overlap for these states. So if one is reducing it from a heap to a pile, it is a heap going down until 750. At that point, one would stop calling it a heap and start calling it a pile. But if one replaces one grain, it would not instantly turn back into a heap. When going up it would remain a pile until 900 grains. The numbers picked are arbitrary; the point is, that the same amount can be either a heap or a pile depending on what it was before the change. A common use of hysteresis would be the thermostat for air conditioning: the AC is set at 77 °F and it then cools the air to just below 77 °F, but does not activate again instantly when the air warms to 77.001 °F—it waits until almost 78 °F, to prevent instant change of state over and over again.

=== Group consensus ===
One can establish the meaning of the word heap by appealing to consensus. Williamson, in his epistemic solution to the paradox, assumes that the meaning of vague terms must be determined by group usage. The consensus method typically claims that a collection of grains is as much a "heap" as the proportion of people in a group who believe it to be so. In other words, the probability that any collection is considered a heap is the expected value of the distribution of the group's opinion.

A group may decide that:

- One grain of sand on its own is not a heap.
- A large collection of grains of sand is a heap.

Between the two extremes, individual members of the group may disagree with each other over whether any particular collection can be labelled a "heap". The collection can then not be definitively claimed to be a "heap" or "not a heap". This can be considered an appeal to descriptive linguistics rather than prescriptive linguistics, as it resolves the issue of definition based on how the population uses natural language. Indeed, if a precise prescriptive definition of "heap" is available then the group consensus will always be unanimous and the paradox does not occur.

=== Resolutions in utility theory ===
"X more or equally red than Y" modelled as quasitransitive relation ≈ : indistinguishable, > : clearly more red
^{Y} _{X}	f10	e20	d30	c40	b50	a60
f10	≈	≈	>	>	>	>
e20	≈	≈	≈	>	>	>
d30		≈	≈	≈	>	>
c40			≈	≈	≈	>
b50				≈	≈	≈
a60					≈	≈

In the economics field of utility theory, the sorites paradox arises when a person's preferences patterns are investigated. As an example by Robert Duncan Luce, it is easy to find a person, say, Peggy, who prefers in her coffee 3 grams (that is, 1 cube) of sugar to 15 grams (5 cubes), however, she will usually be indifferent between 3.00 and 3.03 grams, as well as between 3.03 and 3.06 grams, and so on, as well as finally between 14.97 and 15.00 grams.

Two measures were taken by economists to avoid the sorites paradox in such a setting.

- Comparative, rather than positive, forms of properties are used. The above example deliberately does not make a statement like "Peggy likes a cup of coffee with 3 grams of sugar", or "Peggy does not like a cup of coffee with 15 grams of sugar". Instead, it states "Peggy likes a cup of coffee with 3 grams of sugar more than one with 15 grams of sugar".
- Economists distinguish preference ("Peggy likes ... more than ...") from indifference ("Peggy likes ... as much as ... "), and do not consider the latter relation to be transitive. In the above example, abbreviating "a cup of coffee with x grams of sugar" by "c_{x}", and "Peggy is indifferent between c_{x} and c_{y}" as "c_{x} ≈ c_{y}", the facts c_{3.00} ≈ c_{3.03} and c_{3.03} ≈ c_{3.06} and ... and c_{14.97} ≈ c_{15.00} do not imply c_{3.00} ≈ c_{15.00}.

Several kinds of relations were introduced to describe preference and indifference without running into the sorites paradox. Luce defined semi-orders and investigated their mathematical properties; Amartya Sen performed a similar task for quasitransitive relations. Abbreviating "Peggy likes c_{x} more than c_{y}" as "c_{x} > c_{y}", and abbreviating "c_{x} > c_{y} or c_{x} ≈ c_{y}" by "c_{x} ≥ c_{y}", it is reasonable that the relation ">" is a semi-order while ≥ is quasitransitive. Conversely, from a given semi-order > the indifference relation ≈ can be reconstructed by defining c_{x} ≈ c_{y} if neither c_{x} > c_{y} nor c_{y} > c_{x}. Similarly, from a given quasitransitive relation ≥ the indifference relation ≈ can be reconstructed by defining c_{x} ≈ c_{y} if both c_{x} ≥ c_{y} and c_{y} ≥ c_{x}. These reconstructed ≈ relations are usually not transitive.

The table to the right shows how the above color example can be modelled as a quasi-transitive relation ≥. Color differences overdone for readability. A color X is said to be more or equally red than a color Y if the table cell in row X and column Y is not empty. In that case, if it holds a "≈", then X and Y look indistinguishably equal, and if it holds a ">", then X looks clearly more red than Y. The relation ≥ is the disjoint union of the symmetric relation ≈ and the transitive relation >. Using the transitivity of >, the knowledge of both f10 > d30 and d30 > b50 allows one to infer that f10 > b50. However, since ≥ is not transitive, a "paradoxical" inference like "d30 ≥ e20 and e20 ≥ f10, hence d30 ≥ f10" is no longer possible. For the same reason, e.g. "d30 ≈ e20 and e20 ≈ f10, hence d30 ≈ f10" is no longer a valid inference. Similarly, to resolve the original heap variation of the paradox with this approach, the relation "X grains are more a heap than Y grains" could be considered quasitransitive rather than transitive.

== Continuum fallacy ==
The continuum fallacy (also known as the fallacy of the beard, line-drawing fallacy, or decision-point fallacy) is an informal fallacy related to the sorites paradox. Both fallacies cause one to erroneously reject a vague claim simply because it is not as precise as one would like it to be. Vagueness alone does not necessarily imply invalidity. The fallacy is the argument that two states or conditions cannot be considered distinct (or do not exist at all) because between them there exists a continuum of states.

Strictly, the sorites paradox refers to situations where there are many discrete states (classically between 1 and 1,000,000 grains of sand, hence 1,000,000 possible states), while the continuum fallacy refers to situations where there is (or appears to be) a continuum of states, such as temperature.

For the purpose of the continuum fallacy, one assumes that there is in fact a continuum, though this is generally a minor distinction: in general, any argument against the sorites paradox can also be used against the continuum fallacy. One argument against the fallacy is based on the simple counterexample: there do exist bald people and people who are not bald. Another argument is that for each degree of change in states, the degree of the condition changes slightly, and these slight changes build up to shift the state from one category to another. For example, perhaps the addition of a grain of rice causes the total group of rice to be "slightly more" of a heap, and enough slight changes will certify the group's heap status – see fuzzy logic.

== See also ==
- Ambiguity
- Boiling frog
- Closed concept
- Fuzzy concept
- I know it when I see it
- Imprecise language
- List of fallacies
- Loki's wager
- Ring species
- Ship of Theseus
- Slippery slope
- Straw that broke the camel's back

== Bibliography ==
- Barnes, J. (1982). "Medicine, Experience and Logic". In Barnes, J.; Brunschwig, J.; Burnyeat, M. F.; Schofield, M. (eds.). Science and Speculation. Cambridge: Cambridge University Press.
- Black, Max (1970). Margins of Precision. Ithaca, NY: Cornell University Press. ISBN 978-0-8014-0602-7.
- Burns, Linda Claire (1991). Vagueness: An Investigation into Natural Languages and the Sorites Paradox. Dordrecht: Kluwer Academic Publishers. ISBN 978-0-7923-1489-9.
- Burnyeat, Myles (1982). "15. Gods and heaps". In Schofield, M.; Nussbaum, M. C. (eds.). Language and Logos. Cambridge: Cambridge University Press. pp. 315–.
- Collins, Rory (2018). "On the Borders of Vagueness and the Vagueness of Borders" (PDF). Vassar College Journal of Philosophy. 5: 30–44.
- Dzhafarov, Ehtibar N.; Dzhafarov, Damir D. (2013). "The Sorites Paradox: A Behavioral Approach" (PDF). In Rudolph, Lee (ed.). Qualitative Mathematics for the Social Sciences: Mathematical Models for Research on Cultural Dynamics. pp. 105–136. doi:10.4324/9780203100806. ISBN 9780415444828.
- Gerla (2001). Fuzzy logic: Mathematical Tools for Approximate Reasoning. Dordrecht, Netherlands: Kluwer Academic Publishers. ISBN 978-0-7923-6941-7.
- Ludwig, Kirk; Ray, Greg (2002). "Vagueness and the Sorites Paradox". Philosophical Perspectives. 16: 419–461. JSTOR 3840922.
- Nouwen, Rick; Rooij, Robert van; Sauerland, Uli; Schmitz, Hans-Christian (2009). International Workshop on Vagueness in Communication (ViC; held as part of ESSLLI). LNAI. Vol. 6517. Springer. ISBN 978-3-642-18445-1.
- Oms, Sergi; Zardini, Elia, eds. (2019). The Sorites Paradox. Cambridge University Press.
- Sainsbury, R. M. (2009). Paradoxes (3rd ed.). Cambridge University Press.; Sect.3
