= Closed concept =

Concept in epistemology

A closed concept is a concept where all the necessary and sufficient conditions required to include something within the concept can be listed. For example, the concept of a triangle is closed because it is both necessary and sufficient that something (1) be a polygon and (2) have three sides for it to be a triangle. All the conditions required to call something a triangle can be and are listed.

Its opposite is an "open concept".

== See also ==
- Continuum fallacy
