= Philosophical Issues =

- Discipline: Philosophy
- Language: English
- Edited by: Ernest Sosa, Enrique Villanueva (philosopher)

Publication details
- History: 1991–present
- Publisher: Blackwell Publishing (United States)
- Frequency: Annual

Standard abbreviations
- ISO 4: Philos. Issues

Indexing
- ISSN: 1533-6077 (print); 1758-2237 (web)

Links
- Journal homepage

Philosophical Issues is an annual supplement to the journal Noûs published periodically, usually once per year. Each issue explores a specific area of philosophy through invited papers, critical studies, and book symposia.

Philosophical Issues was published by Ridgeview Publishing Company for the first nine volumes. It became a supplement to Noûs in 2000, and is currently published by Wiley-Blackwell.

== See also ==
- List of philosophy journals
