= Theodore Sider =

American philosopher

- Born: Theodore Ronald Sider
- Other name: Ted Sider

Education
- Education: University of Massachusetts Amherst (PhD, 1993)
- Thesis: Naturalness, Intrinsicality, and Duplication (1993)
- Doctoral advisor: Phillip Bricker
- Other advisors: Fred Feldman, Edmund Gettier, Angelika Kratzer

Philosophical work
- Era: Contemporary philosophy
- Region: Western philosophy
- School: Analytic
- Institutions: University of Rochester, Syracuse University, Rutgers University, New York University, Cornell University
- Main interests: Metaphysics, philosophy of language
- Notable ideas: Ontological four-dimensionalism

Theodore Ronald Sider is an American philosopher specializing in metaphysics and philosophy of language. He is Distinguished Professor of Philosophy at Rutgers University.

== Family ==
Sider is the son of theologian Ronald Sider. He is the partner of Jill North, who is also hired by Rutgers' philosophy faculty.

== Education and career ==
Since earning his Ph.D. from the University of Massachusetts Amherst in 1993, Sider has taught at the University of Rochester, Syracuse University, New York University, Cornell University, and Rutgers University from 2002 to 2007 and again since 2015. He has published three books and some four dozen papers. He has also edited a textbook in metaphysics with John Hawthorne and Dean Zimmerman.

Sider was the recipient of the 2003 APA Book Prize for his book Four-Dimensionalism: An Ontology of Persistence and Time. He gave the John Locke Lectures at Oxford University in 2016.

== Books ==
- Four-Dimensionalism: An Ontology of Persistence and Time (2001). Oxford University Press; Japanese (2007) Shunjusha.
- Riddles of Existence: A Guided Tour of Metaphysics (co-author Earl Conee) (2005). Oxford University Press; Japanese (2009). Shunjusha; Portuguese (2010). Bizâncio.
- Logic for Philosophy (2010). Oxford University Press.
- Writing the Book of the World (2011). Oxford University Press.
- The Tools of Metaphysics and the Metaphysics of Science (2020). Oxford University Press
