= Arthur Lee Dixon =

British mathematician

- Born: 27 November 1867; Pickering, North Riding of Yorkshire
- Died: 20 February 1955 (aged 87); Sandgate, Kent
- Education: Worcester College, Oxford
- Known for: work on analytic number theory and the application of algebra to geometry, elliptic functions and hyperelliptic functions
- Awards: Fellow of the Royal Society
- Scientific career
- Fields: Mathematics
- Workplaces: University of Oxford

Arthur Lee Dixon FRS (27 November 1867 — 20 February 1955) was a British mathematician and holder of the Waynflete Professorship of Pure Mathematics at the University of Oxford.

== Early life and education ==
Dixon was born on 27 November 1867 in Pickering, North Riding of Yorkshire to G.T. Dixon, and was the younger brother of Alfred Cardew Dixon. From 1879 to 1885 he studied at Kingswood School, before matriculating at Worcester College, Oxford as a scholar to study mathematics.

== Academic career ==
Dixon became a Fellow of Merton College in 1891, and Waynflete Professor of Pure Mathematics in 1922.

His research was focused on algebra and its application to geometry, elliptic functions and hyperelliptic functions. From 1908 onwards he published a series of papers on algebraic eliminants. He also published a dozen joint papers with W.L. Ferrar on analytic number theory.

Dixon was the last mathematical professor at Oxford to hold a life tenure, and although he was not particularly noted for his mathematical innovations he did publish many papers on analytic number theory and the application of algebra to geometry, elliptic functions and hyperelliptic functions.

He was elected a Fellow of the Royal Society in 1912 and served as president of the London Mathematical Society from 1924 to 1926.

Dixon died on 20 February 1955.

== Personal life ==
In 1902 Dixon married Catherine Rieder. Catherine found the atmosphere in Oxford difficult for her health, and spent a lot of time in Pau to recover. The couple had one child, a daughter, who later married F.J. Baden Fuller; when Catherine died in 1930, Dixon moved in with his daughter and her husband in Sandgate, Kent, where he spent the rest of his life.
