= Alan Gerber (political scientist) =

Political scientist and professor

Alan Scott Gerber is a political scientist and professor at Yale University. Gerber, a professor of political science, economics, and statistics, previously served as the Faculty of Arts and Sciences dean of social science, and currently holds secondary appointments in both the Yale School of Public Health and the Yale Jackson School of Global Affairs. He was named Sterling Professor in 2022, and prior served as Charles C. and Dorathea S. Dilley Professor of Political Science.

Gerber has received a Bachelor of Arts degree in economics from Yale, as well as a Doctor of Philosophy in economics from the Massachusetts Institute of Technology, completed under James M. Poterba. He was elected to the American Academy of Arts and Sciences in 2009, and is a fellow of both the Society for Political Methodology and the American Academy of Political and Social Science. He has won book and article awards from the American Political Science Association and the National Academy of Public Administration.
