= Dean Zimmerman (philosopher) =

American philosopher

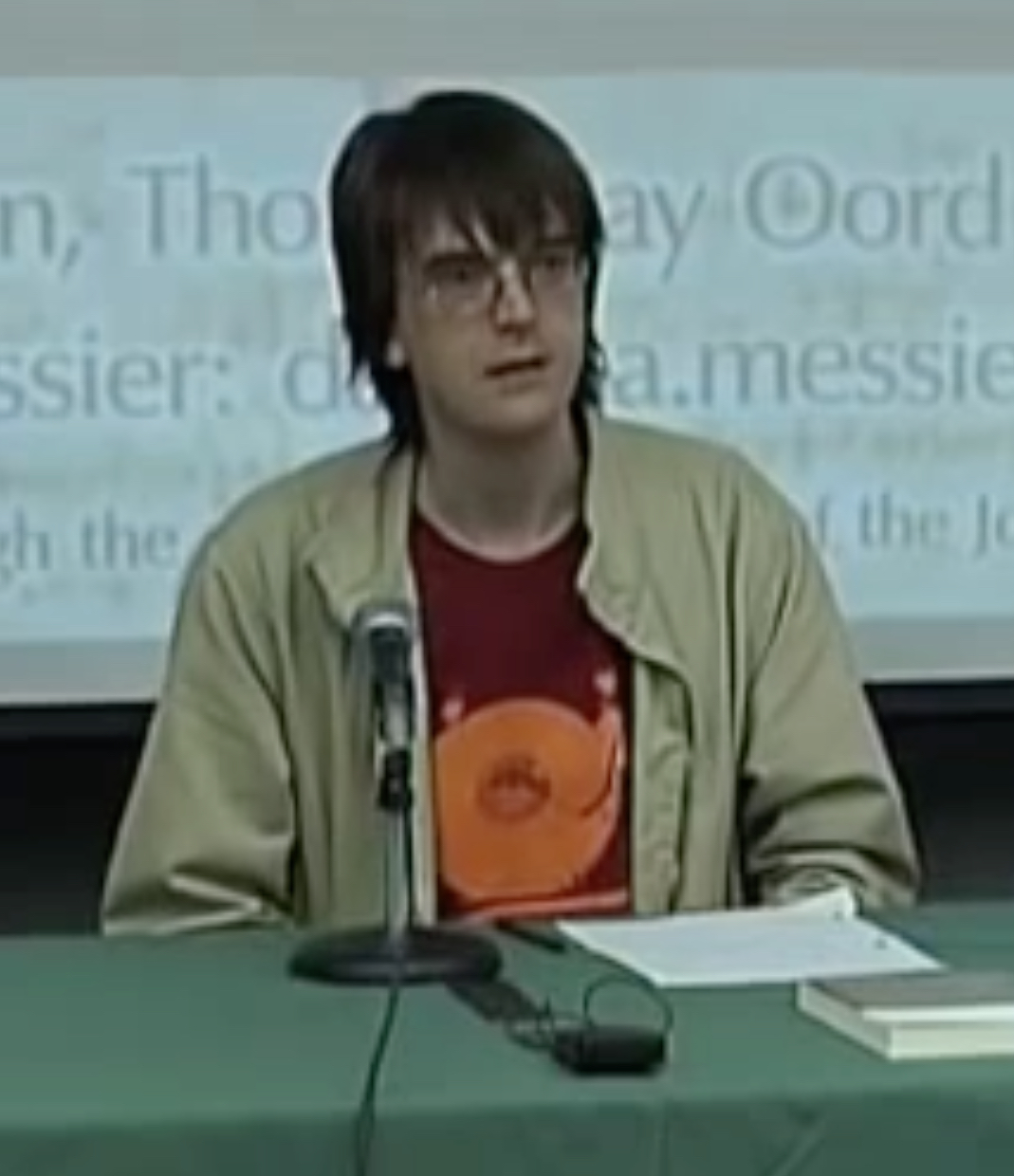

Education
- Education: Mankato State University; Brown University

Philosophical work
- Era: 21st-century philosophy
- Region: Western philosophy
- School: Analytical philosophy
- Institutions: Rutgers University
- Main interests: Metaphysics; philosophy of mind; philosophy of religion

Dean W. Zimmerman is an American professor of philosophy at Rutgers University specializing in metaphysics and philosophy of religion.

== Education and career ==
Zimmerman received his bachelor's degree from Mankato State University in 1987 in French, philosophy, and English. He went on to receive a Master of Arts degree from Brown University in 1990 and then a Doctor of Philosophy degree from the same institution in 1992, where he worked with Jaegwon Kim and Roderick Chisholm. He taught at the University of Notre Dame and Syracuse University prior to joining Rutgers University, where he is also now Director of the Rutgers Center for the Philosophy of Religion. Zimmerman was hired to Rutgers at the same time as John Hawthorne and Ted Sider. Zimmerman is a Christian and a member of the Society of Christian Philosophers. He also serves on the board of advisors of the Marc Sanders Foundation, which awards prizes for outstanding work in philosophy.

== Philosophical work ==
Zimmerman is an influential figure in contemporary metaphysics, and has worked on issues in the philosophy of time, on personhood and material constitution, the metaphysics of mind. In philosophy of religion, Zimmerman has worked on divine foreknowledge and human free will, and God and time. He has defended emergent substance dualism.

He is also a keyboardist for the band Jigs and the Pigs.

== Selected publications ==
Articles

- Dualism in the Philosophy of Mind. In John Corcoran. Encyclopedia of Philosophy, 2nd Edition (Macmillan, 2006)
- From Experience to Experiencer. In Mark Baker and Stewart Goetz. The Soul Hypothesis (Continuum Press, 2011)

Books

- Metaphysics: The Big Questions co-edited with Peter van Inwagen (Blackwell, 1st ed. 1998, 2nd ed. 2008)
- The Oxford Handbook of Metaphysics co-edited with Michael Loux (OUP, 2003)
- Persons: Human and Divine co-edited with Peter van Inwagen (OUP, 2007)
- Contemporary Debates in Metaphysics co-edited with Ted Sider and John Hawthorne (Blackwell, 2008)
- Oxford Studies in Metaphysics co-edited with Karen Bennett (OUP, 2008–2014)
- God in an Open Universe co-edited with William Hasker and Thomas Jay Oord (Pickwick, 2011)

== See also ==
- American philosophy
- List of American philosophers
