= Larry Gladney =

American physicist (born 1957)

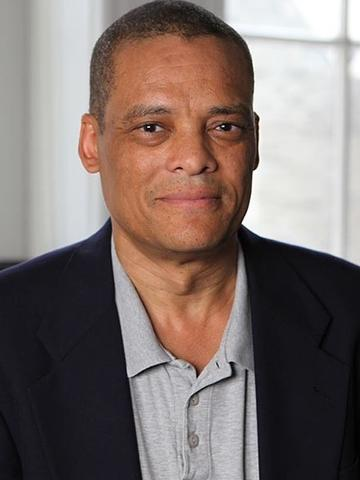
- Born: 1957 (age 68–69); Cleveland, Mississippi, U.S.
- Education: Northwestern University (BA); Stanford University (MS, PhD)
- Awards: Edward A. Bouchet Award (1997); Fellow of the American Physical Society (2015)
- Scientific career
- Fields: Astrophysics; cosmology; particle physics
- Workplaces: University of Pennsylvania; Yale University
- Thesis: Measurement of the lifetimes of the neutral and charged D mesons (1985)

Larry Donnie Gladney (born 1957) is an American experimental particle physicist and cosmologist. He is a professor of physics and divisional dean for science at Yale University.

He previously served as Yale's inaugural Phyllis A. Wallace Dean of Diversity and Faculty Development from 2019 to 2025, and was a professor at the University of Pennsylvania. His research focuses on the origins of matter, energy, space, and time. He has authored or co-authored over 600 peer-reviewed publications.

Gladney has been profiled by organizations including The HistoryMakers and the National Society of Black Physicists, and is included in the Physicists of the African Diaspora project.

== Biography ==
Gladney was born in Cleveland, Mississippi, and raised in East St. Louis, Illinois, graduating from East St. Louis High School in 1975. He received a B.A. in physics from Northwestern University in 1979, followed by an M.S. and a Ph.D. in physics from Stanford University in 1985.

From 1985 to 1988, he was a postdoctoral researcher at the University of Pennsylvania, where he subsequently joined the faculty. He became a full professor at the University of Pennsylvania in 2005 and was appointed the Edmund J. and Louise W. Kahn Professor for Faculty Excellence in 2008. He served as chair of the Department of Physics and Astronomy and chair of the Penn Faculty Senate. He was also associate dean for natural sciences and held a secondary appointment as a professor of education in the Graduate School of Education.

At Penn, he chaired the advisory board for the African-American Resource Center and served as director and principal investigator of the Penn Science Teacher Institute from 2008 to 2012. He was named a Distinguished Fellow of the Netter Center for Community Partnerships.

In January 2019, Gladney joined Yale University as a professor of physics and the inaugural Phyllis A. Wallace Dean of Diversity and Faculty Development within the Faculty of Arts and Sciences. In 2022, he succeeded Jeffrey Brock as divisional dean for science in the Faculty of Arts and Sciences. and his term as diversity dean concluded in June 2025.

== Research ==
Gladney specializes in astroparticle physics, cosmology, and experimental particle physics, focusing his research on the weak interactions of heavy quarks and the nature of dark energy.

=== Particle physics ===
Gladney's early career focused on experimental high-energy physics. At the Collider Detector at Fermilab, he developed third-level tau lepton triggers in 1988 and recorded the first observation of an exclusive B meson decay in a hadron collider environment in 1992. In 2000, he became the U.S. representative to the Computing Coordinating Group for the BaBar collaboration, where he later led the Level 3 Trigger effort for the experiment at the SLAC PEP-II Collider.

=== Cosmology ===
In 2004, Gladney transitioned to experimental cosmology as a visiting scientist at the Lawrence Berkeley National Laboratory, working with the Supernova/Acceleration Probe simulation group led by Saul Perlmutter. He has since contributed to mission planning for the Vera C. Rubin Observatory's Legacy Survey of Space and Time. He serves on the Board of Directors of the LSST Discovery Alliance.

== Service and leadership ==
Gladney has held leadership roles in professional organizations and federal advisory bodies, including serving as a member of the U.S. Army Science Advisory Board from 1997 to 2002. He served on the High Energy Physics Advisory Panel for the Department of Energy and the National Science Foundation from 1998 to 2001 and from 2006 to 2009. He has also served on the Director's Review Board of the Lawrence Berkeley National Laboratory, the Experimental Physics Advisory Committee for the Stanford Linear Accelerator Center, and the Program Advisory Committee for LIGO. Additionally, he served on the QuarkNet Advisory Board and the NSF Advisory and Review Committee for the Origin and Structure of Matter project.

Within the American Physical Society, Gladney was elected chair-elect of the Nominating Committee in 2017 and served as chair in 2019. He has also chaired the organization's Forum on Outreach and Engaging the Public.

== Fellowships and honors ==
- 1989–1994: Presidential Young Investigator, National Science Foundation
- 1990: Lilly Teaching Fellowship
- 1997: Edward A. Bouchet Award, American Physical Society
- 1997: Martin Luther King Jr. Lecturer Award, Wayne State University
- Outstanding Community Service Award, Black Graduate Professional Students' Association, University of Pennsylvania
- Distinguished Fellow, Netter Center for Community Partnerships, University of Pennsylvania
- 2015: Elected Fellow of the American Physical Society
