= Waynflete Professorship =

The Waynflete Professorships are four professorial fellowships at the University of Oxford endowed by Magdalen College and named in honour of the college founder William of Waynflete, who had a great interest in science. These professorships are statutory professorships of the University, that is, they are professorships established in the university's regulations, and which are by those regulations attached to Magdalen College in particular. The oldest professorship is the Waynflete Professor of Metaphysical Philosophy. The three science professorships were created following the recommendation of the University Commission in 1857, in recognition of William of Waynflete's lifetime support of science. The professorships are the Waynflete Professor of Chemistry, the Waynflete Professor of Physiology, and the Waynflete Professor of Pure Mathematics.

== Waynflete Professors of Metaphysical Philosophy ==
This Waynflete Professorship is one of five statutory professorships in philosophy at the University of Oxford, the other four being the Wykeham Professorship in Logic, the White’s Professorship of Moral Philosophy, the Wilde Professor of Mental Philosophy, as well as the untitled professorship in Ancient Philosophy.

- 1859–1867 Henry Longueville Mansel
- 1867–1889 Henry William Chandler
- 1889–1910 Thomas Case
- 1910–1935 John Alexander Smith
- 1935–1941 Robin G. Collingwood
- 1945–1967 Gilbert Ryle
- 1968–1987 P. F. Strawson
- 1989–2000 Christopher Peacocke
- 2003–2006 Dorothy Edgington
- 2006–2015 John Hawthorne
- 2016– Ofra Magidor

== Waynflete Professors of Chemistry ==
The four heads of the Dyson Perrins Laboratory were four consecutive Waynflete Professors of Chemistry, from its foundation in 1916 as the University's research centre for organic chemistry to its relocation in 2003.

- 1865–1872 Sir Benjamin Collins Brodie, 2nd Baronet
- 1872–1912 William Odling
- 1912–1930 William Henry Perkin, Jr., first head of Dyson Perrins Laboratory;
- 1930–1954 Sir Robert Robinson
- 1954–1978 Ewart Jones
- 1978–2005 Sir Jack Baldwin, last head of Dyson Perrins Laboratory;
- 2006–2021 Stephen G. Davies, ex-Chairman of Chemistry.
- 2022– Véronique Gouverneur, from 1 November

== Waynflete Professors of Physiology ==
- 1882–1905 John Scott Burdon-Sanderson
- 1905–1913 Francis Gotch
- 1913–1935 Charles Scott Sherrington
- 1936–1939 John Mellanby
- 1940–1960 Edward George Tandy Liddell
- 1960–1967 George Lindor Brown
- 1968–1979 David Whitteridge
- 1979–2007 Colin Blakemore
- 2007– Gero Miesenböck

== Waynflete Professors of Pure Mathematics ==
- 1892–1921 Edwin Bailey Elliott
- 1922–1945 Arthur Lee Dixon
- 1947–1960 J. H. C. Whitehead
- 1960–1984 Graham Higman
- 1984–2006 Daniel Quillen
- 2007–2013 Raphaël Rouquier
- 2013– Ben Green
