= The Grammar of Meaning =

1997 book

- Author: Mark Norris Lance and John O'Leary-Hawthorne
- Subject: Philosophy
- Publisher: Cambridge University Press
- Publication date: 1997
- Pages: 468
- ISBN: 9780521583008

The Grammar of Meaning: Normativity and Semantic Content is a 1997 book by Mark Norris Lance and John O'Leary-Hawthorne.

== Bibliography ==
- Byrne, Alex (2002). "Semantic Values?". Philosophy and Phenomenological Research. 65 (1): 201–207. ISSN 0031-8205. JSTOR 3071120.
- Horgan, Terry; Tammelleo, Steve (2002). "The Salem Witch Project". Philosophy and Phenomenological Research. 65 (1): 193–200. ISSN 0031-8205. JSTOR 3071119.
- Peregrin, Jaroslav (1998). "Review of The Grammar of Meaning". Erkenntnis. 49 (3): 403–409. ISSN 0165-0106. JSTOR 20012892.
- Schiffer, Stephen (2002). "A Normative Theory of Meaning". Philosophy and Phenomenological Research. 65 (1): 186–192. ISSN 0031-8205. JSTOR 3071118.
