= The Right to Sex =

2021 essay collection by Amia Srinivasan

The Right to Sex: Feminism in the Twenty-First Century
- American cover
- Author: Amia Srinivasan
- Language: English
- Subject: Feminism
- Publisher: Farrar, Straus and Giroux
- Publication date: September 21, 2021
- Pages: 304
- ISBN: 978-0-374-24852-9

The Right to Sex, by Amia Srinivasan, is a 2021 collection of non-fiction feminist essays (published as The Right to Sex: Feminism in the Twenty-First Century in the United States).

== Summary ==
Srinivasan states that The Right to Sex "is a book of feminist essays –on rape and racial oppression, pornography and the internet, sex work and carceralism, pleasure and power, sex and pedagogy, the ethics of sexual desire, and sex and the state." Topics covered include the effect of systemic prejudice and patriarchal expectations on sexual desire, the reinforcement of such standards by a lack of criticism and online pornography, and the consequences of poorly applied intersectionality and reliance on incarceration. The book was on the shortlist for the Orwell Prize for Political Writing in 2022.

== Reception ==
Critical reception of the essay collection was mostly positive. Rafia Zakaria, writing for The Guardian praises the book for its "compelling argument" about pornography. Jennifer Szalai at The New York Times calls the book "compassionate". Jacobin writer Laura Tanenbaum also applauds Srinivasan's writing. In an article for The New Left Review by Caitlín Doherty, Srinivasan is praised for her structure of juxtaposing common assumptions about sex, however, Doherty is dubious of the insights from Srinivasan's study of Oxford students.
