= Definite description =

Denoting phrase in the form of "the X"

In formal semantics and philosophy of language, a definite description (also called singular description) is a denoting phrase in the form of "the X" where X is a noun-phrase or a singular common noun. The definite description is proper if X applies to a unique individual or object. For example: "the first person in space" and "the 42nd President of the United States of America" are proper. The definite descriptions "the person in space" and "the Senator from Ohio" are improper because the noun phrase X applies to more than one thing, and the definite descriptions "the first man on Mars" and "the Senator from Washington, D.C." are improper because X applies to nothing. Improper descriptions raise some difficult questions about the law of excluded middle, denotation, modality, and mental content.

== Russell's analysis ==
As France is currently a republic, it has no king. Bertrand Russell pointed out that this raises a puzzle about the truth value of the sentence "The present King of France is bald."

The sentence does not seem to be true: if we consider all the bald things, the present King of France is not among them, since there is no present King of France. But if it is false, then one would expect that the negation of this statement, that is, "It is not the case that the present King of France is bald", or its logical equivalent, "The present King of France is not bald", is true. But this sentence does not seem to be true either: the present King of France is no more among the things that fail to be bald than among the things that are bald. We therefore seem to have a violation of the law of excluded middle.

Is it meaningless, then? One might suppose so (and some philosophers have) since "the present King of France" certainly does fail to refer. But on the other hand, the sentence "The present King of France is bald" (as well as its negation) seem perfectly intelligible, suggesting that "the present King of France" cannot be meaningless.

Russell proposed to resolve this puzzle via his theory of descriptions. A definite description like "the present King of France", he suggested, is not a referring expression, as we might naively suppose, but rather an "incomplete symbol" that introduces quantificational structure into sentences in which it occurs. The sentence "the present King of France is bald", for example, is analyzed as a conjunction of the following three quantified statements:

1. there is an x such that x is currently King of France: $\exists xKx$ (using 'Kx' for 'x is currently King of France')
2. for any x and y, if x is currently King of France and y is currently King of France, then x=y (i.e. there is at most one thing which is currently King of France): $\forall x \forall y ((Kx \land Ky) \rightarrow x=y)$
3. for every x that is currently King of France, x is bald: $\forall x (Kx \rightarrow Bx)$ (using 'B' for 'bald')

More briefly put, the claim is that "The present King of France is bald" says that some x is such that x is currently King of France, and that any y is currently King of France only if y = x, and that x is bald:

$\exists x((Kx \land \forall y(Ky \rightarrow y =x)) \land Bx)$

This is false, since it is not the case that some x is currently King of France.

The negation of this sentence, i.e. "The present King of France is not bald", is ambiguous. It could mean one of two things, depending on where we place the negation 'not'. On one reading, it could mean that there is no one who is currently King of France and bald:

$\lnot \exists x ((Kx \land \forall y (Ky \rightarrow y = x)) \land Bx)$

On this disambiguation, the sentence is true (since there is indeed no x that is currently King of France).

On a second reading, the negation could be construed as attaching directly to 'bald', so that the sentence means that there is currently a King of France, but that this King fails to be bald:

$\exists x ((Kx \land \forall y (Ky \rightarrow y = x)) \land \lnot Bx)$

On this disambiguation, the sentence is false (since there is no x that is currently King of France).

Thus, whether "the present King of France is not bald" is true or false depends on how it is interpreted at the level of logical form: if the negation is construed as taking wide scope (as in the first of the above), it is true, whereas if the negation is construed as taking narrow scope (as in the second of the above), it is false. In neither case does it lack a truth value.

So we do not have a failure of the Law of Excluded Middle: "the present King of France is bald" (i.e. $\exists x((Kx \land \forall y(Ky \rightarrow y =x)) \land Bx)$) is false, because there is no present King of France.

The negation of this statement is the one in which 'not' takes wide scope: $\lnot \exists x ((Kx \land \forall y (Ky \rightarrow y = x)) \land Bx)$. This statement is true because there does not exist anything which is currently King of France.

== Generalized quantifier analysis ==
Stephen Neale, among others, has defended Russell's theory, and incorporated it into the theory of generalized quantifiers. On this view, 'the' is a quantificational determiner like 'some', 'every', 'most' etc. The determiner 'the' has the following denotation (using lambda notation):

$\lambda f. \lambda g.\exists x(f(x)=1 \land \forall y(f(y)=1 \rightarrow y=x) \land g(x) = 1)$

(That is, the definite article 'the' denotes a function which takes a pair of properties f and g to truth if, and only if, there exists something that has the property f, only one thing has the property f, and that thing also has the property g.) Given the denotation of the predicates 'present King of France' (again K for short) and 'bald' (B for short)

$\lambda x.Kx$
$\lambda x.Bx$

we then get the Russellian truth conditions via two steps of function application: 'The present King of France is bald' is true if, and only if, $\exists x((Kx \land \forall y(Ky \rightarrow y =x)) \land Bx)$. On this view, definite descriptions like 'the present King of France' do have a denotation (specifically, definite descriptions denote a function from properties to truth values—they are in that sense not syncategorematic, or "incomplete symbols"); but the view retains the essentials of the Russellian analysis, yielding exactly the truth conditions Russell argued for.

== Fregean analysis ==
The Fregean analysis of definite descriptions, implicit in the work of Frege and later defended by Strawson among others, represents the primary alternative to the Russellian theory. On the Fregean analysis, definite descriptions are construed as referring expressions rather than quantificational expressions. Existence and uniqueness are understood as a presupposition of a sentence containing a definite description, rather than part of the content asserted by such a sentence. The sentence 'The present King of France is bald', for example, is not used to claim that there exists a unique present King of France who is bald; instead, that there is a unique present King of France is part of what this sentence presupposes, and what it says is that this individual is bald. If the presupposition fails, the definite description fails to refer, and the sentence as a whole fails to express a proposition.

The Fregean view is thus committed to the kind of truth value gaps (and failures of the law of excluded middle) that the Russellian analysis is designed to avoid. Since there is currently no King of France, the sentence 'The present King of France is bald' fails to express a proposition, and therefore fails to have a truth value, as does its negation, 'The present King of France is not bald'. The Fregean will account for the fact that these sentences are nevertheless meaningful by relying on speakers' knowledge of the conditions under which either of these sentences could be used to express a true proposition. The Fregean can also hold on to a restricted version of the law of excluded middle: for any sentence whose presuppositions are met (and thus expresses a proposition), either that sentence or its negation is true.

On the Fregean view, the definite article 'the' has the following denotation (using lambda notation):

$\lambda f: \exists x(f(x)=1 \land \forall y(f(y)=1 \rightarrow y=x)).$ [The unique z such that $f(z)=1$]

(That is, 'the' denotes a function which takes a property f and yields the unique object z that has property f, if there is such a z, and is undefined otherwise.) The presuppositional character of the existence and uniqueness conditions is here reflected in the fact that the definite article denotes a partial function on the set of properties: it is only defined for those properties f which are true of exactly one object. It is thus undefined on the denotation of the predicate 'currently King of France', since the property of currently being King of France is true of no object; it is similarly undefined on the denotation of the predicate 'Senator of the US', since the property of being a US Senator is true of more than one object.

== Mathematical logic ==
Following the example of Principia Mathematica, it is customary to use a definite description operator symbolized using the "turned" (rotated) Greek lower case iota character "℩". The notation ℩$x(\phi x)$ means "the unique $x$ such that $\phi x$", and

$\psi($℩$x(\phi x))$

is equivalent to "There is exactly one $\phi$ and it has the property $\psi$":

$\exists x (\forall y (\phi(y) \iff y=x) \land \psi(x))$

== See also ==
- Lambert's law
- Vacuous truth

== Bibliography ==
- Donnellan, Keith, "Reference and Definite Descriptions," in Philosophical Review 75 (1966): 281–304.
- Neale, Stephen, Descriptions, MIT Press, 1990.
- Ostertag, Gary (ed.). (1998) Definite Descriptions: A Reader Bradford, MIT Press. (Includes Donnellan (1966), Chapter 3 of Neale (1990), Russell (1905), and Strawson (1950).)
- Reimer, Marga and Bezuidenhout, Anne (eds.) (2004), Descriptions and Beyond, Clarendon Press, Oxford
- Russell, Bertrand, "On Denoting," in Mind 14 (1905): 479–493. Online text.
- Strawson, P. F., "On Referring," in Mind 59 (1950): 320–344.
