= Noûs =

Quarterly peer-reviewed academic journal on philosophy

- Discipline: Philosophy
- Language: English
- Edited by: Ernest Sosa

Publication details
- History: 1967–present
- Publisher: Wiley-Blackwell
- Frequency: Quarterly

Standard abbreviations
- ISO 4: Noûs

Indexing
- ISSN: 0029-4624 (print); 1468-0068 (web)
- LCCN: sf77000049
- JSTOR: 00294624
- OCLC no.: 40108866

Links
- Journal homepage; Online access; Online archive

Noûs is a quarterly peer-reviewed academic journal on philosophy published by Wiley-Blackwell. It was established in 1967 by Hector-Neri Castañeda and is currently edited by Ernest Sosa (Rutgers University). The journal is accompanied by two annual supplements, Philosophical Issues and Philosophical Perspectives.

== See also ==
- List of philosophy journals
