= Timothy Williamson =

British philosopher (born 1955)

Timothy Williamson FRSE FBA
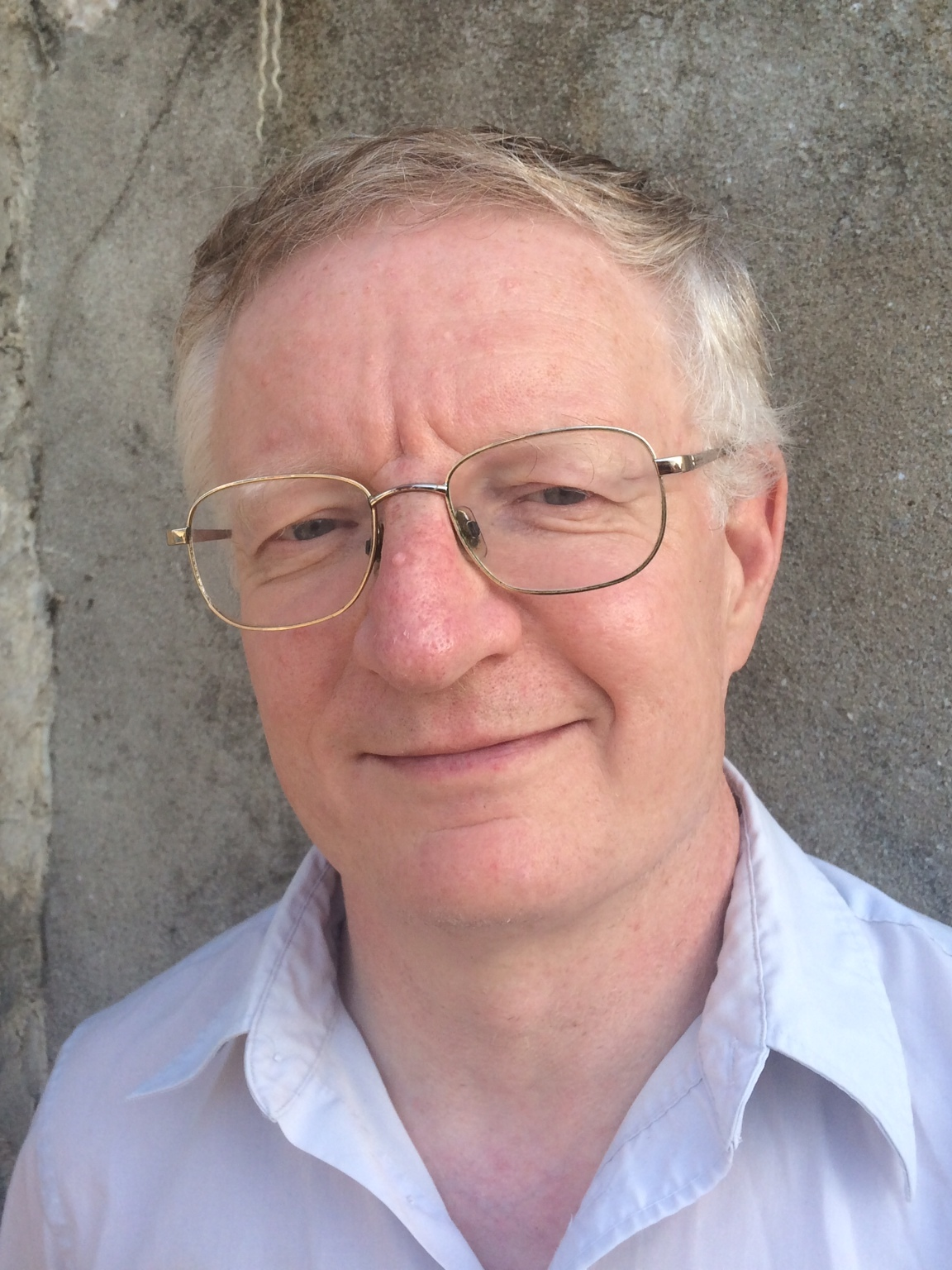
- Williamson in 2014
- Born: 6 August 1955 (age 71); Uppsala, Sweden

Education
- Education: Balliol College, Oxford
- Thesis: The Concept of Approximation to the Truth (1980)
- Doctoral advisor: Michael Dummett; William Newton-Smith

Philosophical work
- Era: Contemporary philosophy
- Region: Western philosophy
- School: Analytic philosophy
- Institutions: Trinity College, Dublin; University College, Oxford; University of Edinburgh; New College, Oxford
- Doctoral students: Maria Baghramian; Amia Srinivasan
- Main interests: Philosophical logic; philosophy of language; epistemology; metaphysics
- Notable ideas: Epistemicism; knowledge as conceptually primitive; knowledge-first epistemology; modal logic as metaphysics; absolute generality

Timothy Williamson (born 6 August 1955) is a British philosopher whose main research interests are in philosophical logic, philosophy of language, epistemology and metaphysics. He is the former Wykeham Professor of Logic at the University of Oxford, and a fellow of New College, Oxford.

== Education and career ==
Born on 6 August 1955, Williamson's education began at Leighton Park School and continued at Henley Grammar School (now the Henley College). He then went to Balliol College, Oxford University. He graduated in 1976 with a Bachelor of Arts degree with first-class honours in mathematics and philosophy, and in 1980 with a doctorate in philosophy (DPhil) for a thesis entitled The Concept of Approximation to the Truth.

Williamson was professor of logic and metaphysics at the University of Edinburgh (1995–2000), fellow and lecturer in philosophy at University College, Oxford (1988–1994), and lecturer in philosophy at Trinity College, Dublin (1980–1988). He took up the Wykeham Professorship in 2000 and retired in 2023, when he took up a Senior Research and Teaching Fellowship in Philosophy.

He has been visiting professor at Yale University, Princeton University, MIT, the University of Michigan, and the Chinese University of Hong Kong.

He was president of the Aristotelian Society from 2004 to 2005.

He is a Fellow of the British Academy (FBA), the Norwegian Academy of Science and Letters, Fellow of the Royal Society of Edinburgh (FRSE), and a Foreign Honorary Fellow of the American Academy of Arts & Sciences.

Since 2022 he is visiting professor at the Università della Svizzera Italiana.

== Philosophical work ==
Williamson has contributed to analytic philosophy of language, logic, metaphysics, epistemology, metaethics and metaphilosophy.

On vagueness, he holds a position known as epistemicism, which states that every seemingly vague predicate (like "bald" or "thin") actually has a sharp cutoff, which is impossible for us to know. For instance, there is some number of hairs such that anyone with that number is bald, and anyone with even one more hair is not. In actuality, this condition will be spelled out only partly in terms of numbers of hairs, but whatever measures are relevant will have some sharp cutoff. This solution to the difficult Sorites paradox was considered a surprising and unacceptable consequence, but has become a relatively mainstream view since his defence of it. Williamson is fond of using the statement, "no one knows whether I am thin" to illustrate his view.

In epistemology, Williamson suggests that knowledge is unanalysable. This went against the common trend in philosophical literature up to that point, which was to argue that knowledge could be analysed into constituent concepts. (Typically, this would be justified true belief plus an extra factor.) He agrees that knowledge entails justification, truth and belief, but argues that it is conceptually primitive. He accounts for the importance of belief by discussing its connections with knowledge, but avoids the disjunctivist position of saying that belief can be analysed as the disjunction of knowledge with some distinct, non-factive mental state.

Williamson also argues against the traditional distinction of knowing-how and knowing-that. He claims that knowledge-how is a type of knowledge-that. Williamson argues that knowledge-how does not relate one's ability. He provides the example of a ski instructor who knows how to perform a complex move without having the ability to do it himself.

In metaphysics, Williamson defends necessitism, according to which necessarily everything is necessarily something; in short, that everything exists of necessity. Likewise, it is possible for something to have a property only if there is something which has that property. For instance, since it is possible for Wittgenstein to have had a child, there is something which is a possible child of Wittgenstein. Necessitism is a theoretical interpretation of the Barcan formula, which is a theorem of the modal logic S5. However, Williamson has also developed an ontology of “bare possibilia” which he argues accounts for the seemingly unintuitive consequences of necessitism.

== Publications ==
- Identity and Discrimination, Oxford: Blackwell, 1990.
- Vagueness, London: Routledge, 1994.
- Knowledge and Its Limits, Oxford: Oxford University Press, 2000.
- The Philosophy of Philosophy, Oxford: Blackwell, 2007
  - The Philosophy of Philosophy (2nd ed.), Hoboken: Wiley Blackwell, 2022.
- Modal Logic as Metaphysics, Oxford: Oxford University Press, 2013.
- Tetralogue: I'm Right, You're Wrong, Oxford: Oxford University Press, 2015.
- Doing Philosophy: From Common Curiosity to Logical Reasoning, Oxford University Press, 2017.
- Suppose and Tell: The Semantics and Heuristics of Conditionals, Oxford University Press, 2020.
- Debating the A Priori (with Paul Boghossian), Oxford University Press, 2020.
- Overfitting and Heuristics in Philosophy, Oxford University Press, 2024.
- Good as Usual: Anti-Exceptionalist Essays on Values, Norms and Actions, Oxford University Press, 2025.

Williamson has also published more than 120 articles in peer-reviewed scholarly journals.

Academic offices
Preceded by David Wiggins	Wykeham Professor of Logic; 2000–2023	Incumbent
Professional and academic associations
Preceded by Paul Snowdon	President of the Aristotelian Society; 2004–2005	Succeeded by Myles Burnyeat
