= Amia Srinivasan =

Philosopher

- Born: 20 December 1984 (age 41); Bahrain

Education
- Education: Yale University (BA); Corpus Christi College, Oxford (BPhil, DPhil)
- Thesis: The Fragile Estate (2014)
- Doctoral advisor: John Hawthorne; Timothy Williamson

Philosophical work
- Era: Contemporary philosophy
- Region: Western philosophy
- School: Analytic philosophy
- Institutions: University College London; St John's College, Oxford; All Souls College, Oxford
- Main interests: Epistemology; Political philosophy Feminist philosophy

Amia Srinivasan (born 20 December 1984) is a philosopher and author noted for her work in epistemology and feminist philosophy. Since January 2020, she has been Chichele Professor of Social and Political Theory at the University of Oxford.

== Early life and education ==
Srinivasan was born on 20 December 1984 in Bahrain to Indian parents and later lived in Taiwan, Singapore, New York, and London. She graduated from Yale University with a Bachelor of Arts in philosophy in 2007. This was followed by postgraduate Bachelor of Philosophy (BPhil) and Doctor of Philosophy (DPhil) degrees as a Rhodes Scholar at Corpus Christi College, University of Oxford. Her BPhil was completed in 2009 with a thesis titled Experimental Philosophy and Armchair Philosophy, supervised by John Hawthorne. She completed her DPhil in 2014 with a thesis titled The Fragile Estate: Essays on Luminosity, Normativity and Metaphilosophy; her doctoral supervisors were John Hawthorne and Timothy Williamson.

== Academic career ==
In 2009, she was named a examination fellow at All Souls College, Oxford. In 2015, she was appointed as a lecturer in philosophy at University College London (UCL). In 2016, she was awarded a Leverhulme Research Fellowship for the project "At the Depths of Believing". She has held visiting fellowships at the University of California, Los Angeles; Yale University; and New York University.

In October 2018, Srinivasan joined St John's College, Oxford, as a tutorial fellow in philosophy. She was also an associate professor of philosophy in the Faculty of Philosophy, University of Oxford, from 2018 to 2019. In January 2020, she took up the appointment of Chichele Professor of Social and Political Theory at All Souls College, Oxford. She was invited to give the first of the Winter Lectures sponsored by the London Review of Books in 2025, speaking about psychoanalytic theory.

In 2023, Srinivasan ranked number forty-eight in the New Statesman’s list of influential British progressive political figures.

== Writing ==
Srinivasan was an associate editor for the philosophy journal Mind from 2015 to 2021 and has been associate editor of The Journal of Political Philosophy since 2023.

Srinivasan is a contributing editor of the London Review of Books.

In 2021, Srinivasan published a collection of essays entitled The Right to Sex.

== Bibliography ==
=== Books ===
- The Right to Sex (Bloomsbury, 2021) ISBN 9781526612533

=== Articles ===
- "Normativity Without Cartesian Privilege". Philosophical Issues. 25: 273–299. 2015. doi:10.1111/phis.12059. ISSN 1533-6077. JSTOR 26611132.
- "Are We Luminous?". Philosophy and Phenomenological Research. 90 (2): 294–319. 12 March 2015. doi:10.1111/phpr.12067. ISSN 0031-8205.
- "The Aptness of Anger". Journal of Political Philosophy. 26 (2): 123–144. 9 July 2017. doi:10.1111/jopp.12130. ISSN 0963-8016.
- "Genealogy, Epistemology and Worldmaking" (PDF). Proceedings of the Aristotelian Society. 119 (2): 127–156. July 2019. doi:10.1093/arisoc/aoz009.
- "Radical Externalism". The Philosophical Review. 129 (3): 395–431. 1 July 2020. doi:10.1215/00318108-8311261. ISSN 0031-8108.
- "The sex wars: feminism and its fault lines". Annals of Activism. The New Yorker. 97 (28): 20–26. 13 September 2021.
- "Of money and men: Emily Ratajkowski in conversation". Interview. 16 November 2021.

Academic offices
Vacant Title last held by Jeremy Waldron	Chichele Professor of Social and Political Theory; 2020–present	Incumbent
