= Oxford Studies in Metaphysics =

Oxford Studies in Metaphysics is a series of anthology books on metaphysics published by Oxford University Press. The series editors are Karen Bennett and Dean Zimmerman.
