= Dorothy Edgington =

British philosopher (born 1941)

- Born: 29 April 1941 (age 85)
- Spouse: John Edgington

Philosophical work
- Era: Contemporary philosophy
- Region: Western philosophy
- School: Analytic philosophy
- Main interests: Philosophical logic, vagueness, conditionals, probability

Dorothy Margaret Doig Edgington FBA (née Milne, born 29 April 1941) is a British philosopher active in metaphysics and philosophical logic. She is particularly known for her work on the logic of conditionals and vagueness.

== Life and education ==
Dorothy Edgington was born on 29 April 1941 to Edward Milne and his wife Rhoda née Blair. She attended St Leonards School before going to St Hilda's College, Oxford to read PPE. She obtained her BA in 1964, followed in 1967 by a BPhil at Nuffield College, Oxford.

== Career ==
Most of Edgington's career was spent at Birkbeck College. In 1968, her first academic post was as a Lecturer in Philosophy at Birkbeck, remaining there until 1996. From 1996 until 2001, she was appointed Fellow of University College, Oxford. This was followed by a professorship at Birkbeck from 2001 to 2003. She was then Waynflete Professor of Metaphysical Philosophy at the University of Oxford from 2003 until 2006. Currently, she is a professor emeritus and a Fellow of Magdalen College, Oxford who teaches at Birkbeck again part-time.

Birkbeck College hosts a lecture series named after Edgington. The lectures were given by John McDowell in 2012, given by Rae Langton in 2014, and the Edgington Lectures were given by Kit Fine in 2016.

From 2004 to 2005, she was President of the Mind Association. Later, she became President of the Aristotelian Society from 2007 to 2008. She is a Fellow of the British Academy.

In 2023, she was elected a member of the Academia Europaea.

== Selected publications ==
- 'The Paradox of Knowability' (1985), Mind 94:557–568. Presents a resolution of Fitch's paradox based on situation semantics.
- 'On Conditionals' (1995), Mind 104:235–329. Defends an epistemic theory of conditionals against a truth-functional one, as part of the Mind's state of the art series.
- 'Vagueness by Degrees'. In Rosanna Keefe & Peter Smith (eds.), Vagueness: A Reader. MIT Press (1997)
- 'Counterfactuals and the Benefit of Hindsight'. In Phil Dowe & Paul Noordhof (eds.), Cause and Chance: Causation in an Indeterministic World. Routledge (2004)
- Conditionals (2006), The Stanford Encyclopedia of Philosophy.
