= Edwin Bailey Elliott =

British mathematician (1851–1937)

Edwin Bailey Elliott FRS (1 June 1851, Oxford – 21 July 1937, Oxford) was an English mathematician who worked on invariant theory. In 1892, he was appointed Waynflete Professor of Pure Mathematics at Oxford. He was elected a fellow of the Royal Society in 1891. He wrote the book An introduction to the algebra of quantics, on invariant theory (Elliott 1913).

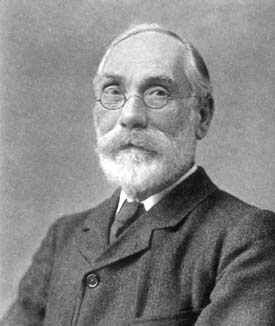
portrait of Edwin Bailey Elliott

== Publications ==
- Elliott, Edwin Bailey (1913) [1895], An introduction to the algebra of quantics. (2nd ed.), Oxford. Clarendon Press, JFM 26.0135.01

== Bibliography ==
- Deaths. The Times, Jul 23, 1937; Issue 47744; pg. 1; col A
