= Epistemicism =

Philosophical concept about vagueness

Epistemicism is a position about vagueness in the philosophy of language or metaphysics, according to which there are facts about the boundaries of a vague predicate which we cannot possibly discover. Given a vague predicate, such as 'is thin' or 'is bald', epistemicists hold that there is some sharp cutoff, dividing cases where a person, for example, is thin from those in which they are not. As a result, a statement such as "Saul is thin" is either true or false. The statement does not, as other theories of vagueness might claim, lack a truth-value – even if the determinate truth-value is beyond our epistemological grasp. Epistemicism gets its name because it holds that there is no semantic indeterminacy present in vague terms, only epistemic uncertainty.

== See also ==
- Sorites paradox
