= Milette Gaifman =

American classicist

Milette Gaifman is a historian of ancient art and archaeology. In 2022 she was named the Andrew Downey Orrick Professor of Classics and History of Art at Yale University. Her scholarship focuses on Greek art of the Archaic and Classical periods.

== Biography ==
Gaifman received her B.A. from the Hebrew University of Jerusalem in 1997 and her Ph.D. from Princeton University in 2005. She was a visiting scholar at Corpus Christi College, Oxford, from 2008 to 2009, and she joined the faculty of the Department of the History of Art at Yale University in 2009. She was an invited professor at Paris Diderot University in 2015.

She was the Co-Editor in Chief of The Art Bulletin from 2018 to 2019.

== Research ==
Gaifman has published extensively on the art and archaeology of the ancient world. She is the author of two books, Aniconism in Greek Antiquity, for which she received the Gaddis Smith International Book Prize, and The Art of Libation in Classical Athens. She has a forthcoming book titled Classification and the History of Greek Art and Architecture, which is revised and expanded from the distinguished Louise Smith Bross Lectures delivered at the Art Institute of Chicago and the Department of Art History at the University of Chicago in 2018.

She has written numerous articles and chapters on various aspects of ancient art and archaeology as well as on the historiography of the field.

== Teaching ==
Gaifman teaches the lecture course Art and Myth in Greek Antiquity, which has repeatedly been the most popular undergraduate class in the humanities at Yale.
