= Philosophical Perspectives =

- Discipline: Philosophy
- Language: English
- Edited by: Ernest Sosa

Publication details
- History: 1987–present
- Publisher: Wiley-Blackwell
- Frequency: Annually

Standard abbreviations
- ISO 4: Philos. Perspect.

Indexing
- ISSN: 1520-8583
- LCCN: 88649942
- JSTOR: 15208583
- OCLC no.: 40108872

Links
- Journal homepage; Online access; Online archive

Philosophical Perspectives is an annual peer-reviewed academic journal of philosophy. Each annual volume is dedicated to a specific theme addressing philosophical problems. The founding editor-in-chief was James E. Tomberlin, who edited the series from 1987 to 2002. Philosophical Perspectives became a supplement to Noûs in 1996 and is currently published by Wiley-Blackwell.

== See also ==
- List of philosophy journals
