= Failure to refer =

Concept in the philosophy of language

In the philosophy of language, failure to refer, also reference failure, referential failure or failure of reference, is the concept that names can fail to name a real object. According to Bertrand Russell's theory of truth, there is only one actual world, and a statement's truth value depends on whether the statement obtains in the actual world. Continuing the tradition of Gottlob Frege, Bertrand Russell posited that a name picks out, or refers to, a real object in the world (Russell's correspondence theory of truth). The name Genghis Khan thus picks out the 12th and 13th century Mongol leader we know by that name. Any sentence in which we attach a predicate to the name Genghis Khan is true if the predicate obtains in the actual world. Any sentence in which the predicate does not obtain for Genghis Khan is false. The Wikipedia statement “Genghis Khan founded the largest contiguous empire in world history” is thus true, and the statement “Genghis Khan was one of the most successful playwrights of late Victorian London” is false. As an example for a name that fails to refer to a real object, Russell used “the present king of France“ in a 1905 article.

== Truth values in fictional world ==
=== Distinguishing between fictional statements and false statements ===
According to the Russellian theory of reference, the statement "Long John Silver has a wooden leg" and the statement "Earth's moon has a diameter of four meters" are both false. The first statement suffers reference failure, because it fails to pick out an individual in the actual world. The second sentence refers to an object in the actual world, but the predicate does not match the actual world, the actual diameter being more than 3470 km. Russell's theory thus does not assign different truth-values to the two statements.

=== True and false statements in fiction ===
In the Russellian system, the statement "Long John Silver has a wooden leg" and the statement "Long John Silver was one of the most successful playwrights of late Victorian London" have the same truth value: false. This equality may present problems for those wishing to distinguish such statements in terms of truth value.

=== Real referents in fictional worlds ===
Some statements are false with reference to the actual world but potentially true in reference to some fictional world. Coleridge's poem "Kubla Khan" ("In Xanadu did Kubla Khan a stately pleasure-dome decree") does not, strictly speaking, suffer reference failure. The 18th century version of the name Kublai Khan picks out a Mongol emperor, the grandson of Genghis Khan. But since few of the events in Coleridge's narrative poem obtain in the actual world, according to Russellian logic, most statements in the poem are false.

== See also ==
- Definite description
