= Vagueness =

Property of predicates in linguistics and philosophy

In linguistics and philosophy, a vague predicate is one which gives rise to borderline cases. For example, the English adjective "tall" is vague since it is not clearly true or false for someone of middling height. By contrast, the word "prime" is not vague since every number is definitively either prime or not. Vagueness is commonly diagnosed by a predicate's ability to give rise to the Sorites paradox. Vagueness is separate from ambiguity, in which an expression has multiple denotations. For instance the word "bank" is ambiguous since it can refer either to a river bank or to a financial institution, but there are no borderline cases between both interpretations.

Vagueness is a major topic of research in philosophical logic, where it serves as a potential challenge to classical logic. Work in formal semantics has sought to provide a compositional semantics for vague expressions in natural language. Work in philosophy of language has addressed implications of vagueness for the theory of meaning, while metaphysicians have considered whether reality itself is vague.

== Importance ==
The concept of vagueness has philosophical importance. Suppose one wants to come up with a definition of "right" in the moral sense. One wants a definition to cover actions that are clearly right and exclude actions that are clearly wrong, but what does one do with the borderline cases? Surely, there are such cases. Some philosophers say that one should try to come up with a definition that is itself unclear on just those cases. Others say that one has an interest in making his or her definitions more precise than ordinary language, or his or her ordinary concepts, themselves allow; they recommend one advances precising definitions.

=== In law ===
Vagueness is also a problem which arises in law, and in some cases, judges have to arbitrate regarding whether a borderline case does, or does not, satisfy a given vague concept. Examples include disability (how much loss of vision is required before one is legally blind?), human life (at what point from conception to birth is one a legal human being, protected for instance by laws against murder?), adulthood (most familiarly reflected in legal ages for driving, drinking, voting, consensual sex, etc.), race (how to classify someone of mixed racial heritage), etc. Even such apparently unambiguous concepts such as biological sex can be subject to vagueness problems, not just from transsexuals' gender transitions but also from certain genetic conditions which can give an individual mixed male and female biological traits (see intersex).

=== In science ===
Many scientific concepts are of necessity vague, for instance species in biology cannot be precisely defined, owing to unclear cases such as ring species. Nonetheless, the concept of species can be clearly applied in the vast majority of cases. As this example illustrates, to say that a definition is "vague" is not necessarily a criticism. Consider those animals in Alaska that are the result of breeding huskies and wolves: are they dogs? It is not clear: they are borderline cases of dogs. This means one's ordinary concept of doghood is not clear enough to let us rule conclusively in this case.

== Approaches ==
The philosophical question of what the best theoretical treatment of vagueness is—which is closely related to the problem of the paradox of the heap, a.k.a. sorites paradox—has been the subject of much philosophical debate.

=== Fuzzy logic ===
In fuzzy logic, e.g. the predicates cold, warm, and hot apply gradually (vertical axis, 0 and 1 meaning certainly not and certainly, respectively) to a given temperature (horizontal axis).

One theoretical approach is that of fuzzy logic, developed by American mathematician Lotfi Zadeh.

A basic difference between perception and measurement is that, in general, measurements are crisp whereas perceptions are fuzzy. In a fundamental way, this is the reason why to deal with perceptions it is necessary to employ a logical system that is fuzzy rather than crisp.

— L. A. Zadeh

Fuzzy logic proposes a gradual transition between "perfect falsity", for example, the statement "Bill Clinton is bald", to "perfect truth", for, say, "Patrick Stewart is bald". In ordinary logics, there are only two truth-values: "true" and "false". The fuzzy perspective differs by introducing an infinite number of truth-values along a spectrum between perfect truth and perfect falsity. Perfect truth may be represented by "1", and perfect falsity by "0". Borderline cases are thought of as having a "truth-value" anywhere between 0 and 1 (for example, 0.6).

Advocates of the fuzzy logic approach have included K. F. Machina (1976) and Dorothy Edgington (1993).

=== Supervaluationism ===
Another theoretical approach is known as "supervaluationism". This approach has been defended by Kit Fine and Rosanna Keefe. Fine argues that borderline applications of vague predicates are neither true nor false, but rather are instances of "truth value gaps". He defends an interesting and sophisticated system of vague semantics, based on the notion that a vague predicate might be "made precise" in many alternative ways. This system has the consequence that borderline cases of vague terms yield statements that are neither true, nor false.

Given a supervaluationist semantics, one can define the predicate "supertrue" as meaning "true on all precisifications". This predicate will not change the semantics of atomic statements (e.g. "Frank is bald", where Frank is a borderline case of baldness), but does have consequences for logically complex statements. In particular, the tautologies of sentential logic, such as "Frank is bald or Frank is not bald", will turn out to be supertrue, since on any precisification of baldness, either "Frank is bald" or "Frank is not bald" will be true. Since the presence of borderline cases seems to threaten principles like this one (excluded middle), the fact that supervaluationism can "rescue" them is seen as a virtue.

=== Subvaluationism ===
Subvaluationism is another theoretical approach with the same goal as supervaluationism, which is its logical dual. It has been defended by Dominic Hyde and Mark Colyvan, as well as by Pablo Cobreros. Whereas the supervaluationist characterises truth as "supertruth", the subvaluationist characterises truth as "subtruth", or "true on at least some precisifications".

Subvaluationism proposes that borderline applications of vague terms are both true and false. It thus has "truth-value gluts". According to this theory, a vague statement is true if it is true on at least one precisification and false if it is false under at least one precisification. If a vague statement comes out true under one precisification and false under another, it is both true and false. Subvaluationism ultimately amounts to the claim that vagueness is a truly contradictory phenomenon. Of a borderline case of "bald man", it would be both true and false to say that he is bald, and both true and false to say that he is not bald.

=== Epistemicist view ===
A fourth approach, known as the epistemicist view, has been defended by Timothy Williamson (1994), R. A. Sorensen (1988) and (2001), and Nicholas Rescher (2009). They maintain that vague predicates do, in fact, draw sharp boundaries, but that one cannot know where these boundaries lie. One's confusion about whether some vague word does or does not apply in a borderline case is due to one's ignorance. For example, in the epistemicist view, there is a fact of the matter, for every person, about whether that person is old or not old; some people are ignorant of this fact.

=== As a property of objects ===
One possibility is that our words and concepts are—or can be—perfectly precise, while (some) objects themselves are vague. Consider Peter Unger's example of a cloud (from his famous 1980 paper, "The Problem of the Many"): it is not clear where the boundary of a cloud lies; for any given bit of water-vapor, one can ask whether it is part of the cloud or not, and for many such bits, one will not know how to answer. Hence, perhaps such a term as "cloud" is not itself vague, but rather precisely denotes a vague object.

This strategy has occasionally been poorly received; most notably, in Gareth Evans' 1978 paper "Can There Be Vague Objects?", wherein an argument is examined which appears to show that vague identity-statements are impossible (i.e., result in logical incoherence). David Lewis explains that the reader is intended to conclude, with Evans, that—since there clearly are, in fact, meaningful vague identities (Note: E.g., "Princeton = Princeton Borough": the referent of "Princeton" is indeterminate—perhaps it denotes the Borough only, perhaps the Township and Borough together—and so the proposition is difficult to evaluate as either plainly true or plainly false.)—any purported proof to the contrary cannot be right; and as the proof relies upon the premise that vague terms precisely denote vague objects, but fails under the view that vague terms reflect a merely semantic indeterminacy, it follows that vagueness cannot be a property of objects themselves.

Still, some philosophers are willing to defend ontological vagueness—by, for instance, proposing alternative deduction rules involving Leibniz's law—as some kind of metaphysical phenomenon; advocates of this approach have included Peter van Inwagen, Trenton Merricks, and Terence Parsons. Others, such as Richard Heck, defend vague objects as (at least) logically coherent—contra Evans—by "biting the bullet" and accepting that identity-statements involving vague objects are unsatisfiable, while denying that this therefore means that the same objects admit of any definite identity-statement.

== Legal principle ==
In the common law system, vagueness is a possible legal defence against by-laws and other regulations. The legal principle is that delegated power cannot be used more broadly than the delegator intended. Therefore, a regulation may not be so vague as to regulate areas beyond what the law allows. Any such regulation would be "void for vagueness" and unenforceable. This principle is sometimes used to strike down municipal by-laws that forbid "explicit" or "objectionable" contents from being sold in a certain city; courts often find such expressions to be too vague, giving municipal inspectors discretion beyond what the law allows. In the US this is known as the vagueness doctrine and in Europe as the principle of legal certainty.

== See also ==
- Essentially contested concept
- Fuzzy concept
- Imprecise language
- Obfuscation
- Relevance
- Unconstitutional vagueness
- Understanding
