= Lisa Bortolotti =

Italian-born British philosopher

- Born: 1974 (age 51–52); Bologna, Italy
- Awards: American Philosophical Association book prize

Education
- Education: Laurea University of Bologna, MA in Philosophy King's College London, BPhil University of Oxford, PhD Australian National University, PGCHE University of Manchester

Philosophical work
- Institutions: University of Birmingham and University of Ferrara
- Main interests: Philosophy of psychiatry Philosophy of psychology Bioethics
- Notable works: Delusions and Other Irrational Beliefs
- Website: sites.google.com/view/lisabortolotti

Lisa Bortolotti (born 1974 in Bologna) is an Italian philosopher who is currently professor of philosophy in the Department of Philosophy at the University of Birmingham, United Kingdom, and in the Department of Neuroscience and Rehabilitation at the University of Ferrara, Italy. Her work is in the philosophy of the cognitive sciences, including philosophy of psychology and philosophy of psychiatry, as well as bioethics and medical ethics. She was educated at the University of Bologna, King's College London, University of Oxford and the Australian National University, and worked briefly at the University of Manchester before beginning at Birmingham, where she has been a lecturer, senior lecturer, reader and now professor.

She has published five sole-authored books: An Introduction to the Philosophy of Science (Polity Press, 2008); Delusions and Other Irrational Beliefs (Oxford University Press, 2009); Irrationality (Polity, 2014); The Epistemic Innocence of Irrational Beliefs (Oxford University Press, 2020); and Why Delusions Matter (Bloomsbury Academic, 2023). Delusions and Other Irrational Beliefs, in which Bortolotti challenges the argument that delusions cannot be beliefs due to their irrationality, was the winner of the 2011 American Philosophical Association book prize. In addition, she edited Philosophy and Happiness (Palgrave Macmillan, 2009), Delusions in Context (Palgrave Macmillan, 2018), and Epistemic Justice in Mental Healthcare (Palgrave Macmillan, 2025) and co-edited Psychiatry as Cognitive Neuroscience: Philosophical Perspectives (Oxford University Press, 2009) with psychiatrist Matthew R. Broome.

== Education ==
Bortolotti studied philosophy at the University of Bologna, spending several months as an Erasmus studet at the University of Leeds and graduating in 1997. Her undergraduate dissertation, supervised by Eva Picardi, was on conceptual relativism. In 1998, she graduated with an MA in philosophy from King's College London. Here, she wrote on Scientific Revolutions under Donald Gillies. Next, she moved to the University of Oxford, where she read for a BPhil. Her thesis, supervised by Bill Newton-Smith, was on "the rationality debate in philosophy and the cognitive sciences". Bortolotti read for her PhD at the Australian National University. Her doctoral thesis, which was supervised by Martin Davies, challenged Donald Davidson's account of belief ascription. She completed her PhD in 2004.

== Career ==
The ebook version of Bortolotti's 2018 edited collection Delusions in Context

Bortolotti worked as a research associate at the University of Manchester from 2004 to 2005. She worked as part of the Centre for Social Ethics and Policy (where she was also an honorary lecturer) under John Harris on a project exploring the nature of research, also covering research ethics and law. She became a part of the Department of Philosophy at the University of Birmingham in 2005, as a lecturer. In 2007, she took up a visiting professorship at the European School of Molecular Medicine, Milan, which she held until 2008; in that same year, she spent several months at the Macquarie Centre for Cognitive Science, Macquarie University on a research fellowship and was promoted to senior lecturer at the University of Birmingham. 2008 was also the year of publication of her first book, which was a textbook entitled An Introduction to the Philosophy of Science, published by Polity. A Portuguese version was published in 2013.

Bortolotti published three books in 2009. She edited Philosophy and Happiness, a collection released by Palgrave Macmillan, and co-edited, with Matthew R. Broome, Psychiatry as Cognitive Neuroscience: Philosophical Perspectives. The former book arose from a 2007 conference at Birmingham entitled Happiness and the Meaning of Life. It featured 14 chapters, split into two sections: "Happiness and the Meaningful Life" and "Happiness and the Mind". The latter book was published by Oxford University Press, and contained essays by a range of academics, broadly addressing the status of psychiatry as a science. It was widely reviewed, and was listed as one 2009's "books of the year" in The Guardian, with Mary Warnock saying that "[d]espite its title, it's a gripping read".

Bortolotti's third book in 2009 was Delusions and Other Irrational Beliefs, a monograph exploring delusions and requirements for the ascription of beliefs. The book was highly successful, being awarded the American Philosophical Association's 2011 book prize. Granted in recognition of the "best ... book published by a younger scholar in the previous two years", the prize is awarded every two years and carries with it a US$4000 award. The book was reviewed in a number of publications, and was the subject of a special issue in the journal Neuroethics. The issue, edited by Neil Levy, contained five articles engaging with the book. These were by: Jakob Hohwy and Vivek Rajan; Eric Schwitzgebel; Dominic Murphy; Keith Frankish; and Maura Tumulty. In addition, Bortolotti contributed a précis of the book and an article in defence of some of her claims.

In 2011, she became a reader at Birmingham, and then, in 2013, a professor. In 2014, she published Irrationality as part of Polity's Key Concepts in Philosophy series, and was the editor of 2018's Delusions in Context, an open access collection published by Palgrave Macmillan. In 2020, she published The Epistemic Innocence of Irrational Beliefs with Oxford University Press, and in 2023 she published Why Delusions Matter with Bloomsbury Academic. Her open access edited collection Epistemic Justice in Mental Healthcare was published in 2024.

== Research ==
External audio
- "Are delusions that irrational?" Podcast featuring Bortolotti discussing Delusions and Other Irrational Beliefs with Rajendra Persaud
- "Lisa Bortolotti on Irrationality"; Bortolotti speaking on the Philosophy Bites podcast.

In Delusions and Other Irrational Beliefs, Bortolotti challenges the idea that delusions are not beliefs given that they are irrational. While held to be beliefs in the medical literature, the status of delusions is disputed by philosophers, who have denied that delusions are beliefs on account of their deeply unusual content—such as the delusion that one is actually dead—and because they work differently from paradigmatic beliefs. For example, delusions are often maintained despite overwhelming counter-evidence, or are not reacted to in the way one would expect given their content.

After setting out the background to the question, Bortolotti explores whether the procedural irrationality of delusions—the fact that they do not rationally relate to the other intentional states of the agent—justifies the denial that they are beliefs. She denies that it does, given that many paradigm beliefs display failures of procedural rationality. She then moves on to the epistemic irrationality of delusions, i.e., the fact that they are not supported by evidence. This can also not be used to challenge the status of delusions as beliefs, she argues, as many widespread ordinary beliefs are also epistemically irrational. She next addresses the idea that delusions are not beliefs, as, first, they are not acted upon in the appropriate way, and, second, people with delusions cannot provide good reasons for holding the content of the delusion. Though allowing that these characterisations of people with delusions can be correct, she argues that these failures of so-called agential rationality can also be found in people who do not have delusions. Bortolotti holds that the status of thoughts which subjects do not endorse (such as inserted thoughts) as beliefs is in question, but that beliefs that are both endorsed and self-ascribed contribute to one's conception of self as part of a self-narrative.

She concludes her book by rejecting the rationality constraint on belief ascription. She challenges the idealisation of beliefs, but endorses the goal of separating beliefs and other intentional states. She argues that the difference between delusional and normal beliefs must concern more than their epistemic features. The difference between delusions and irrational (but non-delusional) beliefs is, she claims, one of degree, and not one of kind.

== Select bibliography ==
In addition to her books, Bortolotti has published over 90 articles in peer-reviewed journals and 35 chapters in edited collections. She is a series editor for Oxford's International Perspectives in Philosophy & Psychiatry series and on the editorial board of Bloomsbury's Science, Ethics & Innovation series. She is the Editor in Chief of Philosophical Psychology and serves on the editorial board of a number of journals, as well as acting as the review editor for Frontiers in Theoretical and Philosophical Psychology, associate editor for Ethical Theory and Moral Practice and e-letter's editor for the Journal of Medical Ethics. She has guest-edited or co-guest-edited several journal special issues, including issues of the European Journal of Analytic Philosophy, the Journal of Consciousness Studies, and Consciousness and Cognition.

=== Books ===
- Bortolotti, Lisa (2009). Delusions and Other Irrational Beliefs. Oxford: Oxford University Press.
- Bortolotti, Lisa (2014). Irrationality. Cambridge: Polity. (Also available in Japanese.)
- Bortolotti, Lisa (2020). The Epistemic Innocence of Irrational Beliefs. Oxford: Oxford University Press.
- Bortolotti, Lisa (2023). Why Delusions Matter. London: Bloomsbury Academic.

=== Textbooks ===
- Bortolotti, Lisa (2008). An Introduction to the Philosophy of Science. Cambridge: Polity. (Also available in Portuguese and Persian.)
- Miyazono, Kengo and Lisa Bortolotti (2021). Philosophy of Psychology: an Introduction. Cambridge: Polity.

=== Edited collections ===
- Botolotti, Lisa, ed. (2009). Philosophy and Happiness. Basingstoke: Palgrave Macmillan.
- Broome, Matthew R., and Lisa Bortolotti (2009). Psychiatry as Cognitive Neuroscience: Philosophical Perspectives. Oxford: Oxford University Press.
- Bortolotti, Lisa, ed. (2018). Delusions in Context. Basingstoke, United Kingdom: Palgrave Macmillan.
- Bortolotti, Lisa, ed. (2024). Epistemic Justice in Mental Healthcare: Recognising Agency and Promoting Virtues Across the Life Span. Basingstoke, United Kingdom: Palgrave Macmillan.
