= Hanna Pickard =

Canadian philosopher (born 1972)

- Born: August 18, 1972 (age 54); Kingston, Ontario
- Spouse: Ian Phillips

Academic background
- Education: Queen's University (BA, 1995); Magdalen College, Oxford (BPhil, 1997); All Souls College, Oxford (DPhil, 2001)

Academic work
- Discipline: Philosopher
- Sub-discipline: Philosophy of mind; philosophy of psychiatry; moral psychology; medical ethics
- Institutions: Johns Hopkins University
- Website: https://www.hannapickard.com/

Hanna Pickard (born August 18, 1972) is a Canadian philosopher who specializes in the philosophy of mind, philosophy of psychiatry, moral psychology, and medical ethics. She is a Bloomberg Distinguished Professor of Philosophy and Bioethics at Johns Hopkins University with appointments in the William H. Miller III Department of Philosophy in the Zanvyl Krieger School of Arts and Sciences and the Berman Institute of Bioethics.

== Early life and education ==
Pickard is from Kingston, Ontario. Pickard's parents, Toni and Michael Pickard, were both professors of law at Queen's University.

Pickard completed a B.A. in philosophy at Queen's University in 1995. She then moved to the University of Oxford, where she earned a BPhil in philosophy at Magdalen College, Oxford and a DPhil at All Souls College, Oxford, where she was elected to a Prize Fellowship in 1997.

== Career ==
From 2007 until 2017, Pickard worked part-time as an assistant team therapist at the Oxford Complex Needs Service of the National Health Service, a specialist service for people with personality disorders within the Oxford Health NHS Trust. During this period, she also held a Fifty-Pound Fellowship at All Souls College. In addition, from 2010 until 2015, Pickard was a Wellcome Trust Biomedical Ethics Clinical Research Fellow at the Oxford Centre for Neuroethics, University of Oxford. Pickard was a reader in philosophy at the University of Birmingham from 2015 until 2017, and held a chair in philosophy of psychology there from 2017 until 2019. From 2017 until 2019, Pickard was also a visiting research scholar to the Program in Cognitive Science at Princeton University. In 2019, she joined Johns Hopkins University as the 45th Bloomberg Distinguished Professor, cross-appointed to the William H. Miller III Department of Philosophy in the Zanvyl Krieger School of Arts and Sciences and the Berman Institute of Bioethics with a secondary appointment to the Department of Psychological and Brain Sciences.

== Research ==
Pickard is a philosopher who specializes in the philosophy of mind, philosophy of psychiatry, moral psychology, and medical ethics. Inspired by her clinical experience, Pickard's work explores philosophical questions that arise out of real-world issues, especially clinical practice and related science, and spans a wide range of topics, including the nature of mental disorders, delusions, agency, character, emotions, self-harm, violence, placebos, therapeutic relationships, decision-making capacity, the self and social identity, and attitudes towards mental disorder and crime.

=== Addiction ===
One of Pickard's primary research focuses is addiction. In contrast to two prevailing models of addiction, the moral model of addiction and the disease model of addiction, Pickard has developed a value-based framework for drug choice in substance use disorders that recognizes the many functions drugs serve and integrates a heterogeneous range of factors that influence addicted decision-making in addition to craving, including: psychiatric co-morbidity, limited socio-economic opportunities, decision-making biases, denial and motivated irrationality, and a sense of self and social identity.

=== Responsibility Without Blame ===
Another, yet strongly related, central research project is the ethical framework Pickard developed out of her experiences with the Oxfordshire Complex Needs Service and her research on addiction, titled “Responsibility without Blame," which focuses on the ways in which society responds to behaviors such as crime and addiction. The framework separates the ideas of agency and responsibility from moral condemnation and blame, and emphasizes holding individuals accountable for harmful behavior without blaming them. Pickard has also developed an open access e-learning toolkit that teaches learners how to use this framework in practice.

Pickard has also written extensively in collaboration with Nicola Lacey on the application of the Responsibility without Blame framework in criminal justice theory and practice.

== Personal life ==
Pickard is married to fellow Bloomberg Distinguished Professor Ian Phillips. The two met when they were both fellows at All Souls College, Oxford.
