= Faculty of Philosophy, University of Oxford =

Department of the University of Oxford, England

The Faculty of Philosophy is an academic department of the Humanities Division at the University of Oxford in Oxford, England, United Kingdom.

It was founded in 2001. The faculty is located next to Somerville College on Woodstock Road. As of 2021, it is ranked 1st in the UK and 2nd in the English-speaking world by the Philosophical Gourmet Report, as well as 4th in the world by the QS World University Rankings. It is additionally ranked first in the UK by the Complete University Guide, the Guardian, the Times, and the Independent.

== History of the Faculty of Philosophy at Oxford ==
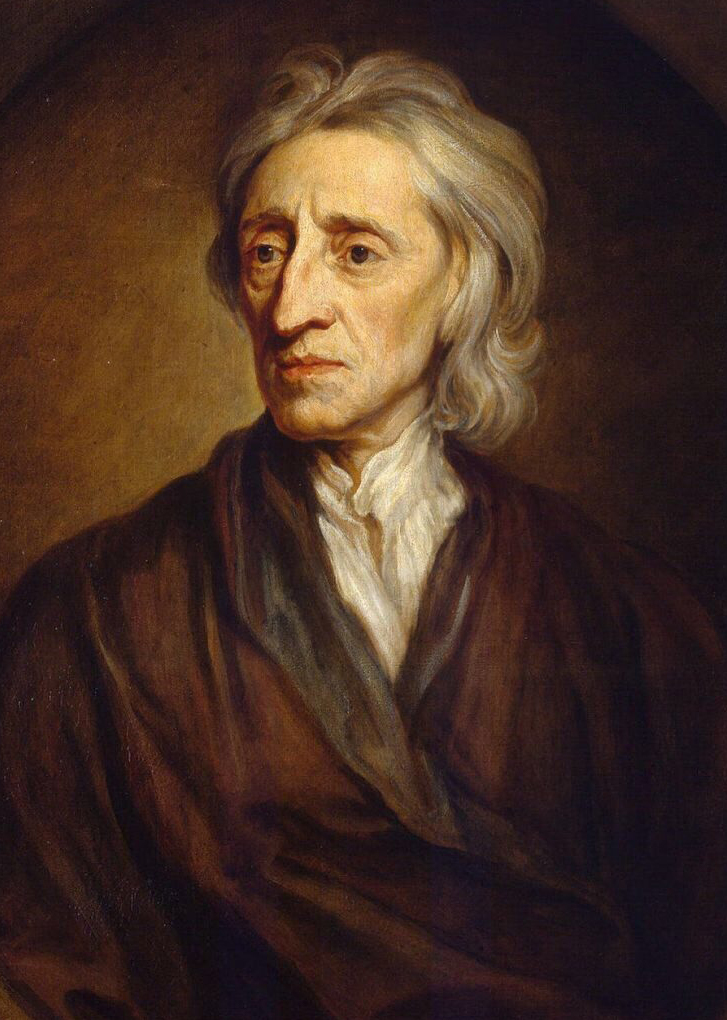
John Locke

The present-day Faculty was formerly a sub-faculty of the Faculty of Literae Humaniores (founded in 1913), though the teaching of philosophy at Oxford dates back to medieval times. The Faculty boasts over 50 full-time philosophers in permanent posts, with at least another 50 fixed-term, emeritus and associate members. Today, it is housed within Oxford's Humanities Division.

Some of the world's most prominent philosophers have studied (and taught) at Oxford, including Duns Scotus, Thomas Bradwardine, Robert Grosseteste, William of Ockham, John Wycliffe, Thomas Hobbes, John Locke, John Norris, Jeremy Bentham, Henry Longueville Mansel, Thomas Hill Green, F. H. Bradley, Edward Caird, and in more recent times Elizabeth Anscombe, J. L. Austin, A. J. Ayer, Isaiah Berlin, Michael Dummett, Philippa Foot, Celia Green, Genevieve Lloyd, Mary Midgley, Iris Murdoch, Thomas Nagel, Onora O'Neill, Derek Parfit, Gilbert Ryle, Michael A. Smith, Paul Snowdon, Galen Strawson, Peter Strawson, and Bernard Williams.

Such eminent philosophers as Noam Chomsky, Daniel Dennett, Christine Korsgaard, Saul Kripke, Hilary Putnam, Wilfrid Sellars, Amartya Sen, and many others have come to Oxford to deliver the John Locke Lectures, the Gareth Evans Memorial Lectures and other established lectures and lecture series.

The Faculty has the following statutory professorships in philosophy:

- The White's Professorship of Moral Philosophy (founded in 1621)
- The Waynflete Professorship of Metaphysical Philosophy (founded in 1859)
- The Wykeham Professorship of Logic (founded in 1859)
- The Nolloth Professorship of the Philosophy of the Christian Religion (founded in 1920)
- The Professorship of Ancient Philosophy (founded in 1966)
- The Wilde Professorship of Mental Philosophy (founded in 2000); formerly the Wilde Readership in Mental Philosophy (founded in 1898)
- The Uehiro Professorship of Practical Ethics (founded in 2003).

== Henry Wilde Prize and Other Endowments ==
The Henry Wilde Prize in Philosophy is awarded annually for an outstanding performance in Philosophy and he endowed many learned institutions including in 1895 the Manchester Literary & Philosophical Society.

== Research centres ==
=== Future of Humanity Institute ===
The Future of Humanity Institute (FHI) was founded by Nick Bostrom in 2005 to "assess how dangerous AI and other potential threats might be to the human species". It was closed down on 16 April 2024, having "faced increasing administrative headwinds within the Faculty of Philosophy". The Institute's final report described a "gradual suffocation by Faculty bureaucracy", noting that "[t]he flexible, fast-moving approach of the institute did not function well with the rigid rules and slow decision-making of the surrounding organization". In May 2024, the independent Oxford student newspaper, Cherwell, described shuttering of FHI with the headline "Institute accused of ‘eugenics on steroids’ shut down by Oxford University".

=== Global Priorities Institute ===
The Global Priorities Institute was founded in 2018, to investigate the question of "how to do the most good". The institute closed in July 2025.

== Notable current members ==
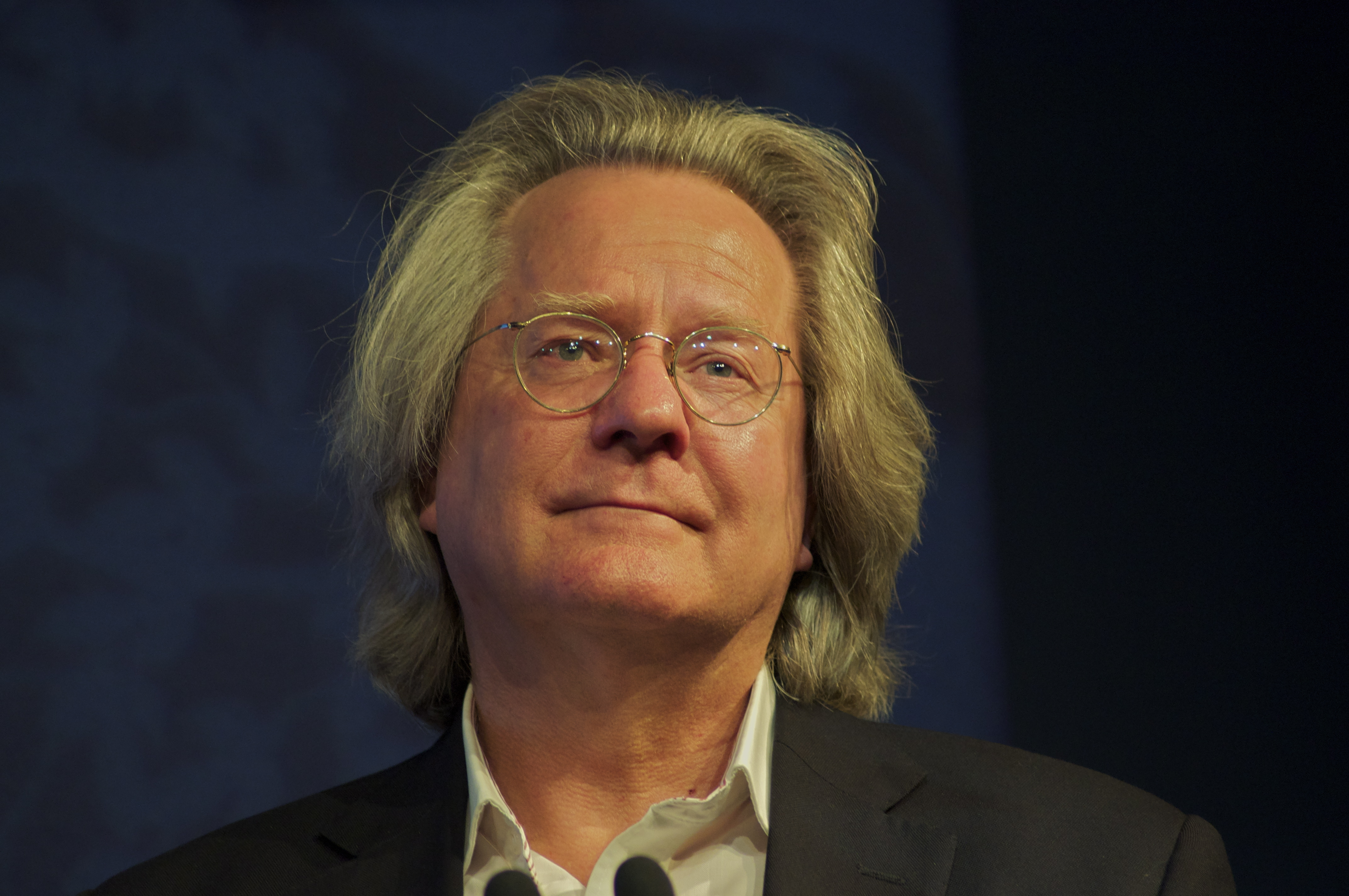
A. C. Grayling

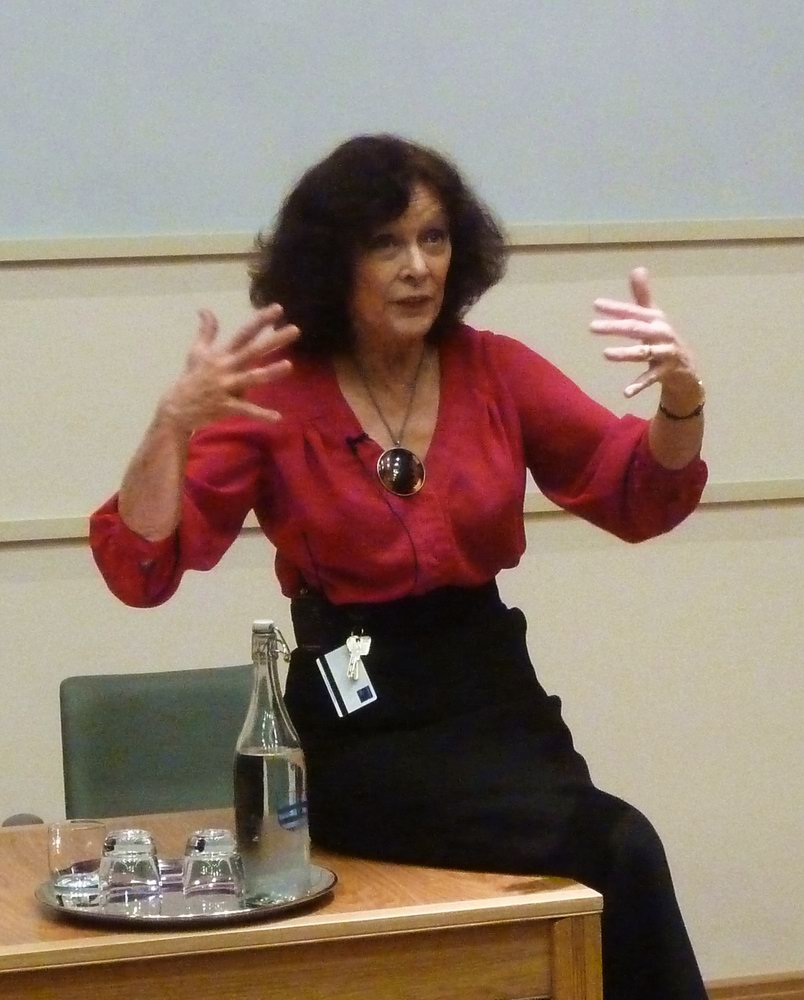
Janet Radcliffe Richards

- John Broome
- Harvey Brown
- Roger Crisp
- A. C. Grayling
- Terence Irwin
- Brian Leftow
- A.W. Moore
- William MacAskill
- Jeff McMahan
- Stephen Mulhall
- Toby Ord
- Janet Radcliffe Richards
- Gonzalo Rodríguez Pereyra
- Julian Savulescu
- Richard Sorabji
- Ralph C. S. Walker
- Timothy Williamson
- Mark Wrathall

== Notable past members ==
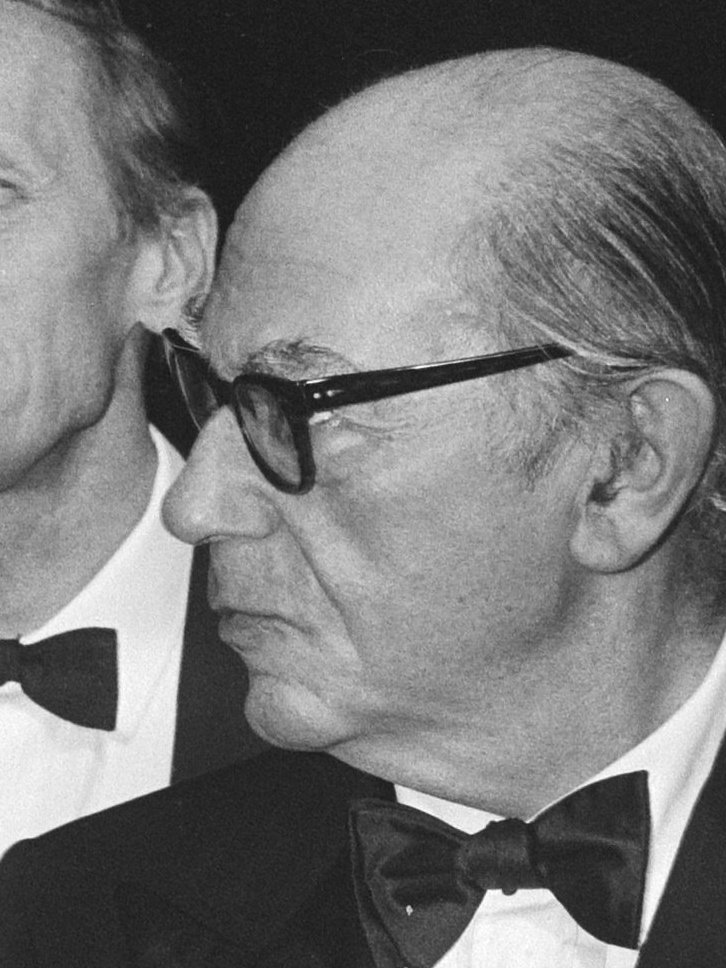
Isaiah Berlin

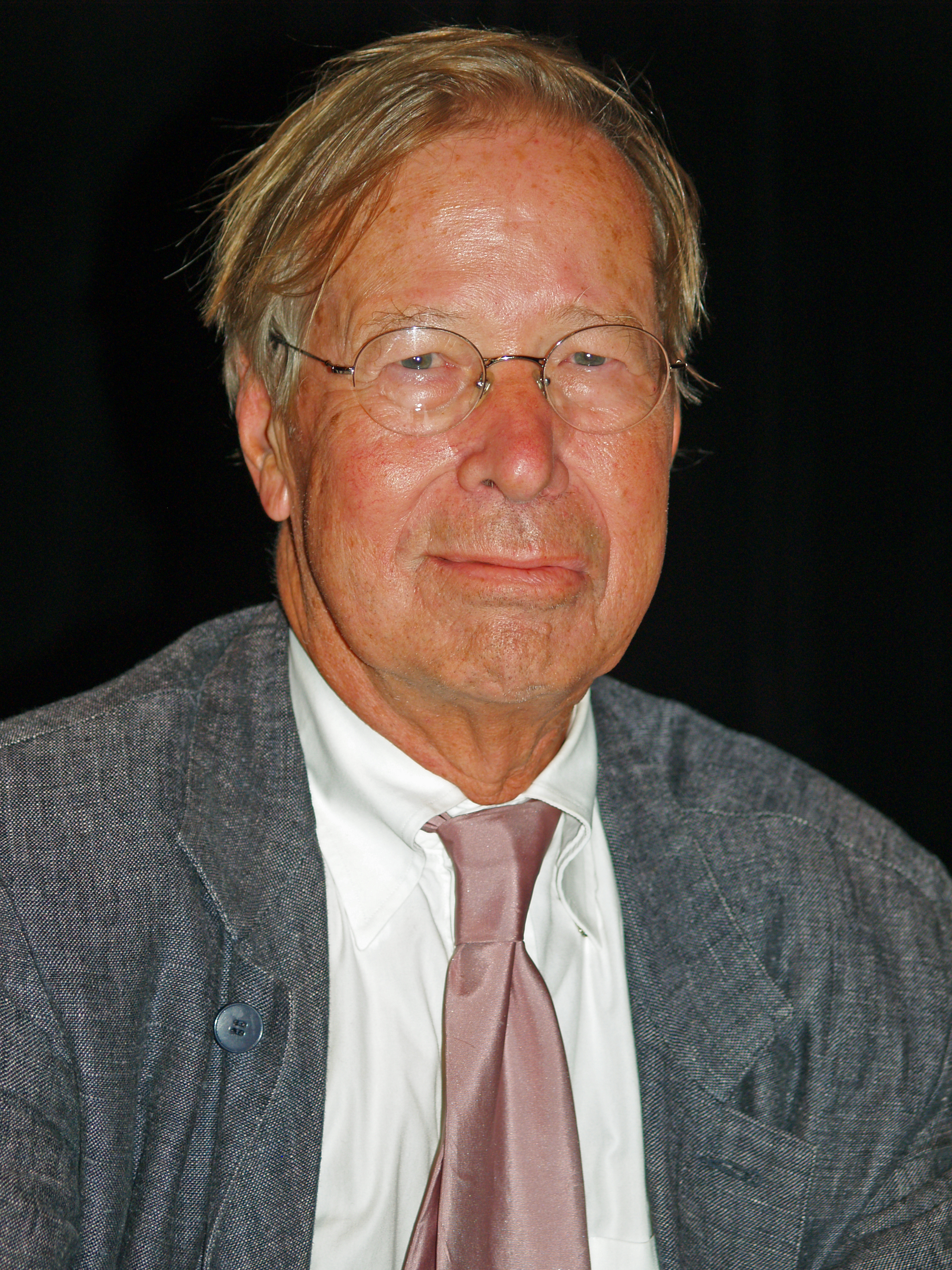
Ronald Dworkin

- Michael Ayers
- Isaiah Berlin
- Simon Blackburn
- Nick Bostrom
- David Charles
- Sir Michael Dummett
- Ronald Dworkin
- Philippa Foot
- Peter Geach
- John Hawthorne
- Stuart Hampshire
- R.M. Hare
- J.L. Mackie
- Iris Murdoch
- Christopher Peacocke
- W.D. Ross
- Amartya Sen
- Paul Snowdon
- Colin McGinn
- Derek Parfit
- Sir Geoffrey Warnock
- Mary Warnock, Baroness Warnock
- David Wiggins
- Bernard Williams
- Sybil Wolfram
