= Ian Phillips (philosopher) =

British philosopher

Ian B. Phillips
- Born: 25 October 1980 (age 45); London, England
- Spouse: Hanna Pickard

Academic background
- Education: Magdalen College, Oxford (BA, MA, 2003, BPhil, 2005); University College London (PhD, 2009)

Academic work
- Discipline: Philosopher
- Sub-discipline: Philosophy of mind; philosophy of perception; Philosophy of cognitive science
- Institutions: Johns Hopkins University
- Website: https://www.ianbphillips.com/

Ian B. Phillips is a British philosopher and Bloomberg Distinguished Professor of Philosophy and Psychological and Brain Sciences at the Johns Hopkins University, where he has taught since 2019. He has appointments in the William H. Miller III Department of Philosophy and the Department of Psychological and Brain Sciences in the Zanvyl Krieger School of Arts and Sciences. He is known for his works on the intersection of philosophy and brain science.

== Early life and education ==
Ian Phillips was born in London on 25 October 1980 to Amanda and Sir Jonathan Phillips, a retired British civil servant who served as warden of Keble College, Oxford, from 2010 to 2022. He has one brother, a journalist in Latin America.

Phillips studied at Magdalen College, Oxford, from 1999 to 2005, earning BA, MA and BPhil degrees. He held an Examination Fellowship at All Souls College, Oxford, from 2005 to 2012. He then earned a PhD in philosophy from University College London in 2009. His primary PhD advisor was Michael G. F. Martin.

== Career ==
Phillips was a lecturer in philosophy at University College London from 2010 until 2013. He joined St. Anne's College, Oxford, in 2013 as an Associate Professor and Gabriele Taylor Fellow and was made full professor in 2017, a title of distinction awarded by the University of Oxford. He moved to the University of Birmingham as chair in philosophy of psychology in 2017. From 2017 until 2019, he also held an appointment as a visiting research fellow in cognitive science at Princeton University. In 2019, he joined Johns Hopkins University as a Bloomberg Distinguished Professor, with joint appointments in the William H. Miller III Department of Philosophy and the Department of Psychological and Brain Sciences in the Zanvyl Krieger School of Arts and Sciences. He is a core member of the Foundations of Mind Group at Johns Hopkins University, which connects researchers across the university who are interested in philosophical, theoretical, and methodological questions about the mind-brain.

== Research ==
Phillips is a philosopher interested in the intersections of cognitive science and the philosophy of mind. His research focuses on the nature of perception, its relations to memory, imagination, and belief, the scientific study of consciousness, and our experience of time. He has argued that the phenomenon of blindsight does not involve unconscious vision but instead is qualitatively degraded conscious vision.

He has written about the COVID-19 pandemic impacted memory and our experience of time.

He edited The Routledge Handbook of Philosophy of Temporal Experience (2017). He has served as editor of the academic journal Mind & Language and consulting editor of Timing & Time Perception. He is currently working on a book that studies the relationship between perception and consciousness, focusing on subjects whose perception can be difficult to measure, including infants, animals, and people who have experienced brain damage.

== Awards ==
2021 Lebowitz Prize

2017 Philip Leverhulme Prize

2013 Philosopher's Annual Selection

2011 William James Prize for Contributions to the Study of Consciousness

== Personal life ==
Phillips is married to Hanna Pickard, who is also a Bloomberg Distinguished Professor of Philosophy at the Johns Hopkins University. The two met when they were both fellows at All Souls College, Oxford.
