= Michael G. F. Martin =

British philosopher

Michael Martin
- Born: 1962 (age 63–64)
- Awards: Henry Wilde Prize in Philosophy (1985)

Education
- Education: University of Oxford (DPhil)
- Thesis: The context of experience (1992)
- Doctoral advisor: Paul Snowdon

Philosophical work
- Era: 21st-century philosophy
- Region: Western philosophy
- School: Analytic
- Institutions: University of Oxford
- Main interests: Philosophy of mind
- Notable ideas: Naïve realism

Michael Gerard Fitzgerald Martin (born 1962) is a British philosopher who is currently Wilde Professor of Mental Philosophy at the University of Oxford and Mills Adjunct Professor of Philosophy at UC Berkeley.

== Education and career ==
Martin studied at Oxford University where he won The Henry Wilde Prize in Philosophy in 1985 and earned his D.Phil. in 1992 under the supervision of Paul Snowdon. He joined the faculty at University College London in 1992, and was promoted to Professor of Philosophy there in 2002. He became Wilde Professor of Mental Philosophy in 2018, succeeding Martin Davies, who retired.

== Philosophical work ==
Martin works in philosophy of mind, specifically perception. He defends "naive realism", "the view that perception constitutively involves relations of awareness of the ordinary, mind-independent world around us."
