= Jennifer Dawson =

English novelist

- Born: 24 January 1929; London, U.K.
- Died: 14 October 2000 (age 71); Charlbury, U.K.
- Other name: Jennifer Hinton
- Occupation: Writer
- Spouse: Michael Hinton

Jennifer Dawson (23 January 1929 – 14 October 2000) was an English novelist. Her works explored the theme of mental illness and society's attitudes to those suffering from such conditions. She won the James Tait Black Memorial Prize for her first novel, The Ha-Ha (1961), and the Cheltenham Festival Award for her second novel, Fowler's Snare (1962).

== Early life and education ==
Dawson was born in London, the daughter of a journalist mother and a travel agent father. She attended the Mary Datchelor School in Camberwell and went on to read Modern History at St Anne's College, Oxford. During her time at Oxford she studied with Iris Murdoch. Also at Oxford, she suffered a breakdown and spent several months in Warneford Hospital, Oxford.

== Career ==
Following the completion of her studies, Dawson worked as a teacher at a convent in Laval in France, and later at Oxford University Press where she made editorial contributions to a number of reference works. In addition to these roles, she also worked as social worker in a psychiatric hospital in Worcester and it was her experiences here, and as a patient of such an institution, that formed the basis for her debut novel The Ha-Ha (1961). The novel, which explores schizophrenia, received considerable critical acclaim, and was awarded the James Tait Black Memorial Prize. It was adapted for the London stage by Richard Eyre, and was later broadcast by the BBC on both radio and television.

Dawson continued to explore similar themes throughout the 1960s and 1970s via novels such as The Cold Country, Strawberry Boy and A Field of Scarlet Poppies. In the 1980s two further novels The Upstairs People and Judasland were released by the Virago Press. "Jennifer Dawson's prose is as jagged and angular as her tone on behalf of the marginalised—women, immigrants, the poor, the sick—is resenting and bitter," wrote Valentine Cunningham when reviewing Judasland in The Observer in 1989.

She worked on the Campaign for Nuclear Disarmament, and participated in the 1963 Aldermaston March.

== Awards and distinctions ==
- James Tait Black Memorial Prize (1961)
- Cheltenham Festival Award (1962)

== Works ==
- The Ha-Ha (1961)
- Fowler's Snare (1963)
- The Cold Country (1965)
- The Queen of Trent (1972)
- Strawberry Boy (1976)
- Hospital Wedding (1978).
- A Field of Scarlet Poppies (1979)
- The Upstairs People (1988)
- Judasland (1989)

== Personal life ==
Dawson married philosopher Michael Hinton in 1964. He died in February 2000, and she died in October 2000, at the age of 71, in a hospice in Charlbury.
