= Paul Snowdon =

British philosopher

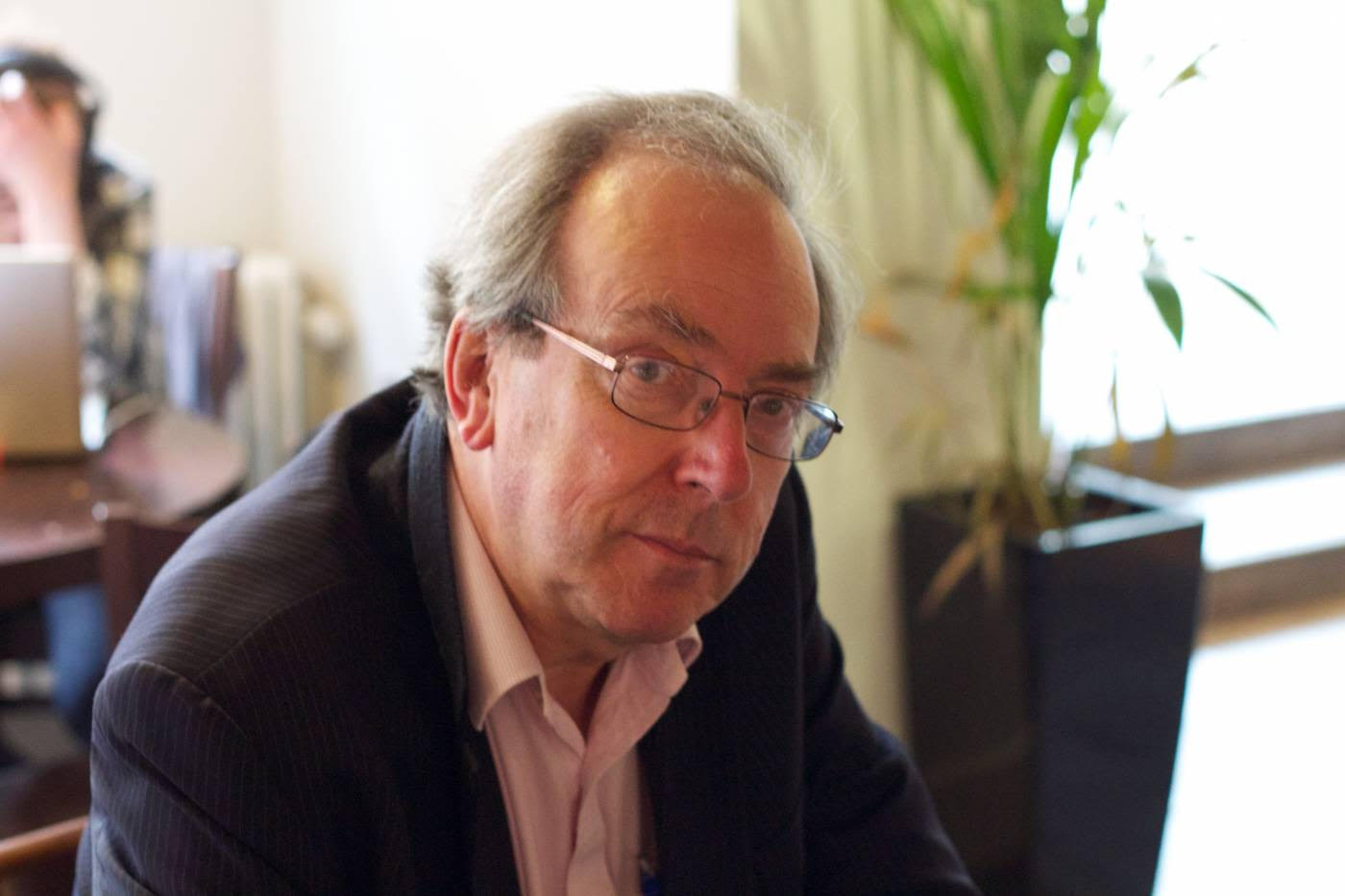
- Born: Paul F. Snowdon; 20 October 1946; Morley, West Yorkshire
- Died: 12 August 2022 (aged 75); London, England
- Spouse: Katherine Snowdon
- Children: 2

Education
- Education: University College, Oxford
- Academic advisor: P. F. Strawson

Philosophical work
- Era: Contemporary philosophy
- Region: Western philosophy
- School: Analytic
- Institutions: University of Oxford; Exeter College, Oxford; University College London
- Notable students: Michael G. F. Martin
- Notable ideas: Animalism; Disjunctivism

Paul F. Snowdon (20 October 1946 – 12 August 2022) was a British philosopher well known for his work on personal identity and perception. Snowdon published widely in philosophy of mind, metaphysics, and the history of 20th-century philosophy.

== Early life and education ==
Paul Francis Snowdon was born on 20 October 1946 in Morley, West Yorkshire. The birth took place in Morley Hall, a 17th-century stone mansion that functioned as the town's maternity hospital between 1917 and 1972. The son of a local vicar, he was raised in a religious household and attended Queen Elizabeth's Grammar School, Blackburn.

As a teenager, he became interested in questions concerning the existence of God and religious faith. Finding the traditional arguments for God's existence unconvincing, he grew puzzled by where to locate the source of moral value and turned to two recently published books by the Oxford philosopher, R. M. Hare, The Language of Morals (1952) and Freedom and Reason (1963). As Snowdon would later reminisce, this proved to be a fateful encounter:

Hare was a wonderful writer and thinker. But somehow or other I got from him the impression that Oxford was the centre of philosophy and that at the centre of that centre was P. F. Strawson. … So, in a way which I can't now understand, I decided I would apply to do philosophy at University College, Oxford, where Strawson was.

Snowdon spent the next five years at University College, Oxford, completing his BA (Philosophy, Politics, and Economics) in 1968 and his B.Phil (Philosophy) in 1970. Throughout this time, he was taught and supervised by Strawson.

There can have been no better introduction to, or training in, philosophy than to have had Strawson as a tutor.

Over the years, Snowdon would reflect in multiple settings on his appreciation of and respect for Strawson, as a tutor and as a philosopher, but also more generally as a writer and as a man. Indeed, it is no exaggeration to say that Strawson was both his greatest inspiration and biggest philosophical hero. The respect was mutual. Late in life, Strawson remarked that, along with philosopher Quassim Cassam, Snowdon was the best student he ever had.

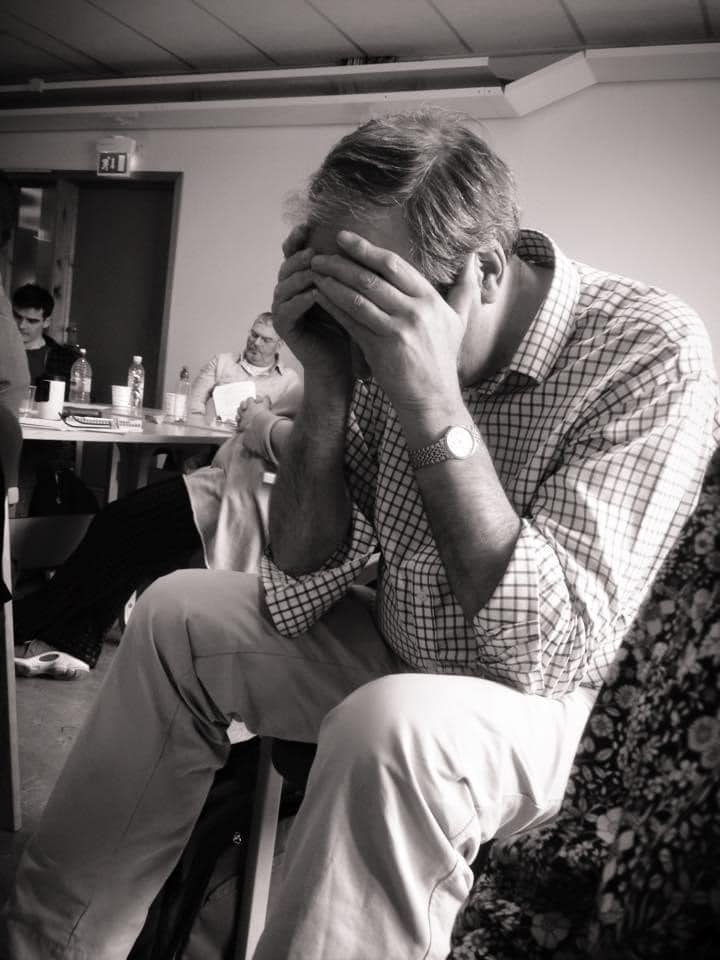
Snowdon in familiar contemplative pose

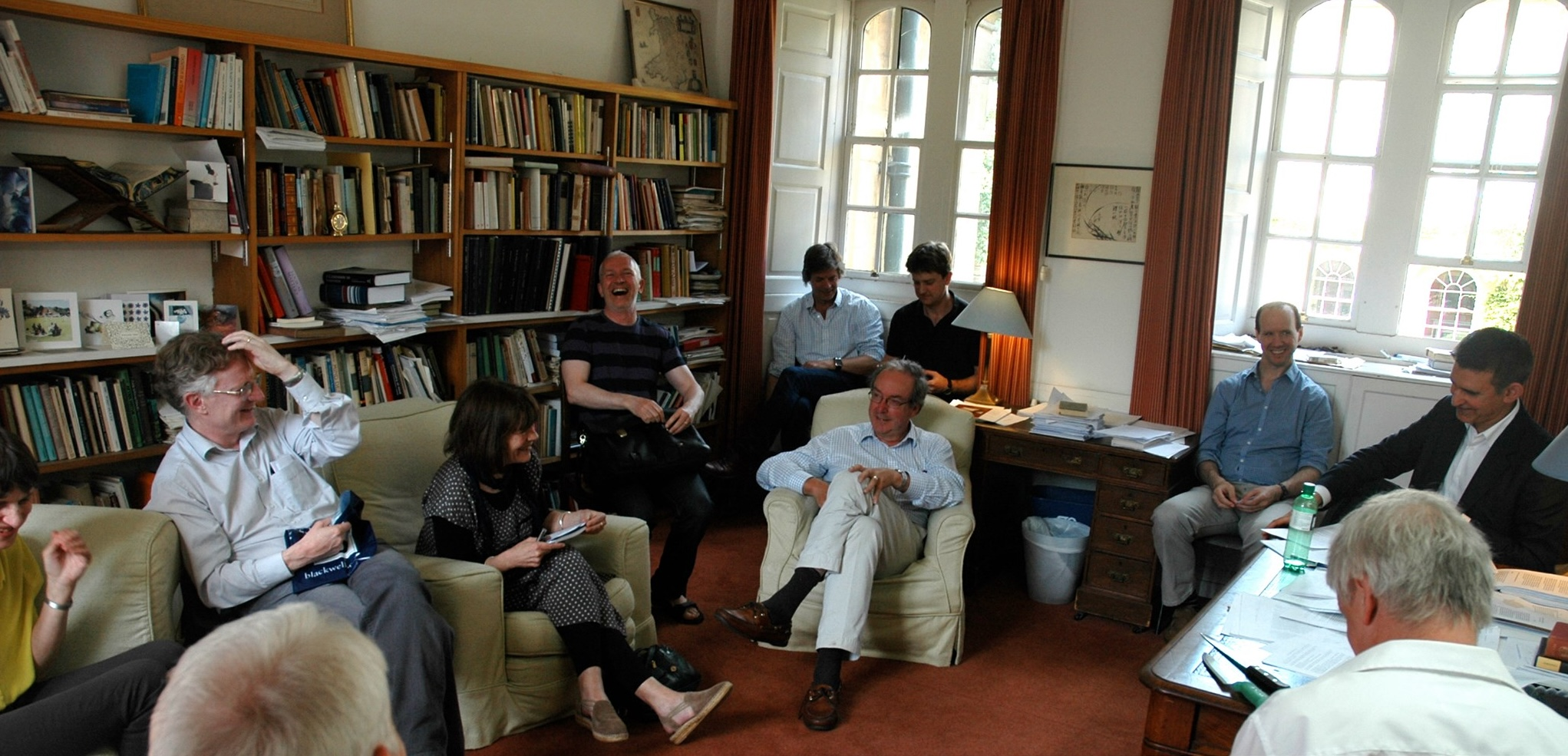
Known as "the Charles Group", this assembly of Oxford philosophers -- which met weekly in David Charles' room in Oriel College, Oxford -- included (among others) Bill Brewer, John Campbell, Quassim Cassam, David Charles, Naomi Eilan, Jennifer Hornsby, Mike Martin, Gonzalo Rodriguez-Pereyra, Oliver Pooley, Paul Snowdon, Rowland Stout, and Tim Williamson

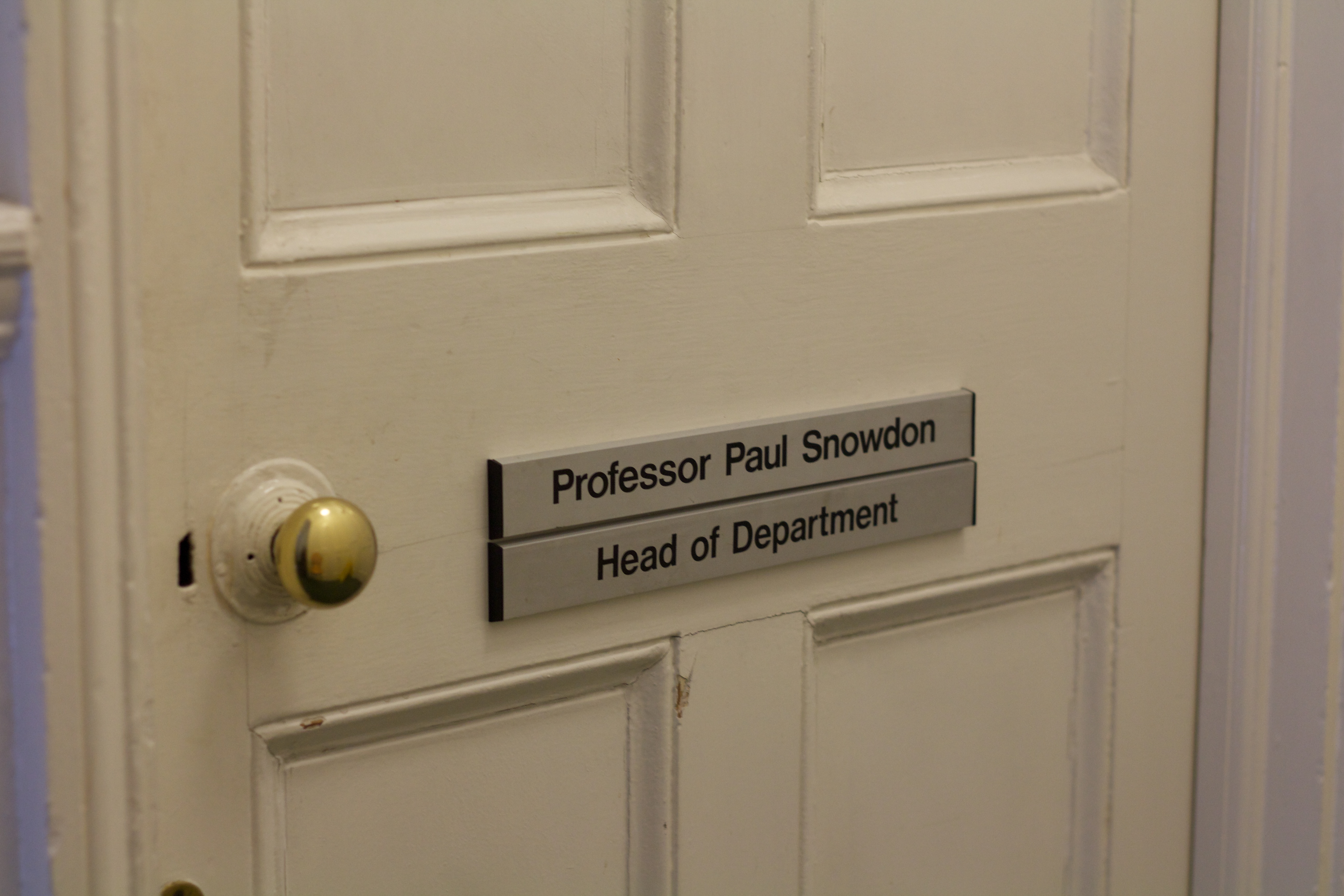
Snowdon's office door, University College London

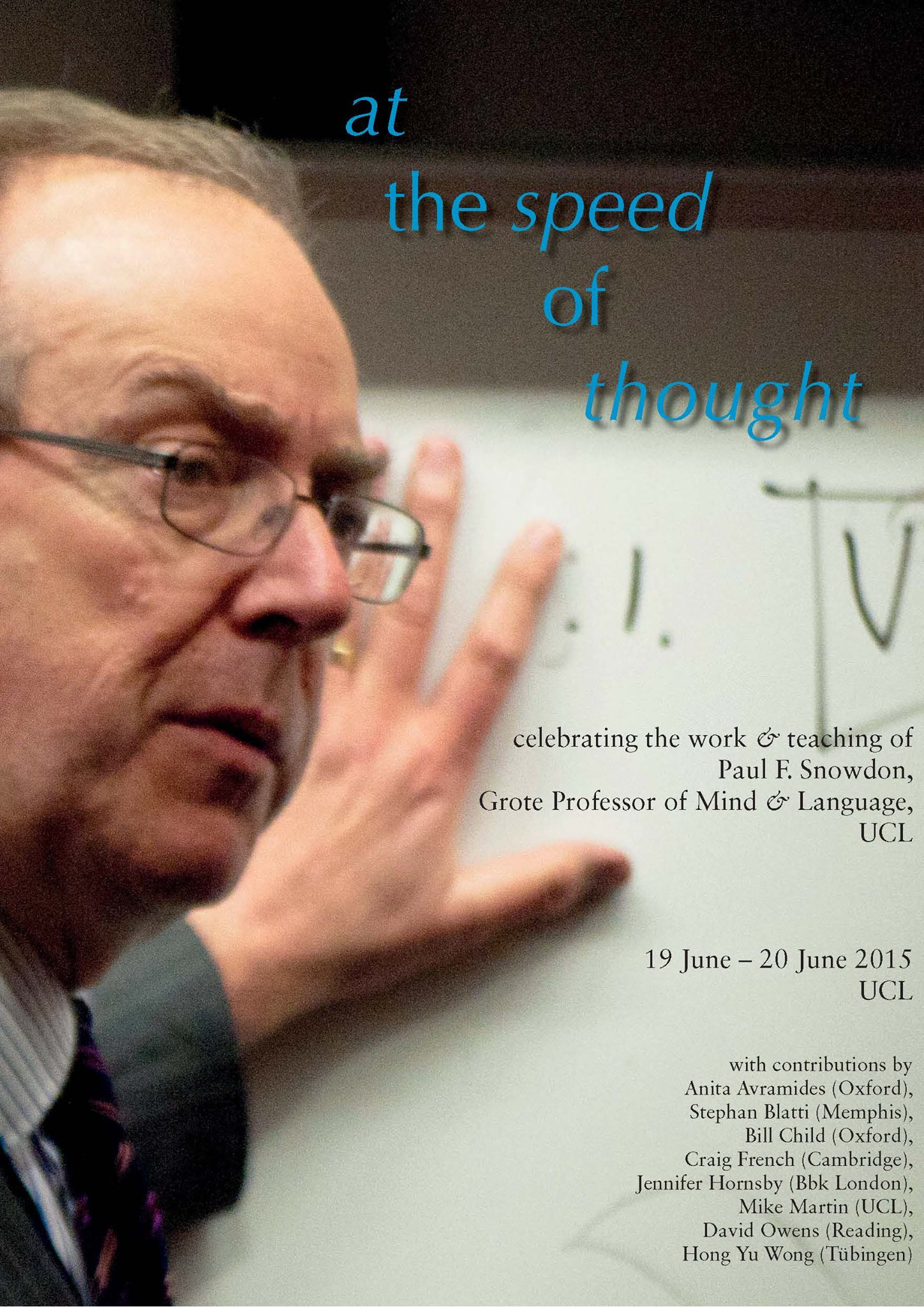
2015 conference celebrating the work and teaching of Paul F. Snowdon, Grote Professor of Mind & Language, University College London

== Career ==
After completing the B.Phil, Snowdon spent one year as a Lecturer in Philosophy at the University of Reading before returning to Oxford in 1971 as a Lecturer and Fellow at Exeter College. He was married to Katherine in 1979.

Though his first publication on the topic would not appear until 1981, Snowdon's primary area of interest during the 1970s was perception and perceptual experience. Here is how he describes his journey to the "disjunctive" theory of perception for which he would become known:

The dominant way of thinking about perception in Oxford at that time was more or less this: perception involves an external object causing an experience in a subject (in the right way), and the experience conveys to the subject information about the objective environment. Although at that time there was not much talk of the resulting inner experience having content, people such as Strawson did talk of the experiences being "saturated" by "objective concepts", which is an expression of a similar idea. Oddly, there was no great interest in identifying the different aspects of the inner experience, apart from the negative feature—agreed on by everyone except a few mavericks—that it did not involve sense-data. Practically everyone in that intellectual environment thought in that way, and, naturally, under the influence of that group I initially accepted that picture. However, in my case, encountering the writings of the maverick Oxford philosopher, Michael Hinton, which I did in the late 1960s when I was studying for the B.Phil., caused me, though after considerable resistance, to think that the philosophers holding such views had no very good philosophical reasons to accept them. The model they unhesitatingly accepted had, I came to think, the status of a dogma within a sealed-off intellectual tradition. In the 1970s, I tried to think my way into a better conception of perception and developed it in lectures in Oxford during that period. Having published, with feelings of trepidation, my first paper on it in the beginning of the 1980s, I was comforted to learn that John McDowell had been developing similar ideas, a fact I was unaware of until then.

After nearly three decades at Exeter College, Snowdon was appointed Grote Professor of the Philosophy of Mind and Logic at University College London in 2001. He served as President of the Aristotelian Society from 2003 to 2004 and held visiting appointments at numerous other institutions, including Williams College (USA), Umeå University (Sweden), and the University of Otago (New Zealand).

Snowdon's retirement from UCL in 2015 was marked by a two-day conference, At the Speed of Thought, celebrating his many contributions to philosophy. Organized by former student and then UCL colleague, Michael G. F. Martin (now Wilde Professor of Mental Philosophy at Oxford), the conference featured contributions from former students, colleagues, and friends, as well as comments from Snowdon himself.

After retirement, Snowdon was Emeritus Fellow at Exeter College, Oxford as well as Emeritus Grote Professor of Mind and Logic at University College London. He remained active and productive until his death at age 75 in 2022. Snowdon's amity and impactful work have been fondly remembered in a number of venues.

== Philosophical work ==
Despite his misgivings "about speaking in terms of an 'ism'", Snowdon became closely associated with no less than two such labels. In the philosophy of perception, he defended the view now known as "disjunctivism."

The highly general but simple thesis about perception that 'disjunctivism' stands for is that the nature of the experience you enjoy when you are perceiving your environment—say, seeing it—is a different sort of experience to the one you enjoy when you are hallucinating (or having other experiences that you might mistake for perceiving). Of course, virtually anyone would agree to that, but what needs tightening up is the notion of being a different sort of experience. The difference in nature or sort consists in the perceptual experience having the perceived object as a constituent (or a component), whereas the other type of experience (or types) do not have an external object as a constituent. It is committed to understanding the perceptual experience as not being some entity that is completely separate from the perceived object.

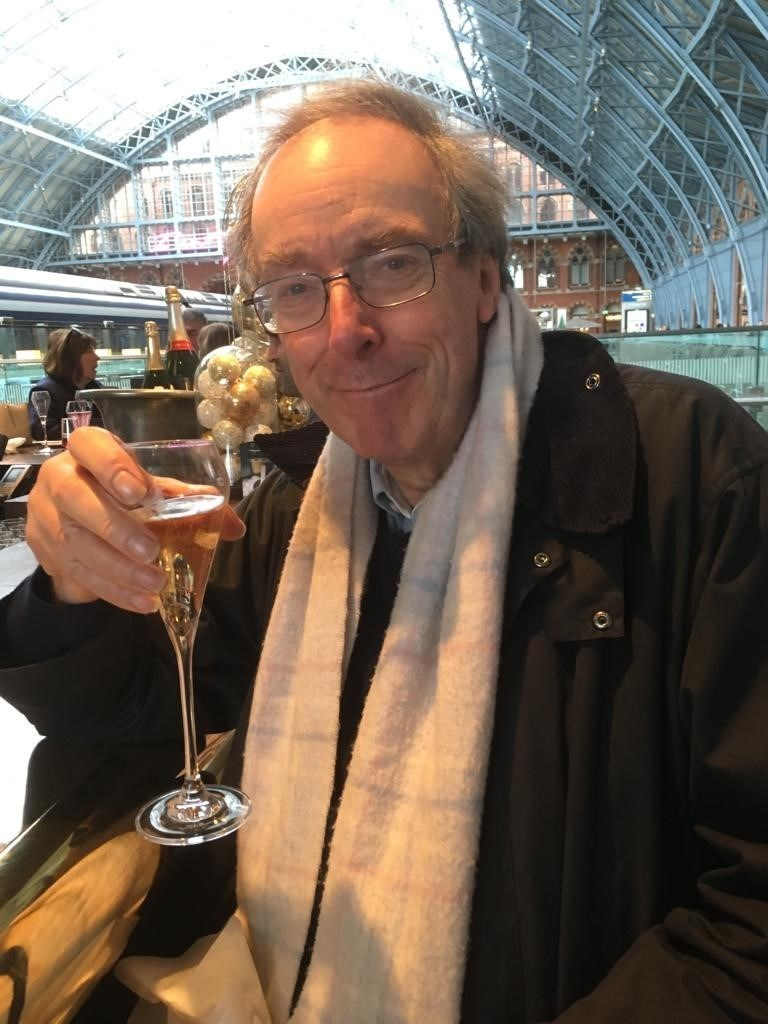
Paul Snowdon

Through the final publications that would appear only after his death in 2022, Snowdon devoted numerous scholarly essays and book chapters to exploring and refining the disjunctivist theory of perception that he first advanced in 1981. Many of these works are collected in his Essays on Perceptual Experience, published posthumously in 2024.

The second 'ism' for which Snowdon was equally well known was "animalism"—a term that he himself coined and a view that he first championed in a 1990 article. According to this theory of personal identity, "(e)ach of us is identical with, is one and the same thing as, an animal." The subject of Snowdon's only monograph, Persons, Animals, Ourselves (2014), animalism has sparked a large literature and has since become a catalyzing force in ongoing philosophical debates over the nature of the self and the identity of persons.

Snowdon's support for both disjunctivism and animalism stemmed in part from the ways that these views captured important, sometimes neglected dimensions of common sense. And in general, he held in high regard those thinkers who resisted the temptation to unmoor their views from good judgment.

== Selected publications ==
Books

- Essays on Perceptual Experience (edited by Stephan Blatti) (Oxford University Press, 2024).
- Animalism: New Essays on Animals, Persons, and Identity (co-edited with Stephan Blatti) (Oxford University Press, 2016).
- Persons, Animals, Ourselves (Oxford University Press, 2014).

Articles and book chapters

- "Perception, Vision and Causation", Proceedings of the Aristotelian Society 81 (1981): 175–92.
- "Persons, Animals, and Ourselves", in The Person and the Human Mind: Issues in Ancient and Modern Philosophy, ed. Christopher Gill (Oxford: Clarendon Press, 1990), 83–107.
- "How to Interpret 'Direct Perception'", in The Contents of Experience: Essays on Perception, ed. Tim Crane (Cambridge: Cambridge University Press, 1992), 48–78.
- "What is Realism?" Proceedings of the Aristotelian Society 102 (2002): 293–320.
- "Knowing How and Knowing That: A Distinction Reconsidered", Proceedings of the Aristotelian Society 104 (2004): 1–29.
- "On the What-It-Is-Like-ness of Experience", The Southern Journal of Philosophy 48, no. 1 (2010): 8–27.
- "Private Experience and Sense-Data", in The Oxford Handbook of Wittgenstein, ed. Oskari Kuusela and Marie McGinn (Oxford: Oxford University Press, 2011), 402–28.
- "Sport and Life", Royal Institute of Philosophy Supplement 73 (2013): 79–98.
- "Philosophy and the Mind/Body Problem", Royal Institute of Philosophy Supplement 76 (2015): 21–37.
- "The Lesson of Kant's Paralogisms", in Kant and the Philosophy of Mind: Perception, Reason, and the Self, ed. Anil Gomes and Andrew Stephenson (Oxford: Oxford University Press, 2017), 245–62.
- "Wittgenstein on Rule Following; Some Themes and Some Reactions", in Mind, Language, and Morality: Essays in Honor of Mark Platts, ed. Gustavo Ortiz–Millán and Juan Antonio Cruz Parcero (London: Routledge, 2018), 97–114.
- "The Nature of Persons and the Nature of Animals", in Biological Identity: Perspectives from Metaphysics and the Philosophy of Biology, ed. Anne Sophie Meincke and John Dupré (London: Routledge, 2022), 233–50.
- "Strawson's Basic Particulars", in P. F. Strawson and his Philosophical Legacy, ed. Sybren Heyndels, Audun Bengtson, and Benjamin De Mesel (Oxford: Oxford University Press, 2024), 59–78.
