= John Campbell (philosopher) =

Scottish philosopher (born 1956)

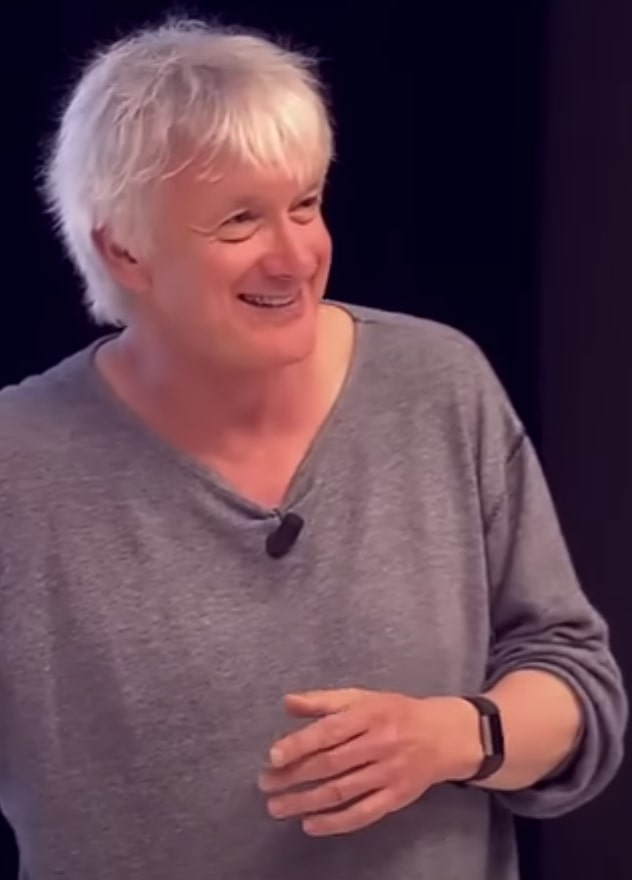
Campbell giving the 2017 Jean Nicod Prize lectures

John Campbell (born November 2, 1956) is a Scottish philosopher who is Willis S. and Marion Slusser Professor of Philosophy at the University of California, Berkeley. He works primarily in philosophy of mind.

== Education and career ==
Campbell earned a BA at the University of Stirling, Scotland in 1978; an MA at the University of Calgary, Canada in 1979; and a DPhil from Christ Church, Oxford in 1983 with a thesis under the title Spatiotemporal Thinking.

Before moving to Berkeley, Campbell taught at Oxford University for a number of years. He was a Fellow of New College. In 2000 he was awarded the Wilde Professorship of Mental Philosophy. He has additionally taught at the University of California, Los Angeles and King's College, Cambridge.

He was a Guggenheim Fellow, a Fellow at the Centre for Advanced Studies in Behavioural Sciences at Stanford University, a British Academy Research Reader and between 2003 and 2006 was the President of the European Society for Philosophy and Psychology. In 2017, he received the Jean Nicod Prize, and in 2023, he was elected a Fellow of the American Academy of Arts and Sciences.

== Philosophical work ==
Campbell specializes in the philosophy of mind with special emphasis on questions relating to perception.

His books include Past, Space, and Self (MIT Press, 1994), Reference and Consciousness (Oxford University Press, 2002), Berkeley’s Puzzle: What Does Experience Teach Us?, co-authored with Quassim Cassam (Oxford University Press, 2016), and Causation in Psychology (Harvard University Press, 2020).
