= Eckart Förster =

German philosopher

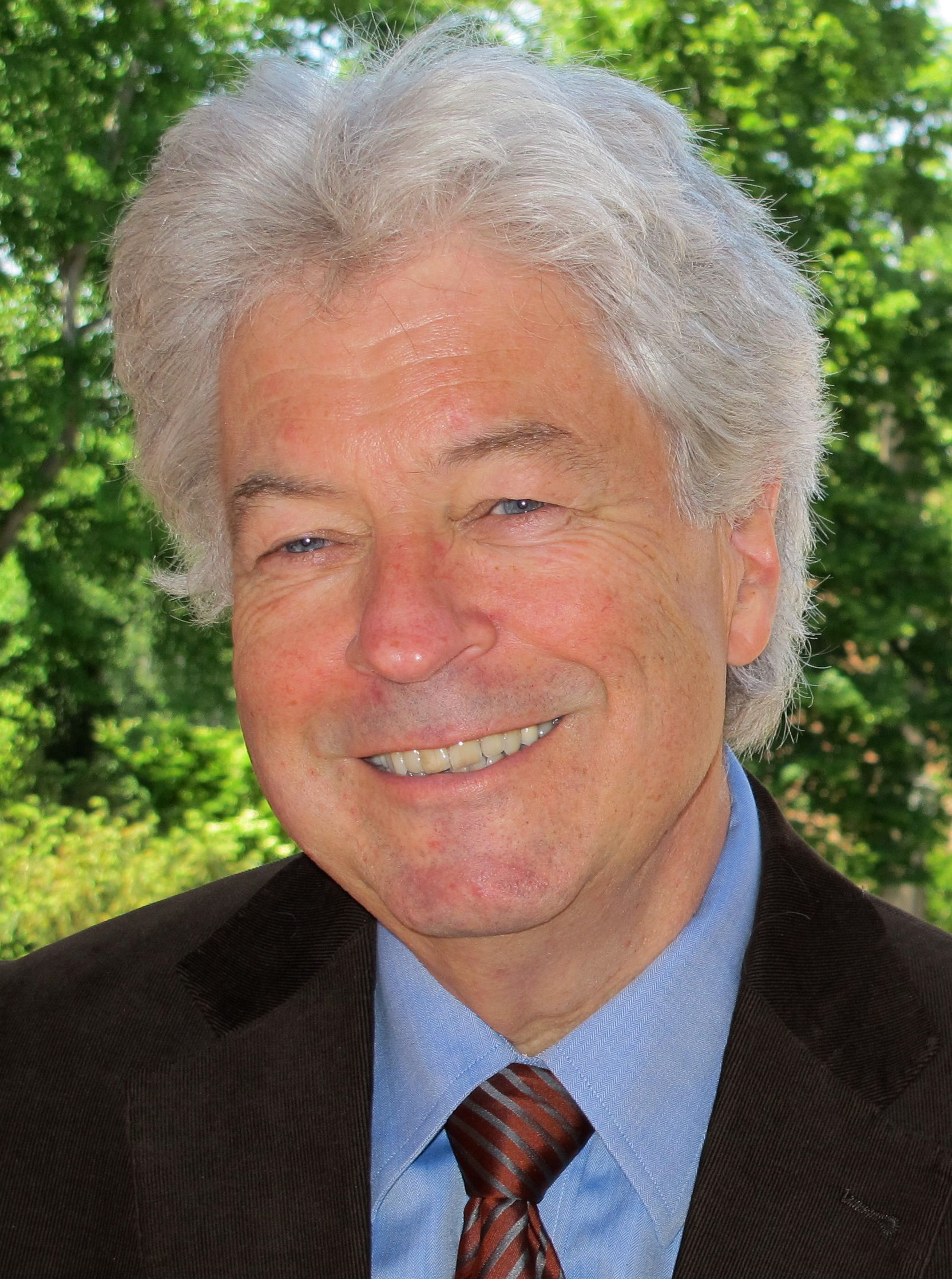
- Förster in 2011
- Born: January 12, 1952 (age 74); Bremen, West Germany

Academic background
- Education: University of Oxford (PhD)
- Thesis: Kant and the Problem of Transcendental Arguments (1981)
- Doctoral advisor: Peter Strawson

Academic work
- Era: Contemporary philosophy
- Discipline: Western philosophy
- School or tradition: German Idealism
- Institutions: Johns Hopkins University
- Website: https://philosophy.jhu.edu/directory/eckart-forster/

Eckart Förster (born January 12, 1952) is a German philosopher. His research centers on Immanuel Kant, German idealism, and Goethe's philosophy of science. He is best known for his book The Twenty-Five Years of Philosophy (2011), for which he received the Kuno Fischer Prize in 2017.

He taught as a professor of philosophy at Johns Hopkins University in Baltimore until becoming emeritus on January 1, 2021. Since 2004, he has been an honorary professor at Humboldt University of Berlin.

== Life ==
Förster studied from 1971 to 1973 at the Sankt Georgen Graduate School of Philosophy and Theology in Frankfurt am Main (Philosophicum 1973), from 1973 to 1976 philosophy in Frankfurt and from 1976 at the University of Oxford with a bachelor's degree in philosophy in 1979 (Prolegomena to a Theory of Transcendental Arguments) and a doctorate in 1982 (Kant and the Problem of Transcendental Arguments) under Peter Strawson. From 1980 to 1982 he was lecturer at Balliol College in Oxford, from 1982 to 1983 lecturer at Harvard University and from 1983 to 1996 professor at Stanford University (1983 assistant professor, 1990 associate professor, 1996 full professor), both in the Department of Philosophy and German Studies. In 1996, he became a full professor at LMU Munich (Chair II as successor to Dieter Henrich), which he remained until 2003. From 2001 to 2020, he was a professor at Johns Hopkins University. From 2004 to 2020, he was also an honorary professor at Humboldt University Berlin.

He was a visiting professor at Princeton University in 1988/89, at the Federal University of Porto Alegre in Brazil in 1998, at Ohio State University in 1999 (Max Kade visiting professor) and at New York University in 2022 (Eberhard Berent Goethe Chair).

In 1976, he became a Rhodes Scholar. He received the Ernest Walker Prize in Philosophy from Balliol College in 1979 and was a Fellow of the Stanford Humanity Center in 1987. In 1992, he received the Peter and Helen Bing Award for Excellence in Teaching at Stanford University. In 2005, he was a Guggenheim Fellow.

From 1998 he was a member of the Jacobi Commission and in 2000 of the Schelling Commission of the Bavarian Academy of Sciences and Humanities and from 2001 to 2012 of the Kant Commission of the Berlin-Brandenburg Academy of Sciences and Humanities.

== Works ==
He has published primarily on Kant and German Idealism as well as on Goethe's thought on natural science (Naturwissenschaft). His book 25 Years of Philosophy (2011), in which he traces why Kant saw himself at the beginning of the history of philosophy and why Hegel considered it to be finished with his work 25 years later, received much attention. The Japanese version of the book was published in 2021.

He was awarded the Kuno Fischer Prize of the University of Heidelberg for this book in 2017. He has also published on Kant's Opus postumum (English edition with commentary 1993), Goethe's philosophy of science, the Pythagorean tradition and Hölderlin.

He is the author of the articles Jacob Sigismund Beck in the Routledge Encyclopedia of Philosophy, Hölderlin in Metzler Lexikon Religiöser Denker (2000) and Gadamer in the Fontana Biographical Compendium of Modern Thought as well as contributions to the Kant-Lexikon (ed. Marcus Willaschek et al., de Gruyter 2015).

== Publications in English ==
=== Monographs ===
- The Twenty-Five Years of Philosophy: A Systematic Reconstruction. Harvard University Press. 2012. doi:10.4159/harvard.9780674064980. ISBN 978-0-674-06498-0.
- Kant's Final Synthesis: An Essay on the Opus Postumum. Harvard University Press. 2000. ISBN 978-0-674-00166-4.

=== Translations ===
- Kant, Immanuel (1993). Förster, Eckart; Rosen, Michael (eds.). Opus Postumum. The Cambridge Edition of the Works of Immanuel Kant. Cambridge: Cambridge University Press. doi:10.1017/cbo9780511625169. ISBN 978-0-521-31928-7.

=== Editions ===
- Förster, Eckart; Melamed, Yitzhak Y., eds. (2012). Spinoza and German Idealism. Cambridge: Cambridge University Press. doi:10.1017/cbo9781139135139. ISBN 978-1-107-02198-3.
- Henrich, Dieter (1997). Förster, Eckart (ed.). The Course of Remembrance and Other Essays on Hölderlin. Stanford University Press. doi:10.1515/9781503623866. ISBN 978-1-5036-2386-6.
- Förster, Eckart, ed. (1989). Kant's Transcendental Deductions: The Three 'Critiques' and the 'Opus postumum'. Stanford University Press. doi:10.1515/9781503621619. ISBN 978-1-5036-2161-9.

=== Articles ===
- Förster, Eckart (1987). "Is There "A Gap" in Kant's Critical System?". Journal of the History of Philosophy. 25 (4): 533–555. doi:10.1353/hph.1987.0079. ISSN 1538-4586.
- Förster, Eckart (1985), "Kant's Refutation of Idealism", Philosophy, its History and Historiography, Dordrecht: Springer Netherlands, pp. 287–303, doi:10.1007/978-94-009-5317-8_21, ISBN 978-94-011-7661-3
