= Christopher Peacocke =

British philosopher (born 1950)

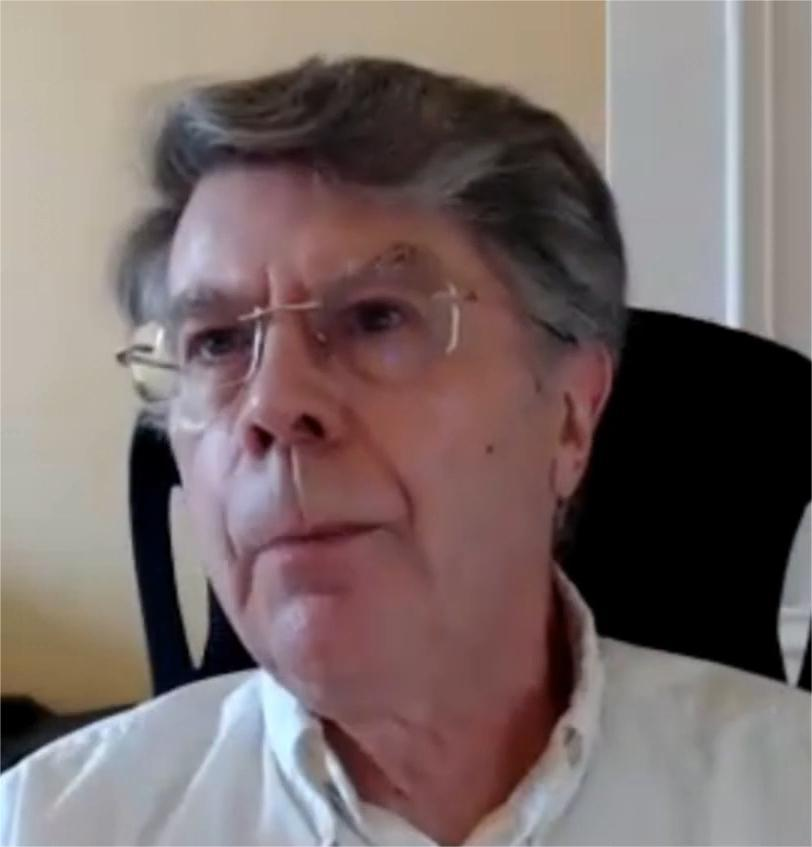
- Born: Christopher Arthur Bruce Peacocke; 22 May 1950 (age 76)
- Awards: the Henry Wilde Prize in Philosophy (1971); Kennedy Memorial Trust

Education
- Education: Magdalen College School; Exeter College, Oxford; Harvard University; All Souls College, Oxford
- Doctoral advisor: Michael Dummett

Philosophical work
- Era: Contemporary philosophy
- Region: Western philosophy
- School: Analytic
- Institutions: University of California, Berkeley; King's College, London; University of Oxford; New York University; Columbia University; University College London; New College of the Humanities
- Doctoral students: Martin Davies; Graeme Forbes
- Main interests: Epistemology, philosophy of mind
- Notable ideas: Theory of concept possession

Christopher Arthur Bruce Peacocke (born 22 May 1950) is a British philosopher known for his work in philosophy of mind and epistemology. His recent publications, in the field of epistemology, have defended a version of rationalism.

== Biography ==
Son of the British theologian and biochemist Arthur Peacocke, he was educated at Magdalen College School, Oxford, and Exeter College, Oxford, where he read philosophy, politics and economics as an undergraduate, winning both the Webb Medley Prize in Economics and the Henry Wilde Prize in Philosophy in 1971, and graduated with a first class degree. Later that year, he was awarded a Kennedy Memorial Trust scholarship to study at Harvard University. He then continued at Oxford, gaining a BPhil (1974) and DPhil (1979) in philosophy, the latter under the supervision of Michael Dummett.

He was visiting lecturer at University of California, Berkeley, 1975–76, and in 1975, elected to a fellowship at All Souls College, Oxford. He was the Susan Stebbing Professor of Philosophy at King's College London from 1985 to 1989 and Waynflete Professor of Metaphysical Philosophy at Oxford University from 1989 to 2000, at which time he moved to New York University (NYU). He joined the philosophy department at Columbia University in 2004, where he is now Johnsonian Professor of Philosophy. In 2007, he was named to the Richard Wollheim chair in philosophy at University College, London, where he taught in the third (summer) term each year until 2015. He lives with his wife and he has two adult children. He is also visiting professor of philosophy at New College of the Humanities.

== Philosophical work ==
Of his earlier work, he is perhaps best known for the first chapter of his 1983 book, Sense and Content, entitled "Sensation and the Content of Experience." In this chapter, Peacocke defends the claim that perceptual experience, over and above its intentional content, has certain "sensational properties". He gives three different examples of visual scenarios where intentional content alone cannot capture every aspect of the experience. Those aspects which elude intentional content are thought to be the sensational properties of the experience. Some of those who defend qualia have used these examples as evidence of their existence. Several philosophers have criticized these examples (Michael Tye, Fred Dretske), claiming that the supposed extra quality can indeed be captured in terms of intentional content.

In Sense and Content, Peacocke assumed that the intentional content of mental states is exclusively conceptual content, i.e. the content is such that the subject of the state needs to possess all the concepts that specify the intentional content in question. From about 1986 and onwards, Peacocke abandoned this assumption, arguing that some mental states, in particular perceptual experiences and representational states implicated in subpersonal information processing (for example, in the subconscious parsing of heard speech), have non-conceptual intentional content. Peacocke is now often seen as a leading proponent of this notion of non-conceptual intentional content.

In his 1992 book A Study of Concepts, Peacocke gives a detailed exposition of a philosophical theory of concept possession, according to which the nature and identity conditions for concepts may be given, in a non-circular way, by the conditions a thinker has to satisfy in order to possess the relevant concepts. The theory is a version of a so-called "conceptual" or "inferential role" theory of concepts.

== Works ==
=== Articles ===
- Understanding logical constants: a realist's account (1987), British Academy lecture.
- "Truth Definitions and Actual Languages." In: Gareth Evans and John McDowell, eds., Truth and Meaning: Essays in Semantics, Oxford University Press, 1976.

=== Books ===
- Holistic Explanation: Action, Space, Interpretation, Oxford University Press, 1979.
- Sense and Content, Oxford, 1983.
- Thoughts: An Essay on Content, Blackwell, 1986.
- A Study of Concepts, MIT, 1992.
- Being Known, Oxford, 1999.
- The Realm of Reason, Oxford, 2003.
- Truly Understood, Oxford, 2008.
- The Mirror of the World: Subjects, Consciousness, and Self-Consciousness, Oxford, 2014.
- The Primacy of Metaphysics, Oxford, 2019.
