= Gareth Evans (philosopher) =

British philosopher (1946–1980)

- Evans in 1973
- Born: Michael Gareth Justin Evans; 12 May 1946; London, England
- Died: 10 August 1980 (aged 34); London, England

Education
- Education: Dulwich College; University College, Oxford; Christ Church, Oxford; Harvard University; University of California, Berkeley
- Academic advisor: Peter Strawson

Philosophical work
- Era: 20th-century philosophy
- Region: Western philosophy
- School: Analytic philosophy
- Institutions: University College, Oxford
- Doctoral students: Martin Davies
- Main interests: Logic, metaphysics, philosophy of language, philosophy of mind, theory of reference
- Notable ideas: Metaphysical vagueness Nonconceptual mental content

Michael Gareth Justin Evans (12 May 1946 – 10 August 1980) was a British philosopher who made substantial contributions to logic, philosophy of language and philosophy of mind. He is best known for his posthumous work The Varieties of Reference (1982), edited by John McDowell. The book considers different kinds of reference to objects, and argues for a number of conditions that must obtain for reference to occur. Evans died prematurely at age 34 of cancer.

== Life ==
Gareth Evans was born in London on 12 May 1946. He was educated at Dulwich College and University College, Oxford (1964–67) where he read Philosophy, Politics and Economics (PPE). His philosophy tutor was Peter Strawson, one of the most eminent Oxford philosophers of the time. Evans became close friends with philosopher Derek Parfit and other prominent members of his academic field such as Christopher Peacocke and Crispin Wright. He was a senior scholar at Christ Church, Oxford (1967–68) and a Kennedy Scholar at Harvard University and University of California, Berkeley (1968–69).

Evans then returned to Oxford, where he was a fellow (1969–1979) and then, from 1979, the Wilde Reader in Mental Philosophy. During this time he also held visiting positions at the University of Minnesota (1971) and the Massachusetts Institute of Technology (1977–8).

In 1978, during a visit to Mexico City, Evans was shot in the leg during the altercations that led to the kidnapping and death of Mexican philosopher Hugo Margáin Charles, who at the time was the director of the Institute of Philosophical Investigations at UNAM and Evans' brother-in-law.

He died in London in 1980 of cancer at the age of 34. His collected papers (1985) and his major work, The Varieties of Reference (1982), edited by John McDowell, were published posthumously.

Gregory McCulloch, in The Oxford Companion to Philosophy, writes of Evans that his "very early death was, like Ramsey's, a serious loss for British philosophy." In the acknowledgements of his Reasons and Persons Derek Parfit writes "I owe much to the intensity of his love of truth, and his extraordinary vitality."

== Work ==
In his brief career Evans made substantial contributions to logic, metaphysics, philosophy of language, and philosophy of mind. Important influences on his work included Strawson and Michael Dummett amongst others. His research, according to Rick Grush, "aimed at understanding semantics, and he produced seminal work on proper names, pronouns, indexicals, demonstratives, and vagueness."

Evans was one of many in the UK who took up the project of developing formal semantics for natural languages, initiated by Donald Davidson in the 1960s and 1970s. He co-edited Truth and Meaning (1976) with John McDowell on this subject. He also wrote a paper, "The Causal Theory of Names" (1973), which heavily criticised certain lines of the theory of reference that derived from Saul Kripke's Naming and Necessity (1972/1980) and work by Keith Donnellan.

A one-page paper on metaphysical vagueness in Analysis, "Can There Be Vague Objects?" (1978), drew dozens of papers in response and is now considered a key work in metaphysics.

=== The Varieties of Reference ===
Evans' book The Varieties of Reference (1982) was unfinished at the time of his death. The introduction and first two chapters were rewritten by him in the last months of his life. It was edited for publication, and supplemented with appendices drawn from his notes, by McDowell. It has subsequently been influential in both philosophy of mind and philosophy of language. Its central chapters have, according to Martin Davies, had "a profound influence on subsequent work in philosophy of psychology, particularly concerning the perception and representation of space, and more generally the conditions for an objective conception of a spatial world."

==== Background ====
The theory of reference prior to the 1970s was dominated by the view that the meaning of an ordinary name is a description of its object: so, for example, Aristotle means the author of De Caelo. This was Russell's view, and was and is taken by many to be equivalent to Frege's view (where the description is what Frege calls a term's "sense"). A more complex version of this view was developed by John Searle, who held that a proper name refers to whatever object fits enough of the descriptions in a cluster of descriptions associated with a name. But following Kripke's Naming and Necessity (1972/1980) lectures, the view came to prevail that names had no descriptive content, or sense: that the referent of a name was not what "fit" its meaning, but whichever object had been the initial cause of the name's being used.

==== Evans's project ====
Evans concedes that names do not in general have descriptive meanings (although he contends that they could, in some cases), but argues that the proponents of the new theory had much too simplistic a view. He argues for what he calls Russell's principle: that a person cannot be thinking about an object unless he knows, in some non-trivial way, which object he is thinking about. In particular, Evans argues that a person must have a "discriminating conception" of the object (1982, p. 65).

From Russell's work, Evans also draws the point that some of the thoughts one has (thoughts about objects one is perceiving, for example) are such that if their object did not exist it would not be possible to think that thought at all. These he calls Russellian thoughts.

He then claims that a certain version of the new theory, which he calls the photograph model of mental representation (1982, p. 78), violates Russell's principle. According to the photograph model, "the causal antecedents of the information involved in a mental state... are claimed to be sufficient to determine which object the state concerns" (1982, p. 78). (The view is so named because it is similar to the view many people take on how a photograph comes to be about something.) Thus, on the photograph model, contrary to Russell's principle, one may have a thought about some object without discriminating knowledge of that object, just so long as the mental state is caused in the appropriate way (for example, perhaps by some sort of causal chain that originates with the object).

Evans argues that any causal theory of reference, like that of the photograph model, must be restricted in certain ways: it is necessary to consider, one by one, the various kinds of Russellian thoughts people can have about objects, and to specify in each case what conditions must be met for them to meet Russell's principle—only under those conditions can one have a thought about a specific object or objects (a singular thought).

In particular, Evans discusses at length what he calls the generality constraint. Evans states it thus:

...if a subject can be credited with the thought that a is F, then he must have the conceptual resources for entertaining the thought that a is G, for every property of being G of which he has a conception (1982, p. 104).

The generality constraint, according to Evans, is intended to capture the structure that there is in thought. As Evans puts it, "The thought that John is happy has something in common with the thought that Harry is happy, and the thought that John is happy has something in common with the thought that John is sad" (1982, p. 100). The generality constraint requires that if one is to have a thought (that John is happy, for example) about an object (John), then one must be able to conceive of the object (John) as having different properties (such as being sad).

He also defends a reading of Frege, derived in part from Michael Dummett's work, according to which Frege's notion of sense is not equivalent to a description, and indeed remains essential to a theory of reference that abandoned descriptivism (1982, §1.3).

==== Kinds of reference ====
The bulk of the text considers three kinds of reference to objects, and argues for a number of conditions that must obtain for reference to occur.

He considers first demonstrative reference, where one speaks or thinks about an object visible in one's vicinity. He argues that these presuppose, among other things: having a correct conception of the kind of object that it is; the ability to conceive of it and oneself as located in an objective space, and to orient oneself within that space; that one must move smoothly through time and space and be able to track the object's movements continuously in perception.

He next considers reference to oneself and then reference by way of a capacity for recognition: one's ability to (re-)identify an object when presented with it, even if it is not available at present. Evans famously considers the phenomenon of immunity to error through misidentification—a phenomenon of certain types of judgment in which one cannot be wrong about which object the judgment is about by misidentifying it (see his 1982, especially §6.6 & §7.2). This phenomenon may be exemplified by the incoherence of the following judgment (upon feeling pain): "Someone seems to be feeling pain, but is it I who is feeling the pain?". While this phenomenon has been noticed by philosophers before, Evans argues that they have tended to think that it only applies to judgments concerning oneself and one's conscious experiences, and so they have failed to recognise that it is a more general phenomenon that can occur in any sort of demonstrative judgment. Furthermore, he would charge philosophers such as Ludwig Wittgenstein (in his Blue and Brown Books [1958]) and Elizabeth Anscombe (in her "The First Person" [1975]) for having wrongly concluded that such cases show that the first-person pronoun "I" does not refer to anything.

==== Language issues ====
In the last third of the book Evans turns to problems with reference to objects that actively depend on the use of language. Here he treats the use of proper names, which do not seem to presuppose as much knowledge on the part of the speaker as demonstrative or recognition-based identification. One can refer to an object one has never encountered using a name if the name was received in the right sort of linguistic (social) practice—even, apparently, if one has no true beliefs about the object. He also considers problems of reference to objects in fictions and hallucinations, and to the meaning of saying that something exists which does not (here he draws explicitly on Kripke's John Locke Lectures titled Reference and Existence).

== Works ==
- 1973, "The Causal Theory of Names," Aristotelian Society Supplementary Volume xlvii, pp. 187–208.
- 1975, "Identity and Predication," Journal of Philosophy lxxii, pp. 343–363.
- 1976(a), Truth and Meaning: Essays in Semantics (co-edited with John McDowell), Oxford: Oxford University Press.
- 1976(b), "Semantic Structure and Logical Form," in Evans and McDowell (eds.), 1976(a), pp. 199–222.
- 1977, "Pronouns, Quantifiers, and Relative Clauses (I)"), Canadian Journal of Philosophy vii, pp. 467–536.
- 1977, "Pronouns, Quantifiers, and Relative Clauses (II): Appendix". Canadian Journal of Philosophy. vii pp. 777–797.
- 1978, "Can There Be Vague Objects?" Analysis Vol. 38, No. 4, p. 208.
- 1979, "Reference and Contingency," The Monist lxii, pp. 161–189.
- 1980, "Pronouns," Linguistic Inquiry xi, pp. 337–362.
- 1980, "Things Without the Mind," in Zak van Straaten (ed.), Philosophical Subjects: Essays Presented to P.F. Strawson, Oxford: Clarendon Press, pp. 76–116.
- 1981, "Understanding Demonstratives," in Herman Parret and Jacques Bouveresse (eds.), Meaning and Understanding, Berlin and New York: De Gruyter, pp. 280–303.
- 1982, The Varieties of Reference (published posthumously, edited by John McDowell), Oxford: Oxford University Press.
- 1985(a), Collected Papers, Oxford: Oxford University Press.
- 1985(b), "Does tense logic rest on a mistake?" In Evans. 1985(a)
- 1986(c), "Molyneux's question," In Evans. 1985(a)
- 2004, "Comment on 'Two notions of necessity'." Philosophical Studies, 118, 11–16.
