= Graeme Forbes (philosopher) =

American philosopher

- Born: Graeme Robertson Forbes

Education
- Education: University of Glasgow; University of Oxford (DPhil, 1980)
- Doctoral advisor: Christopher Peacocke
- Other advisor: J. L. Mackie

Philosophical work
- Era: Contemporary philosophy
- Region: Western philosophy
- School: Analytic
- Institutions: University of Colorado Boulder
- Main interests: Semantics, metaphysics, logic
- Notable ideas: Canonical counterpart theory

Graeme Robertson Forbes is an American philosopher and logician and Professor of Philosophy at the University of Colorado Boulder and former Celia Scott Weatherhead Distinguished Professor at Tulane University.

== Books ==
- The Metaphysics of Modality, Oxford University Press, 1985
- Languages of Possibility, Oxford: Blackwell, 1989
- Modern Logic, Oxford University Press, 1994
- Attitude Problems, Oxford: Clarendon Press, 2006
