= Animalism (philosophy) =

Philosophical theory that humans are animals

In the philosophical subdiscipline of ontology, animalism is a theory of personal identity that asserts that humans are animals. The concept of animalism is advocated by philosophers Eric T. Olson, Peter van Inwagen, Paul Snowdon, Stephan Blatti, David Hershenov and David Wiggins. The view stands in contrast to positions such as John Locke's psychological criterion for personal identity or various forms of mind–body dualism, such as Richard Swinburne's account.

== Thinking-animal argument ==
A common argument for animalism is known as the thinking-animal argument. It asserts the following:

1. A person that occupies a given space also has a Homo sapiens animal occupying the same space.
2. The Homo sapiens animal is thinking.
3. The person occupying the space is thinking.
4. Therefore, a human person is also a human animal.

== Use of term in ethics ==
A less common, but perhaps increasing, use of the term animalism is to refer to the ethical view that all or most animals are worthy of moral consideration. It may be similar, though not necessarily, to sentientism.

== See also ==
- Human evolution
