= Disjunctivism =

Disjunctivism (or the disjunctive theory of perception) is a position in the philosophy of perception that rejects the existence of sense data in certain cases. The disjunction is between appearance and the reality behind the appearance "making itself perceptually manifest to someone."

== Overview ==
Disjunctivism claims, against the argument from hallucination, that veridical perceptions and hallucinations are not members of a common class of mental states or events. The argument from hallucination claims that since hallucinations can be indistinguishable from veridical perceptions, the two states belong to a common class of mental states. According to disjunctivism, the only thing common to veridical perceptions and hallucinations is that in both cases, the subject cannot tell, via introspection, whether he is having a veridical perception or not; but they resist the inference from the indistinguishability of the states to the metaphysical claim that the two states belong to the same class of mental states.

A motivating factor for disjunctivism is that it allows the theorist to hold on to the claim that in cases of veridical perception, a subject's experience actually presents the external, mind-independent object of that perception. Disjunctivism enables the theorist to claim that despite the indistinguishability, in a hallucination there is no external object to be related to, nor are there sense-data to be a part of the perception. Most disjunctivists are also naive realists.

Disjunctivism was first introduced to the contemporary literature by Michael Hinton, and has been most prominently associated with John McDowell and Paul Snowdon. It has also been defended at length by Duncan Pritchard. Disjunctivists often hold that an important virtue of their view is that it captures the common sense idea that perception involves a relation to objects in the world.
