= Eric T. Olson (philosopher) =

American philosopher

Philosophical work
- Era: Contemporary philosophy
- Region: Western Philosophy
- School: Analytic philosophy
- Main interests: Metaphysics; Philosophy of mind Personal identity
- Notable ideas: Animalism

Eric Todd Olson is an American philosopher who specializes in metaphysics and philosophy of mind. Olson is best known for his research in the field of personal identity, and for advocating animalism, the theory that persons are animals. Olson received a BA from Reed College and a PhD from Syracuse University. Olson is currently a professor of philosophy at the University of Sheffield.

== Bibliography ==
- The Human Animal: Personal Identity Without Psychology. New York: Oxford University Press, 1997.
- What Are We? A Study in Personal Ontology. New York: Oxford University Press, 2007.
- Do We Have a Soul?: A Debate. With Aaron Segal. New York: Routledge, 2023.
