= Duncan Pritchard =

American philosophy professor

Duncan Pritchard FRSE
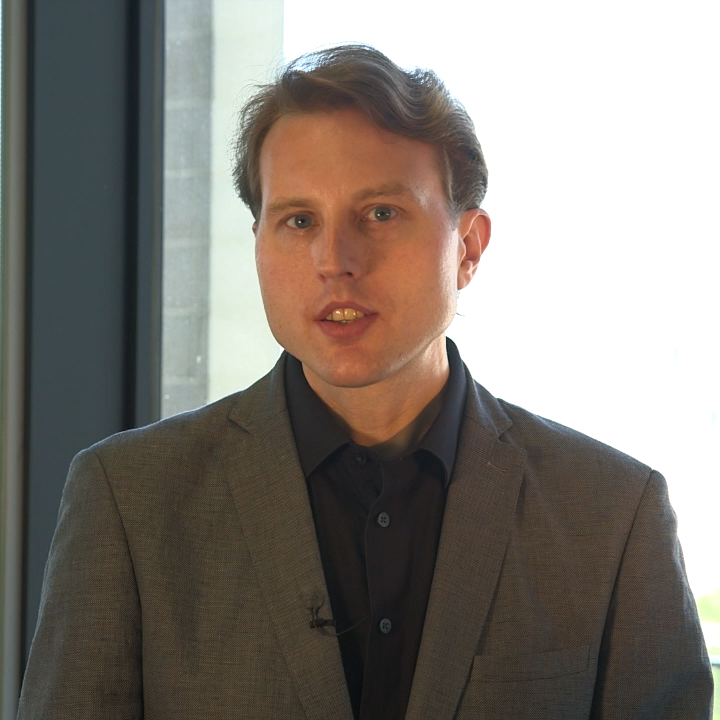
- Pritchard in 2016

Education
- Education: University of St Andrews

Philosophical work
- Era: Contemporary philosophy
- Region: Western philosophy
- School: Analytic philosophy
- Institutions: University of California, Irvine
- Main interests: Epistemology
- Notable ideas: Epistemological disjunctivism

Duncan Pritchard is a Scottish philosopher. He is the chancellor's professor of philosophy and the director of graduate studies at the University of California, Irvine. He was previously professor of philosophy and chair in epistemology at the University of Edinburgh. His research is mainly in the field of epistemology. He has studied the problem of scepticism, the epistemic externalism/internalism distinction; the rationality of religious belief; testimony; the relationship between epistemic and content externalism; virtue epistemology; epistemic value; modal epistemology; Wittgensteinian hinge epistemology; the history of scepticism; and epistemological contextualism.

== Education and career ==
He received his PhD in philosophy from the University of St Andrews.

He received the Philip Leverhulme Prize for his research in philosophy in 2007. He received a chair in epistemology in 2007. He was also elected to a Fellowship of the Royal Society of Edinburgh in 2011 for his works in philosophy.

== Books ==
The books of Pritchard:

- Epistemology, (Palgrave Macmillan, 2016). [NB. This is the retitled second edition of Knowledge].
- Epistemic Angst: Radical Skepticism and the Groundlessness of Our Believing (Princeton University Press, 2015).
- What is this Thing Called Philosophy?, (editor, Routledge, 2015).
- Philosophy for Everyone, (editor, with M. Chrisman, Routledge, 2013).
- Epistemological Disjunctivism (Oxford University Press, 2012).
- Knowledge, (Palgrave Macmillan, 1st ed. 2009). [The second edition of this textbook has been retitled Epistemology—see above].
- What is this Thing Called Knowledge?, (Routledge, 1st ed. 2006; 2nd ed. 2009; 3rd ed. 2013; 4th ed. 2018; 5th ed. 2023).
- Epistemology A-Z (with M. Blaauw), (Edinburgh UP/Palgrave Macmillan, 2005)
