= Philosophical Psychology (journal) =

- Discipline: Philosophy
- Language: English
- Edited by: Lisa Bortolotti

Publication details
- History: 1988–present
- Publisher: Routledge
- Frequency: 8 issues a year
- Impact factor: 1.573 (2021)

Standard abbreviations
- ISO 4: Philos. Psychol.

Indexing
- ISSN: 0951-5089 (print); 1465-394X (web)
- LCCN: sn88026864
- OCLC no.: 290556522

Links
- Journal homepage; Online access; Online archive

Philosophical Psychology is a peer-reviewed academic journal devoted to the links between philosophy and psychology.

The journal publishes research in ethical and philosophical issues emerging from the cognitive sciences, social sciences, and affective sciences, neurosciences, comparative psychology, clinical psychology, psychopathology, psychiatry, psychoanalysis, educational psychology, health psychology, analytic philosophy, moral psychology, phenomenology, history of psychology, and experimental philosophy.

According to the Journal Citation Reports, the journal has a 2021 impact factor of 1.573.

Since January 2021, Philosophical Psychology subscribes to the British Philosophical Association Good Practice Scheme and to the Barcelona Principles for a Globally Inclusive Philosophy, taking steps to ensure that members of underrepresented groups in academic philosophy (such as women and non-native speakers of English) are involved as journal editors, editorial board members, authors, and readers. (For more information, see "Journal News". Daily Nous. 2021.)

Philosophical Psychology has calls for papers on topics of interest to the general public that can be investigated by philosophers and psychologists, such as collective irrationalities, bias, and trustworthiness.

== Societies ==
Philosophical Psychology has links with the European Society for Philosophy and Psychology (ESPP).

== Most cited articles ==
Partial list of most cited articles (in date order):

- Neisser, Ulric (1988). "Five kinds of self-knowledge". Philosophical Psychology. 1 (1): 35–59. doi:10.1080/09515088808572924. Pdf.
- Chalmers, David J. (1993). "Connectionism and compositionality: Why Fodor and Pylyshyn were wrong (symposium)". Philosophical Psychology. 6 (3): 305–319. doi:10.1080/09515089308573094.
- Revonsuo, Antti (1995). "Consciousness, dreams and virtual realities". Philosophical Psychology. 8 (1): 35–58. doi:10.1080/09515089508573144.
- Gallagher, Shaun; Meltzoff, Andrew N. (1996). "The earliest sense of self and others: Merleau-Ponty and recent developmental studies". Philosophical Psychology. 9 (2): 211–233. doi:10.1080/09515089608573181. PMC 3845406. PMID 24307757.
- Knobe, Joshua (2003). "Intentional action in folk psychology: An experimental investigation". Philosophical Psychology. 16 (2): 309–324. CiteSeerX 10.1.1.318.5898. doi:10.1080/09515080307771. S2CID 12326690. Pdf.
- Hutchins, Edwin (2014). "The cultural ecosystem of human cognition". Philosophical Psychology. 27 (1): 34–49. doi:10.1080/09515089.2013.830548.
- Chapman, Robert (2020). "The reality of autism: On the metaphysics of disorder and diversity". Philosophical Psychology. 33 (6): 799–819. doi:10.1080/09515089.2020.1751103. hdl:1983/309dc16c-cfe9-4356-81b8-6d95510b5eb0.

== See also ==
- List of ethics journals
- List of philosophy journals
