= P. F. Strawson =

English philosopher (1919–2006)

Sir Peter Strawson FBA
- Born: Peter Frederick Strawson; 23 November 1919; Ealing, London, England
- Died: 13 February 2006 (aged 86); London, England
- Burial place: Wolvercote Cemetery, Oxford, England
- Children: 4, including Galen

Education
- Education: St John's College, Oxford (PPE)
- Academic advisor: Paul Grice

Philosophical work
- Era: Contemporary philosophy
- Region: Western philosophy
- School: Analytic
- Institutions: University of Oxford
- Doctoral students: Eckart Förster, A. C. Grayling, John Searle
- Notable students: Peter Achinstein, Gareth Evans, Paul Snowdon
- Main interests: Philosophy of language · Philosophy of mind
- Notable ideas: Ordinary language philosophy Personal reactive attitudes The distinction between sortal and characterising universals The distinction between particular individuals (such as historical events, material objects and persons) and non-particular individuals (such as qualities, properties, numbers, species); The "descriptive metaphysics" and "revisionary metaphysics" distinction

Sir Peter Frederick Strawson (/ˈstrɔːsən/; 23 November 1919 – 13 February 2006) was an English philosopher who spent most of his career at the University of Oxford. He was the Waynflete Professor of Metaphysical Philosophy at Magdalen College, Oxford, from 1968 to 1987. He had previously held the positions of college lecturer and tutorial fellow at University College, Oxford, a college he returned to upon his retirement in 1987, and which provided him with rooms until his death.

Paul Snowdon and Anil Gomes, in the Stanford Encyclopedia of Philosophy, comment that Strawson "exerted a considerable influence on philosophy, both during his lifetime and, indeed, since his death."

== Life ==
Strawson was born in Ealing, west London, and brought up in Finchley, north London, by his parents, both of whom were teachers. He was educated at Christ's College, Finchley, followed by St John's College, Oxford, where he read Philosophy, Politics and Economics. Strawson was a pupil of Paul Grice, who later became his colleague and collaborator.

During the Second World War, Strawson served first with the Royal Artillery from 1940, and then with the Royal Electrical and Mechanical Engineers. He was demobilised in 1946, with the rank of captain.

After his military service, he initially went to the (then) University College of North Wales at Bangor, as an assistant lecturer. After winning the John Locke scholarship in 1946, and the support of Gilbert Ryle, he went to University College, Oxford, initially as a lecturer, and then, from 1948, as a fellow. In 1968 he succeeded Gilbert Ryle as the Waynflete Professor of Metaphysical Philosophy in Oxford.

Strawson was made a Fellow of the British Academy in 1960 and a Foreign Honorary Member of the American Academy of Arts and Sciences in 1971. He was president of the Aristotelian Society from 1969 to 1970. He was knighted in 1977, for services to philosophy.

== Philosophical work ==
Strawson first became well known with his article "On Referring" (1950), a criticism of Bertrand Russell's theory of descriptions (see also Definite descriptions) that Russell explained in the famous "On Denoting" article (1905).

In philosophical methodology, there are (at least) two important and interrelated features of Strawson's work that are worthy of note. The first is the project of a 'descriptive' metaphysics, and the second is his notion of a shared conceptual scheme, composed of concepts operated in everyday life. In his book Individuals (1959), Strawson attempts to describe various concepts that form an interconnected web, representing (part of) our common, shared, human conceptual scheme. In particular, he examines our conceptions of basic particulars, and how they are variously brought under general spatio-temporal concepts. What makes this a metaphysical project is that it exhibits, in fine detail, the structural features of our thought about the world, and thus precisely delimits how we, humans, think about reality.

Strawson's Individuals played a role in reviving the field of metaphysics following its unpopularity during the period following the linguistic turn, although the metaphysics which followed Strawson was different; Strawson was only concerned with describing the logical structure of our thinking about the world.

Strawson was a collaborator of his former tutor Paul Grice; together they published a famous paper titled "In Defence of a Dogma" in reply to W. V. O. Quine's "Two Dogmas of Empiricism". Grice was reluctant to commit his ideas to print, and according to Strawson, "it was only after persistent bullying on my part that he brought himself, some years after its composition, to publish his own highly original, ingenious, and justly celebrated first article on Meaning (1957)".

Strawson distinguished between 'revisionary' and 'descriptive metaphysics', he wrote: "Descriptive metaphysics is content to describe the actual structure of our thought about the world, revisionary metaphysics is concerned to produce a better structure". The purpose of the former is to "lay bare the most general features of our conceptual scheme" and to understand structures which do not "readily display itself on the structures of language but lies submerged" by analysing those metaphysical concepts which have always existed. He lists Aristotle and Kant as descriptive and Descartes and Leibniz as revisionary.

=== "Freedom and Resentment" ===
One of Strawson's most important contributions to philosophy was his answer to the dilemma of determinism. This dilemma states that deterministic metaphysical theories are incompatible with moral responsibility, because having moral responsibility requires having an indeterministic free will. Strawson argues in "Freedom and Resentment" (read at the British Academy on 9 May 1962) that moral responsibility can be grounded in a naturalistic physics that precedes metaphysics, and thus metaphysical concepts like determinism do not necessarily have any bearing on it. His naturalistic version of morality is based on 'reactive attitudes'; intuitions had in response to witnessing people's actions and the motivations behind them. These reactive attitudes are the impetus for moral judgements, and thus a system of morality can be constructed without needing any specific metaphysical concepts.

Strawson goes on to detail how morality is constructed from reactive attitudes. Firstly, he states that reactive attitudes can be modified by statements that either minimize the agent's responsibility for their action, or diminish their status as a morally responsible agent in general. For example, statements such as 'He couldn't help it' or 'He's only a child' invite reconsideration of one's reactive attitudes towards the action. Secondly, he distinguishes several different types of reactive attitudes. Personal reactive attitudes are made by a person who is directly affected by someone else's action, impersonal reactive attitudes are attitudes towards an action committed by someone else towards a third party ("resentment on behalf of another"), and self-reflective attitudes are attitudes towards one's own actions. Impersonal and self-reflective reactive attitudes play a role in producing a morality that is not purely egoistic, and Strawson contends that most people are capable of having all three types of reactive attitudes due to their "common roots in human nature".

== Personal life ==
After serving as a captain in the Royal Electrical and Mechanical Engineers during World War II, Strawson married Ann Martin in 1945. They had four children, including the philosopher Galen Strawson.

Strawson lived in Oxford all his adult life and died in hospital on 13 February 2006 after a short illness. He was the elder brother of Major General John Strawson.

His obituary in The Guardian noted that "Oxford was the world capital of philosophy between 1950 and 1970, and American academics flocked there, rather than the traffic going the other way. That golden age had no greater philosopher than Sir Peter Strawson."

In its obituary, The Times of London described him as a "philosopher of matchless range who made incisive, influential contributions to problems of language and metaphysics". The author went on to say:

Few scholars achieve lasting fame as dramatically as did the philosopher Sir Peter Strawson. By 1950 Strawson, then a Fellow of University College, Oxford, was already a respected tutor and a promising member of the group of younger Oxford dons whose careful attention to the workings of natural languages marked them out as 'linguistic' philosophers. [He published] extraordinary papers, which are still read and discussed more than 50 years later and which are prescribed to tyros as models of philosophical criticism.

His portrait was painted by the artists Muli Tang and Daphne Todd.

== Works ==
=== Books ===
- Introduction to Logical Theory, (London: Methuen, 1952)
  - Italian translation by A. Visalberghi (Torino: Einaudi, 1961)
  - Japanese translation by S. Tsunetoshi, et al. (Kyoto: Houritsu Bunkasya, 1994)
- Individuals: An Essay in Descriptive Metaphysics, (London: Methuen, 1959)
  - German translation by F. Scholz (Stuttgart: Reclam, 1972)
  - French translation by A. Shalom and P. Drong (Paris: Editions du Seuil, 1973)
  - Italian translation by E. Bencivenga (Milan: Feltrinelli, 1978)
  - Japanese translation by H. Nakamura (Tokyo: Misuzu Shobo, 1978)
  - Polish translation by B. Chwedenczuk (Warsaw: Wydawniczy Pax, 1980)
  - Spanish translation by A. Suarez and L. Villanueva (Madrid: Taurus, 1989)
  - Brazilian Portuguese translation by P. J. Smith (São Paulo: Editora Unesp, 2019)
- The Bounds of Sense: An Essay on Kant's Critique of Pure Reason. (London: Methuen, 1966)
  - Spanish translation by C. Luis Andre (Madrid: Revista de Occidente, 1975)
  - German translation by E. Lange (Hain, 1981)
  - Italian translation by M. Palumbo (Roma-Bari: Laterza, 1985)
  - Japanese translation by T. Kumagai, et al. (Tokyo: Keiso Shobo, 1987)
- Logico-Linguistic Papers. (London: Methuen, 1971)
- Freedom and Resentment and other Essays, (London: Methuen, 1974)
- Subject and Predicate in Logic and Grammar, (London: Methuen, 1974)
- Skepticism and Naturalism: Some Varieties, (New York: Columbia University Press, 1985)
  - French Translation Scepticisme et naturalisme: Quelques variétés (trans. Benoît Gide), (Lyon: ENS Lyon, 2026)
- Analysis and Metaphysics: An Introduction to Philosophy. (Oxford: Oxford University Press, 1992)
  - Estonian translation by T. Hallap (Tartu: University of Tartu Press, 2016)
- Entity and Identity, (Oxford: Oxford University Press, 1997)
- Philosophical Writings, ed. Galen Strawson and Michelle Montague, (Oxford University Press, 2011)

=== Articles ===
- "Necessary Propositions and Entailment Statements" (Mind, 1948)
- "Truth" (Analysis, 1949) reprinted in MacDonald, Margaret (ed.) Philosophy and Analysis (1966) [1954]
- "Ethical Intuitionism" (Philosophy, 1949), reprinted in Philosophical Writings (2011) and Sellars and Hospers, Readings in Ethical Theory (1952)
- "Truth" (Proceedings of the Aristotelian Society suppl. vol. xxiv, 1950), reprinted in Longworth, Guy (ed.) Virtual Issue One: Truth (2013)
- "On Referring" (Mind, 1950), reprinted in Copi, Irving (ed.) Contemporary Readings in Logical Theory (1967)
- "Particular and General" (Proceedings of the Aristotelian Society, 1953
- "Wittgenstein's Philosophical Investigations (Mind, vol. 63, 1954)
- "A Logician's Landscape" (Philosophy, Vol. 30, 1955)
- "Construction and Analysis" in A.J. Ayer et al., The Revolution in Philosophy. London: Macmillan, 1956
- "Singular Terms, Ontology and Identity" (Mind, Vol. 65, 1956)
- "In Defence of a Dogma" with H. P. Grice (Philosophical Review, 1956), reprinted in Philosophical Writings (2011)
- "Logical Subjects and Physical Objects" (Philosophy and Phenomenological Research, 1957)
- "Propositions, Concepts and Logical Truths" (Philosophical Quarterly, Vol. 7, 1957)
- "Proper Names" (Proceedings of the Aristotelian Society, Supp. Vol. 31, 1957), reprinted in Philosophical Writings (2011)
- "On Justifying Induction" (Philosophical Studies, 1958)
- "The Post-Linguistic Thaw" (Times Literary Supplement, 1960), reprinted in Philosophical Writings (2011)
- "Freedom and Resentment" (Proceedings of the British Academy, Vol. 48, 1962)
- "Singular Terms and Predication" (Journal of Philosophy, 1961), reprinted in Philosophical Logic (1967)
- "Perception and Identification" (Proceedings of the Aristotelian Society, Supp. Vol. 35, 1961)
- "Carnap's Views on Constructed Systems v. Natural Languages in Analytical Philosophy" in The Philosophy of Rudolf Carnap, ed. P.A. Schilpp (La Salle Ill.: Open Court, 1963)
- " A Problem about Truth: A reply to Mr. Warnock" in Truth, ed. G. Pitcher, Englewood Cliffs (N.J.: Prentice Hall, 1964)
- "Truth: A Reconsideration of Austin's Views" (Philosophical Quarterly, Vol. 15, 1965)
- "Self, Mind and Body" (Common Factor, Vol. 4, 1966)
- "Is Existence Never A Predicate" (Critica, Vol. 1, 1967)
- "Bennett on Kant's Analytic" (Philosophical Review, Vol. 77, 1968), reprinted in Philosophical Writings (2011)
- "Meaning and Truth" (Proceedings of the British Academy, Oxford: Oxford University Press, 1969)
- "Analysis, Science, and Metaphysics" in The Linguistic Turn: Recent Essays in Philosophical Method, ed. by Richard Rorty.
- "Imagination and Perception" in Experience and Theory, ed. L. Foster and J.W. Swanson (Amherst: University of Massachusetts Press, 1970)
- "Categories" in Ryle: A Collection of Critical essays, ed. O.P. Wood and G. Pitcher, (New York: Doubleday, 1970)
- "The Asymmetry of Subjects and Predicates" in Language, Belief and Metaphysics, ed. H.E. Kiefer and M.K. Munitz (New York: New York University Press, 1970)
- "Self-Reference, Contradiction and Content-Parasitic Predicates" (Indian review of Philosophy, 1972)
- "Different Conceptions of Analytical Philosophy" (Tijdschrift voor Filosofie, 1973)
- "Austin and 'Locutionary Meaning'" in Essays on J.L. Austin, ed. I Berlin (Oxford: Clarendon Press, 1973)
- "On Understanding the Structure of One's Language" in Freedom and Resentment and Other Essays
- "Positions for Quantifiers" in Semantics and Philosophy, ed. M.K. Munitz and P.K. Unger (New York: New York University Press, 1974)
- "Does Knowledge Have Foundations?" (Conocimiento y Creencia, 1974), reprinted in Philosophical Writings (2011)
- "Semantics, Logic and Ontology" (Neue Häfte für Philosophie, 1975)
- "Knowledge and Truth" (Indian Philosophical Quarterly, Vol. 3, No. 3, 1976), reprinted in Philosophical Writings (2011)
- "Entity and Identity" in Contemporary British Philosophy Fourth Series, ed. H.D. Lewis (London: Allen and Unwin, 1976)
- "Scruton and Wright on Anti-Realism" (Proceedings of the Aristotelian Society, Vol. 77, 1976)
- "May Bes and Might Have Beens" in Meaning and Use, ed. A. Margalit (London: Reidel, 1979)
- "Perception and its Objects" in Perception and Identity: Essays Presented to A.J. Ayer, ed. G.F. Macdonald (London: Macmillan, 1979)
- "Universals" (Midwest Studies in Philosophy, 1979)
- "Belief, Reference and Quantification" (Monist, 1980)
- "P.F. Strawson Replies" in Philosophical Subjects Presented to P.F. Strawson, ed. Zak Van Straaten (Oxford: Clarendon Press, 1980)
- "Comments and Reples" (Philosophia, Vol. 10, 1981)
- "Logical Form and Logical Constants" in Logical Form, Predication and Ontology, ed. P.K. Sen (India: Macmillan, 1982)
- "Liberty and Necessity" in Spinoza, His Thought & Work, ed. Nathan Rotenstreich and Norma Schneider (Jerusalem: The Israel Academy of Sciences and Humanities, 1983), reprinted in Analysis and Metaphysics (1992)
- "Causation and Explanation" in Essays on Davidson, ed. Bruce Vermazen and J. Hintikka (Oxford: Oxford University Press, 1985), reprinted in Analysis and Metaphysics (1992)
- "Direct Singular Reference: Intended Reference and Actual Reference" in Wo steht die Analytische Philosophie Heute?, 1986
- "Reference and its Roots" in The Philosophy of W.V. Quine. ed. L.E. Hahn and P.A. Schilpp (La Salle Ill.: Open Court, 1986)
- "Kant's Paralogisms: Self Consciousness and the 'Outside Observer'" in Theorie der Subjektivität, ed. K. Cramer, F. Fulda, R.-P. Hortsmann, U. Poshast (Frankfurt am Main: Suhrkamp, 1987)
- "Concepts and Properties, or Predication and Copulation" (Philosophical Quarterly, Vol. 37, 1987)
- "Kant's New Foundations of Metaphysics" in Metaphysik nach Kant, ed. Dieter Henrich and R.-P. Horstmann (Stuttgart: Klett Cotta, 1988)
- "Ma Philosophie: son développement, son thème central et sa nature générale" (Revue de thėologie et de philosophie, Vol. 120, 1988)
- "Sensibility, Understanding and the Doctrine of Synthesis: Comments on D. Henrich and P. Guyer" in Kant's Transcendental Deductions, ed. E. Forster (Stanford: Stanford University Press, 1989)
- "Two Conceptions of Philosophy" in Perspectives on Quine, ed. Robert Barrett and Roger Gibson (Oxford: Blackwell, 1990)
- "The Incoherence of Empiricism" (Proceedings of the Aristotelian Society, Supp. Vol. 66, 1992)
- "Comments on Some Aspects of Peter Unger's Identity, Consciousness and Value (Philosophy and Phenomenological Research, Vol. 42, 1992)
- "Echoes of Kant" (Times Literary Supplement, 1992, "The State of Philosophy")
- "Replies" in Ensayos sobre Strawson, ed. Carlos E. Carosi (Montevideo: Universidad de la Republica, 1992)
- "Knowing From Words" in Knowing From Words, ed. B. K. Matilal and A. Chakrabati (Dordrecht: Kluwer Academic Publishers, 1992)
- "My Philosophy" and "Replies" to critics in The Philosophy of P.F. Strawson, ed. P.K. Sen and R.K. Verma (New Delhi: Indian Council of Philosophical Research, 1994)
- "Individuals" in Philosophical Problems Today, Vol. 1, ed. G. Floistad (Dordrecht: Kluwer Academic Publishers, 1994)
- "The Problem of Realism and the A Priori" in Kant and Contemporary Epistemology, ed. Paolo Parrini (Dordrecht: Kluwer Academic Publishers, 1994)
- "Introduction", "Kant on Substance" and "Meaning and Context" in Entity and Identity (Oxford: Oxford University Press, 1997)
