= Martin Davies (philosopher) =

British philosopher and epistemologist

Martin Davies FASSA FAHA (born 1950) is a British philosopher who is Wilde Professor of Mental Philosophy Emeritus at the University of Oxford and Fellow of Corpus Christi College, Oxford where he taught from 2006 until 2017. He works in philosophy of mind, philosophy of language, epistemology and philosophy of psychology and cognitive science.

== Education and career ==
Davies was an undergraduate at Monash University and then earned B.Phil. and D.Phil. degrees at Oxford University, working with Gareth Evans, Christopher Peacocke and Dana Scott. He taught at the University of Essex, Birkbeck College, London, and was Wilde Reader in Mental Philosophy at Oxford from 1993 to 2000. He then took up a Professorship at the Australian National University before returning to Oxford in 2006 as the Wilde Professor. He retired from that position in 2017.

He is an elected Fellow of both the Australian Academy of the Humanities and the Academy of the Social Sciences in Australia.

== Selected publications ==
- (1980) "Two notions of necessity," Philosophical Studies 38: 1–30 (with Lloyd Humberstone).
- (1981) "Meaning, structure, and understanding," Synthese 48: 135–161.
- (1987) "Tacit knowledge and semantic theory: Can a five per cent difference matter?" Mind 96: 441–462.
- (1991) "Individualism and perceptual content," Mind 100: 461–484.
- (1995) "Consciousness and the varieties of aboutness," in C. Macdonald & G. Maconald (eds), Philosophy of Psychology: Debates on Psychological Explanation (Oxford: Blackwell), 356–392.
- (1997) "Externalism and experience," in N. Block, O. Flanagan & G. Güzeldere (eds), The Nature of Consciousness (Cambridge, MA: MIT Press), 309–327.
- (2000) "Externalism and armchair knowledge," in P. Boghossian & C. Peacocke (eds), New Essays on the A Priori (Oxford: Oxford University Press), 384–414.
- (2004) "Epistemic entitlement, warrant transmission, and easy knowledge," Aristotelian Society Supplementary Volume 78: 213–245
- (2005) "Cognitive science," in F. Jackson & M. Smith (eds.), The Oxford Handbook of Contemporary Philosophy (Oxford: Oxford University Press), 358–394.
- (2010) "Double dissociation: understanding its role in cognitive neuropsychology," Mind and Language 25: 500–540.
