= Philosophy of psychiatry =

Philosophical questions relating to psychiatry and mental illness

The philosophy of psychiatry explores philosophical questions relating to psychiatry and mental illness. The philosopher of science and medicine Dominic Murphy identifies three areas of exploration in the philosophy of psychiatry. The first concerns the examination of psychiatry as a science, using the tools of the philosophy of science more broadly. The second entails the examination of the concepts employed in discussion of mental illness, including the experience of mental illness, and the normative questions it raises. The third area concerns the links and discontinuities between the philosophy of mind and psychopathology.

== See also ==
- Philosophy of psychology
