= Wilde Professor of Mental Philosophy =

The Wilde Professorship of Mental Philosophy is a chair in philosophy at the University of Oxford. Its holder is elected to a Fellowship of Corpus Christi College.

The position was initially established in 1898 as a readership by an endowment from the engineer Henry Wilde who endowed many learned institutions including, in 1895, the Manchester Literary & Philosophical Society enabling them to present the Dalton Medal for Science or Literature eminence. The first Wilde Readers were the notable psychologists George Stout, William McDougall and William Brown.The post was converted to a professorship in 2000, on the recommendation of the Literae Humaniores Board and with the concurrence of the General Board.

According to the University's statutes: "The Wilde Professor shall lecture and give instruction in Mental Philosophy, and shall from time to time lecture on the more theoretical aspects of Psychology."

== Wilde Professors ==
- 2000–2006: John Campbell, later Willis S. and Marion Slusser Professor of Philosophy at the University of California, Berkeley
- 2006–2016: Martin Davies
- 2018–present: Michael Gerard Fitzgerald Martin
