= J. M. Hinton (philosopher) =

British philosopher (1923-2000)

John Michael Hinton (1923 – 3 February 2000) was a British philosopher. He was a lecturer at the University of Oxford from 1958 and a fellow of Worcester College, Oxford, from 1960. He was Cowling Visiting Professor at Carleton College in 1978-79. He was previously a lecturer at Victoria University College.

Hinton is widely cited as the first modern proponent of the disjunctive theory of perception. This view is set out in his 1973 book Experiences: An Inquiry Into Some Ambiguities, and in some papers dating as far back as 1966.

== Bibliography ==
- J. M. Hinton "Seeing and Causes", Philosophy, Oct 1966
- J. M. Hinton "Visual Experiences", Mind, Vol lxxvi, No 302, April 1967, pp. 217–227
- J. M. Hinton (1967) "Experiences" Philosophical Quarterly 17 (66):1-13.
- J. Michael Hinton "Perception and Identification", Philosophical Review 76, October 1967, pp. 421–435.
- I. C. Hinckfuss "J.M. Hinton on Visual Experiences" Mind 79 April 1970 pp. 278–280.
- J. M.Hinton "A Reaction to Radical Philosophy", Radical Philosophy 2, Summer 1972, p. 24
- J. M. Hinton "Visual Experiences: A Reply to I.C. Hinckfuss" Mind 82 (April 1973) pp. 278–279.
- J. M. Hinton Experiences (1973), Clarendon Press, Oxford
- J. Michael Hinton "This is Visual Sensation" in Renford Bambrough (ed.) "Wisdom: Twelve Essays", Oxford Blackwell, 1974.
- J. M. Hinton "Phenomenological Specimenism", Analysis Vol. 40 No.1, Jan 1980, pp. 37–41
- J. M. Hinton "Are They Class-names?", Philosophy 57, 1982, pp. 27–50
- Paul Snowdon, "Hinton and the Origins of Disjunctivism", in "Disjunctivism: Perception, Action, Knowledge" ed. by Adrian Haddock and Fiona Macpherson, Oxford: OUP, 2008, pp. 35–56.
