= Philosophy of psychology =

Theoretical foundations of modern psychology

Philosophy of psychology is concerned with the history and foundations of psychology. It deals with both epistemological and ontological issues and shares interests with other fields, including philosophy of mind and theoretical psychology. Philosophical and theoretical psychology are intimately tied and are therefore sometimes used interchangeably or used together. However, philosophy of psychology relies more on debates general to philosophy and on philosophical methods, whereas theoretical psychology draws on multiple areas.

== Epistemology ==
Some of the issues studied by the philosophy of psychology are epistemological concerns about the methodology of psychological investigation. For example:

- What constitutes a psychological explanation?
- What is the most appropriate methodology for psychology: mentalism, behaviorism, or a compromise?
- Are self-reports a reliable data-gathering method?
- What conclusions can be drawn from null hypothesis tests?
- Can first-person experiences (emotions, desires, beliefs, etc.) be measured objectively?

== Ontology ==
Philosophers of psychology also concern themselves with ontological issues, like:

- Can psychology be theoretically reduced to neuroscience?
- What are psychological phenomena?
- What is the relationship between subjectivity and objectivity in psychology?

== Ethics ==
Philosophers of psychology consider ethical questions, including:

- The possibilities for the ethical practice of psychology given its theoretical commitments
- The intersections of ethics and justice with the clinical practice of psychology
- The implicit and explicit ethical stances of professional psychology
- The history of ethical decisions by psychological institutions such as the APA

== Relations to other fields ==
Philosophy of psychology also closely monitors contemporary work conducted in cognitive neuroscience, cognitive psychology, and artificial intelligence, for example questioning whether psychological phenomena can be explained using the methods of neuroscience, evolutionary theory, and computational modeling, respectively. Although these are all closely related fields, some concerns still arise about the appropriateness of importing their methods into psychology. Some such concerns are whether psychology, as the study of individuals as information processing systems (see Donald Broadbent), is autonomous from what happens in the brain (even if psychologists largely agree that the brain in some sense causes behavior (see supervenience)); whether the mind is "hard-wired" enough for evolutionary investigations to be fruitful; and whether computational models can do anything more than offer possible implementations of cognitive theories that tell us nothing about the mind (Fodor & Pylyshyn 1988).

Related to the philosophy of psychology are philosophical and epistemological inquiries about clinical psychiatry and psychopathology. Philosophy of psychiatry is mainly concerned with the role of values in psychiatry: derived from philosophical value theory and phenomenology, values-based practice is aimed at improving and humanizing clinical decision-making in the highly complex environment of mental health care. Philosophy of psychopathology is mainly involved in the epistemological reflection about the implicit philosophical foundations of psychiatric classification and evidence-based psychiatry. Its aim is to unveil the constructive activity underlying the description of mental phenomena.

== Main areas ==
Different schools and systems of psychology represent approaches to psychological problems, which are often based on different philosophies of consciousness.

Functional psychology

Functionalism treats the psyche as derived from the activity of external stimuli, deprived of its essential autonomy, denying free will, which influenced behaviourism later on; one of the founders of functionalism was James, also close to pragmatism, where human action is put before questions and doubts about the nature of the world and man himself.

Psychoanalysis

Freud's doctrine, called Metapsychology, was to give the human self greater freedom from instinctive and irrational desires in a dialogue with a psychologist through analysis of the unconscious. Later the psychoanalytic movement split, part of it treating psychoanalysis as a practice of working with archetypes (analytical psychology), part criticising the social limitations of the unconscious (Freudo-Marxism), and later Lacan's structural psychoanalysis, which interpreted the unconscious as a language.

Phenomenological psychology

Edmund Husserl rejected the physicalism of most of the psychological teachings of his time and began to understand consciousness as the only reality accessible to reliable cognition. His disciple Heidegger added to this the assertion of the fundamental finitude of man and the threat of a loss of authenticity in the technical world, and thus laid the foundation for existential psychology.

Structuralism

The recognised creator of psychology as a science, Wilhelm Wundt, described the primordial structures of the psyche that determine perception and behaviour, but faced the problem of the impossibility of direct access to these structures and the vagueness of their description.
