= Patrick Suppes =

American philosopher

- Born: Patrick Colonel Suppes; March 17, 1922; Tulsa, Oklahoma, US
- Died: November 17, 2014 (aged 92); Stanford, California, US
- Awards: National Medal of Science (1990); Lauener Prize (2004)

Education
- Education: University of Chicago (B.S., 1943); Columbia University (Ph.D., 1950)
- Doctoral advisor: Ernest Nagel

Philosophical work
- Era: 20th-century philosophy
- Region: Western philosophy
- School: Analytic philosophy Scientific structuralism Stanford school
- Doctoral students: Thomas W. Malone; Paul W. Holland
- Main interests: Philosophy of science Foundations of quantum mechanics Foundations of neuroscience Foundations of probability and measurement Theories of learning
- Notable ideas: Theory structures as set-theoretic predicates Semantic view of theories Suppes–Lemmon notation

Patrick Colonel Suppes (/ˈsuːpiːz/; March 17, 1922 – November 17, 2014) was an American philosopher who made significant contributions to philosophy of science, the theory of measurement, the foundations of quantum mechanics, decision theory, psychology and educational technology. He was the Lucie Stern Professor of Philosophy Emeritus at Stanford University and until January 2010 was the Director of the Education Program for Gifted Youth also at Stanford.

== Early life and career ==
Suppes was born on March 17, 1922, in Tulsa, Oklahoma. He grew up as an only child, later with a half-brother George nearly 20 years his junior who was born in 1943 after Patrick had entered the army. His grandfather, C. E. Suppes, had moved to Oklahoma from Ohio. Suppes' father and grandfather were independent oil men. His mother died when he was a young boy. He was raised by his stepmother, who married his father when he was almost six years old. His parents did not have much formal education.

Suppes began college at the University of Oklahoma in 1939, but transferred to the University of Chicago in his second year, citing boredom with intellectual life in Oklahoma as his primary motivation. In his third year, at the insistence of his family, Suppes attended the University of Tulsa, majoring in physics, before entering the Army Reserves in 1942. In 1943 he returned to the University of Chicago and graduated with a B.S. in meteorology, and was stationed shortly thereafter at the Solomon Islands to serve during World War II.

Suppes was discharged from the Army Air Force in 1946. In January 1947 he entered Columbia University as a graduate student in philosophy as a student of Ernest Nagel and received a PhD in 1950. In 1952 he went to Stanford University, and from 1959 to 1992 he was the director of the Institute for Mathematical Studies in the Social Sciences (IMSSS). He subsequently became the Lucie Stern Professor of Philosophy, emeritus, at Stanford.

== Work ==
=== Computer-aided learning ===
In the 1960s Suppes and Richard C. Atkinson (the future president of the University of California) conducted experiments in using computers to teach math and reading to school children in the Palo Alto area. Stanford's Education Program for Gifted Youth and Computer Curriculum Corporation (CCC, now named Pearson Education Technologies) are indirect descendants of those early experiments. At Stanford, Suppes was instrumental in encouraging the development of high-technology companies that were springing up in the field of educational software up into the 1990s (such as Bien Logic founded by mathematician Frederic Bien in 1993).

One computer used in Suppes and Atkinson's Computer-assisted Instruction (CAI) experiments was the specialized IBM 1500 Instructional System. Seeded by a research grant in 1964 from the U.S. Department of Education to the Institute for Mathematical Studies in the Social Sciences at Stanford University, the IBM 1500 CAI system was initially prototyped at the Brentwood Elementary School (Ravenswood City School District) in East Palo Alto, California by Suppes. The students first used the system in 1966.

Suppes' Dial-a-Drill program was a touchtone phone interface for CAI. Ten schools around Manhattan were involved in the program which delivered three lessons per week by telephone. Dial-a-Drill adjusted the routine for students who answered two questions incorrectly. The system went online in March 1969. Touchtone telephones were installed in the homes of children participating in the program. Field workers educated parents on the benefits of the program and collected feedback.

=== Decision theory ===
During the 1950s and 1960s Suppes collaborated with Donald Davidson on decision theory, at Stanford. Their initial work followed lines of thinking which had been anticipated in 1926 by Frank P. Ramsey, and involved experimental testing of their theories, culminating in the 1957 monograph Decision Making: An Experimental Approach. Such commentators as Kirk Ludwig trace the origins of Davidson's theory of radical interpretation to his formative work with Suppes.

== Awards and honors ==
- He was elected to the American Academy of Arts and Sciences in 1968.
- In 1971 he was elected as a Permanent Member of the Institut international de philosophie.
- In 1978 he was elected as a member of the National Academy of Sciences for his work on mathematical psychology.
- On November 13, 1990, President George H. W. Bush awarded Suppes with the President's National Medal of Science for work in Behavioral and Social Science.
- He was elected to the American Philosophical Society in 1991.
- In 1994 he was inducted as a Fellow of the Association for Computing Machinery. He is the laureate of the 2003 Lakatos Award for his contributions to the philosophy of science.
- He was a member of the Norwegian Academy of Science and Letters.
- In 2012, he was given the first ever Software and Information Industry Association Lifetime Achievement Award

== Works ==
- Arrow, Kenneth J.; Karlin, Samuel; Suppes, Patrick, eds. (1970) [1960]. Mathematical models in the social sciences, 1959: Proceedings of the first Stanford symposium. Stanford, California: Stanford University Press. ISBN 978-0-8047-0021-4.

Including: Suppes, Patrick (1960), Stimulus-sampling theory for a continuum of response, pp. 348–363.

- Suppes, Patrick (1972 [1960]). Axiomatic Set Theory. Dover. Spanish translation by H. A. Castillo, Teoria Axiomatica de Conjuntos.
- Suppes, Patrick (1984). Probabilistic Metaphysics, Blackwell Pub; Reprint edition (October 1986)
- Humphreys, P., ed. (1994). Patrick Suppes: Scientific Philosopher, Synthese Library (Springer-Verlag).
  - Vol. 1: Probability and Probabilistic Causality.
  - Vol. 2: Philosophy of Physics, Theory Structure and Measurement, and Action Theory.
- Suppes, Patrick (1999) (1957). Introduction to Logic. Dover. Spanish translation by G. A. Carrasco, Introduccion a la logica simbolica. Chinese translation by Fu-Tseng Liu.
- Suppes, Patrick (2002). Representation and Invariance of Scientific Structures. CSLI (distributed by the University of Chicago Press).
- Suppes, Patrick; Hill, Shirley (2002) (1964). A First Course in Mathematical Logic. Dover. Spanish translation.
- Suppes, Patrick; Luce, R. Duncan; Krantz, David; Tversky, Amos (2007) (1972). Foundations of Measurement, Vols. 1–3. Dover.

== See also ==
- American philosophy
- List of American philosophers

Educational offices
| Preceded by Robert L. Ebel | President of the American Educational Research Association; 1973–1974 | Succeeded by Robert L. Thorndike |
Academic offices
| Preceded by Jaakko Hintikka | President of the DLMPST/IUHPST; 1975–1979 | Succeeded by Jerzy Łoś |
