= James Giles (philosopher) =

Canadian philosopher and psychologist

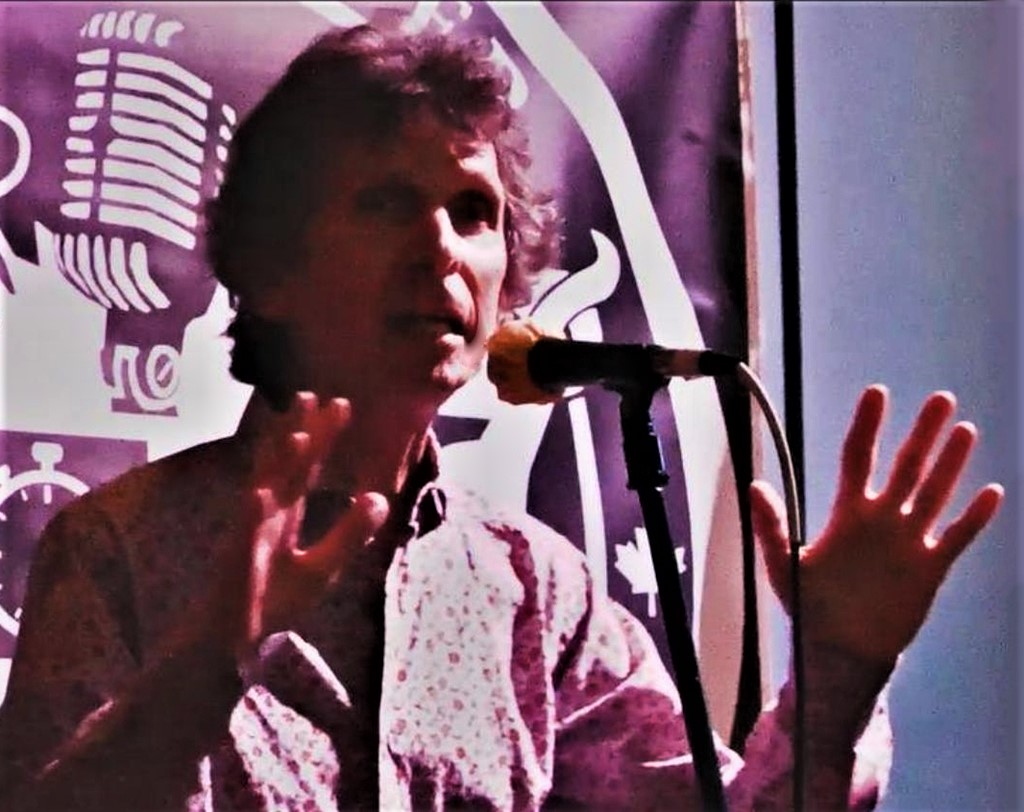
- Giles in 2023 at Vancouver Poetry House
- Born: 1958 (age 67–68); Vancouver, British Columbia, Canada

Education
- Education: University of British Columbia University of Edinburgh

Philosophical work
- Era: Contemporary philosophy
- Region: Western and Eastern philosophy
- School: Analytic philosophy
- Main interests: Metaphysics, Philosophy of mind, Philosophy of sex, Philosophy of love, Existential phenomenology, Evolutionary theory, Buddhist philosophy, Taoist philosophy, Social psychology
- Notable ideas: Constructed self-image, Vulnerability and care theory of love, Naked love theory of human evolution, Sexual desire as an existential need
- Website: james-giles.com

James Giles (born 1958) is a Canadian philosopher and psychologist. He has written about the philosophy of perception, personal identity and the self, mindfulness, Buddhist and Taoist philosophy, and has published theories of the evolution of human hairlessness, the nature of sexual desire, sexual attraction, and gender. His wide range of academic interests and often controversial views have earned him the title of "interdisciplinary maverick."

== Schooling and career ==
Giles was born in Vancouver, British Columbia, Canada, grew up in West Point Grey, and graduated from Point Grey Secondary School. He studied at the University of British Columbia (BA Hons, MA) and at the University of Edinburgh (PhD). In addition to teaching at UBC and Edinburgh, he has also taught at Aalborg University and the University of Copenhagen, Denmark; Hawaii College of Kansai University, Japan; the University of Guam; and La Trobe University, Australia. As of 2021 Giles is a Panel Tutor in Philosophy at the Institute of Continuing Education, University of Cambridge.

In addition to his academic research, Giles has also written for several media, including Monitor on Psychology, The Copenhagen Post, The Ottawa Citizen, Science of Relationships, The Vancouver Sun, Daily Pacific News, and The Conversation.

== Notable ideas ==
=== No-self theory ===
Giles takes David Hume's notion of personal identity being a fiction and develops it in terms of Buddhist accounts of no-self and theories of language. Giles points out that many theories of personal identity are reductive theories. They try to reduce the idea of personal identity to elements such as memory, personality, or bodily continuity. The no-self theory, however, is an eliminative theory. That is, it eliminates the idea of personal identity altogether. He allows that we are sometimes aware of psychological and emotional states that seem to give immediate awareness of self. He argues, however, that what we are aware of at these times is not a persisting self, but rather a "constructed or condensed self-image", namely "a composite of related images and meanings referring to how I see myself at that moment". These moments, however, make only rare appearances in consciousness. Giles is a major proponent of the no-self theory. His contributions have been anthologized, received extensive discussion in such diverse fields as philosophy, psychology, history, and communication, and called one of the best comparative studies of Hume and Buddhist philosophy. Giles has also argued for the role of the no-self theory in contemporary mindfulness-based interventions. His original account of the place of the no-self theory here has been widely cited and discussed.

=== Metaphysics of awareness ===
In a radical interpretation of early Taoist philosophy, Giles argues that the Tao has little to do with mysticism or cosmology. Rather, it refers to human awareness. The Taoist accounts of return and non-action, says Giles, provide us with insights into the nature of awareness and how meditative states can co-exist within and thus underpin everyday awareness. This works through what he calls the double return, or a back and forth of stillness and constant flow of awareness. Giles compares this view of awareness with ancient Greek, Buddhist, existentialist, and analytic accounts of philosophy of mind in an "extension of the global philosophical palette".

=== Nature of sexual desire ===
Giles first published his theory of sexual desire in an article entitled "A Theory of Love and Sexual Desire" in 1994. This theory was developed in The Nature of Sexual Desire in 2003. Sexologists usually account for sexual desire either in terms of social constructionism or as a biological characteristic essential to reproduction. Giles rejects both these views, and attempts to show by a phenomenological approach that sexual desire is an existential need rooted in the human condition, based on a feeling of incompleteness from the experience of one's own gender as a form of disequilibrium. The desired person's gender, whether the same or different from one's own gender, is seen as completing one's own gender. As Crockett says, "The core of Giles' argument with regard to the relationship between gender and sexuality is that (gendered) sexual orientation is essential to the experience of sexual desire." Although the theory shows similarities to earlier theories such as those of Thomas Nagel on sexual perversion, or of Aristophanes on romantic love in Plato's Symposium, Giles' core thesis is quite distinct. This is the idea that sexual desire is just the desire for mutual vulnerability and care in the form of baring and caressing. Mutual Baring and caressing are thus the true objects of sexual desire. On Giles' account, says Palm,

sexual interaction opens up as an arena of exploration of this traumatic instance of both being in control of and being exposed to the other. And the good thing about this sexual arena is that, it seems to situate the interplay between control and vulnerability in an arousing context of care, so that sexual interaction provides a safe form for the exploration of these threatening dimensions of existence.

Giles' book on sexual desire has been extensively discussed and reviewed in journals from an array of different disciplines. Giles is also known for both his critique of the attempt to pathologize high levels of sexual behaviour and his rejection of the idea that sexual orientation is socially constructed.

=== Vulnerability and care theory of love ===
The vulnerability and care theory of love was put forward by Giles in his article, "A Theory of Love and Sexual Desire" (1994) and later developed in his book The Nature of Sexual Desire (2003). Giles also presents his theory in a TEDx Talk. According to Giles, romantic love is a complex of reciprocal desires for mutual vulnerability and care. One desires to be vulnerable before the beloved in order that the beloved may show care. At the same time one desires that the beloved be vulnerable before oneself in order that one may care for her or him. Although vulnerability has often been thought to be an unavoidable and perhaps unwanted consequence of love, Giles sees it as being an essential object of the desires of love. It is also because of these desires that being in love implies having sexual desire towards the beloved. For sexual desire is a desire for a type of vulnerability and care, namely, the physical vulnerability of baring and the physical care of caressing. This does not mean, however, that sexual desire must imply being in love. Sexual desire is not so all-encompassing as romantic desire. His theory of romantic love has been reviewed in numerous journals and discussed by scholars Dr. Ruth, in her textbook Human Sexuality: a Psychosocial Perspective (2002), Dr. Barbara Keesling, in her book Sexual Pleasure: Reaching New Heights of Sexual Arousal (2005), and Natasha McKeever in Romantic Love and Monogamy: A Philosophical Exploration (2014).

=== Sexual attraction ===
In Sexual Attraction: The Psychology of Allure, Giles claims that the experience of sexual attraction has been ignored by scholars or confused with sexual desire. While sexual desire is an urge that is experienced as coming from within, sexual attraction is felt to have its locus in the attractive person. Giles further distinguishes sexual attraction from physical attraction, which can be seen simply as a "subjective experience of positive affect toward a specific individual, based on an assessment of their physical attractiveness" As Zsok et al. point out, this is different from Giles' account of the experience of sexual attraction, which has the following three components:

- feeling drawn towards the attractive person, much like being drawn by a magnetic quality
- a sense of helplessness in being drawn towards the person
- sexual fantasies about erotic interaction with the person.

This shows how sexual attraction can exist independently of any sexual behaviours. This assists in the study of types of sexual attraction that do not necessarily express themselves in sexual behaviour.

=== Naked love theory ===
Giles published his "naked love theory" of human hairlessness in 2010, He rejects the view that human hairlessness evolved because of the need for thermoregulation when we became hunters and ran after prey. He argues that ancestral women would have been continually pregnant, breast-feeding, or tending to small children and so would not have been commonly running after prey. Yet, it is women who are more hairless than men. This suggests that hairlessness began with women and was passed on to men. Giles postulates that hairlessness in human beings evolved as a result of the pleasure of skin-to-skin contact between mother and child, and thus ultimately as a consequence of bipedalism. With all other primates, the infant clings to the mother's fur with its hands and feet. However, with the advent of bipedalism, ancestral human infants lost the ability to cling to their mothers with their feet, which became adapted for walking rather than grasping. Ancestral mothers who were bipedal could compensate for this by holding their infants with their newly freed arms. But carrying an infant is much work. Anything that motivated the mother to carry her infant would thus have been selected for. Naked skin was one such adaptation. Mothers with a hairless mutation, who passed this on to their infants, would have been motivated to hold the infant by the sensual pleasure of skin-to-skin contact. This is the basis of what Giles calls maternal selection for hairless infants. This selection process would have been further driven by sexual selection for hairless sex partners, sex partners who would remind the individual of the sensual contact of infancy. The naked love theory thus explains why women and children are more hairless that adult males. For hairlessness has its origins in the mother-child relationship. According to Giles, naked skin is a precondition for the appearance of romantic love,

It might be thought that a problem with this theory concerns the division of labor in prehistoric society as well as modern hunter-gatherer societies. Male and female hunters, for example, are known to have contributed to hunting (including large animals) more than traditionally believed. Nevertheless, pregnant or nursing ancestral women with engorged breasts would still have been incapable of running over long distances. Further, sports and running injuries are far more prevalent among women than men, even if a woman is not pregnant or nursing. Ankle sprain, shoulder troubles, knee injuries, stress fractures, plantar fasciitis, and susceptibility to concussions, to name but a few, are much more common in women athletes than in men. The ACL knee injury, for example, is six times more common in women. In addition, the higher rate of injuries in women seems due to the basic differences between men and women's bodies. Because of all this, it is unlikely that ancestral women lost their body hair, and did so to higher degree than men, because of the requirements for aerobic endurance.

== Books ==
- The Way of Awareness in Daoist Philosophy, St. Petersberg, Florida: Three Pines Press, 2020.
- Sexual Essays: Gender, Desire, and Nakedness, Lanham: Hamilton Books, 2017.
- Sexual Attraction: The Psychology of Allure, Santa Barbara: ABC-Clio, 2015.
- The Shell of When, Windways Press/Lulu.com, 2011.
- Kierkegaard and Japanese Thought (Ed.), Basingstoke, UK and New York: Palgrave Macmillan, 2008.
- The Nature of Sexual Desire, Connecticut: Praeger, 2003 / Lanham; University Press of America, 2008.
- Kierkegaard and Freedom (Ed.), Basingstoke, UK and New York: Palgrave Macmillan, 2000.
- French Existentialism: Consciousness, Ethics, and Relations with Others (Ed.), Amsterdam and Atlanta : Rodopi, 1999.
- No Self to be Found: The Search for Personal Identity, Lanham: University Press of America, 1997.
- A Study in Phenomenalism, Aalborg, Denmark: Aalborg University, 1994.

== See also ==
- Phenomenalism
