= Open-mindedness =

Receptiveness to new ideas

Open-mindedness is receptiveness to new ideas. Open-mindedness relates to the way in which people approach the views and knowledge of others. Jason Baehr defines an open-minded person as one who "characteristically moves beyond or temporarily sets aside his own doxastic commitments in order to give a fair and impartial hearing to the intellectual opposition". Jack Kwong's definition sees open-mindedness as the "willingness to take a novel viewpoint seriously".

According to Wayne Riggs, open-mindedness springs from an awareness of the inherent fallibility of one's beliefs; hence, open-minded individuals are more inclined to listen to, and seriously consider, alternative viewpoints.

There are various scales for the measurement of open-mindedness. Harding and Hare argued that schools should emphasize open-mindedness more than relativism in their science instruction, because the scientific community does not embrace a relativistic way of thinking.

Among other things, the critical attitude involves an open-minded outlook with respect to one's beliefs.

Open-mindedness is generally considered an important personal attribute for effective participation in management teams and other groups. Open-mindedness is usually encouraged in group settings, within different cultures and new environments.

According to David DiSalvo, closed-mindedness, or an unwillingness to consider new ideas, can result from the brain's natural dislike for ambiguity. According to this view, the brain has a "search and destroy" relationship with ambiguity and evidence contradictory to people's current beliefs tends to make them uncomfortable by introducing such ambiguity. Research confirms that belief-discrepant-closed-minded persons have less tolerance for cognitive inconsistency.

Virtues contrasting with open-mindedness include steadfastness, loyalty, and fundamentalism.

== Open-mindedness in American political parties ==
Democrats and Republicans differ in how they describe themselves in 2024, according to a Pew poll. Three-fourths (75%) of Democrats describing themselves as open minded compared to half (54%) of Republicans while 44% of Republicans are skeptical of what experts say compared to 17% of Democrats. Additionally 71% of Republicans describe themselves as “respectful of authority” compared to 61% of Democrats with 58% of Republicans describing themselves as traditional while only 19% of Democrats describing that way. Of liberal Democrats, 87% of them describe themselves as open minded compared to 49% who identify as conservatives while 51% of conservatives being skeptical of experts compared to 14% of liberal Democrats.

== See also ==
- Belief perseverance – Maintenance of a belief despite new information that firmly contradicts it
- Filter bubble – Intellectual isolation through internet algorithms
- Openness to experience – Personality trait
- Rationality – Quality of being agreeable to reason
