= Herman Cappelen =

Norwegian philosopher (born 1967)

- Occupation: Chair Professor of Philosophy at the University of Hong Kong

Academic background
- Education: University of California, Berkeley
- Doctoral advisor: Charles Chihara, Stephen Neale, and John Searle

Academic work
- Discipline: Philosophy of Language, Philosophy of Artificial Intelligence, Conceptual Engineering, Metaphilosophy.
- Institutions: University of Hong Kong, University of Oslo, University of St. Andrews, University of Oxford, Vassar College.
- Website: hermancappelen.net

Herman Wright Cappelen (born 1967) is a Norwegian philosopher. He is currently the Chair Professor of Philosophy at the University of Hong Kong.

== Biography ==
Cappelen is the son of author and publisher Peder Wright Cappelen and actress Kari Simonsen. Cappelen received a BA in Philosophy, Politics, and Economics from the University of Oxford, Balliol College, in 1989. In 1996, Cappelen received his PhD from the University of California, Berkeley. The title of his dissertation was "The Metaphysics of Words and the Semantics of Quotation". His advisors were Charles Chihara, Stephen Neale, and John Searle.

== Academic career ==
Cappelen was previously a professor of philosophy at the University of Oslo and at the University of St Andrews in Scotland. He works primarily on philosophy of language and philosophical methodology and related areas in epistemology, philosophy of mind, and metaphysics. In 2013, he became editor of the journal Inquiry: An Interdisciplinary Journal Of Philosophy.

Since 2020, Cappelen has been Chair Professor of Philosophy at the University of Hong Kong. In Hong Kong, he is co-director of the AI&Humanity research center, and director of its MA in AI, Ethics, and Society. Prior to that, Cappelen was Professor at the University of Oslo, where he co-directed CSMN's ConceptLab. a project on conceptual engineering funded by a Toppforsk award from the Research Council of Norway. Prior to that, he was, since 2007, Professor and Arché chair at the University of St Andrews. He has previously held positions at Somerville College, Oxford, University of Oslo, and Vassar College. He has been the Director of the Arché Philosophical Research Centre and was co-investigator of two research projects funded by longterm AHRC grants: "Contextualism and Relativism" and "Intuitions and Philosophical Methodology". Cappelen was one of the original applicants for the research center Centre for the Study of Mind in Nature (Norwegian Centre of Excellence) at the University of Oslo. Cappelen has been a member of the Norwegian Academy of Science and Letters since 2008, a Permanent Member of the Institut International de philosophie, and a member of the Academia Europaea since 2018.

== Work ==
Cappelen's most influential work is the 2004 book, Insensitive Semantics (written with Ernest Lepore). The book defends a minimal role for context in semantics and advocates speech act pluralism.

Cappelen has argued that the role of intuition in Western analytic philosophy is overstated. His 2012 book, Philosophy without Intuitions, argues that intuition plays a minor role - or no role at all - in most modern philosophy, and the fear that intuition is widespread has been damaging. His claim that the role of intuitions is overstated is controversial, and has been hotly debated.

Along with Josh Dever, Cappelen has argued that the notion of perspective is unimportant for the philosophy of language, thought, and action. Their 2013 book The Inessential Indexical argues that the phenomena which, for example, John Perry and David Lewis think show the importance of indexical representation of the self and time can be accounted for using resources already available in the philosophy of language and thought.

Cappelen has also authored, or co-authored, important books on the debate between contextualists and relativists (Relativism and Monadic Truth, with John Hawthorne), and on quotation (Language Turned on Itself with Ernest Lepore). Some of his papers co-written with Ernest Lepore are collected in Liberating Content.

Cappelen, along with Josh Dever, wrote a series of textbooks on philosophy of language, Context and Communication (2016), Puzzles Of Reference (2018), and Bad Language (2019). Along with John Hawthorne and Tamar Gendler he coedited The Oxford Handbook Of Philosophical Methodology (2016).

In 2018, his monograph Fixing Language: An Essay On Conceptual Engineering was released. The first monograph on the topic, it surveys both historical and contemporary work on conceptual engineering, and presents a theory of its nature and limitations. With David Plunkett and Alexis Burgess he co-edited Conceptual Engineering and Conceptual Ethics (2020), a collection of papers on the topic of conceptual engineering.

Cappelen contributed to the analytic debate around philosophical progress with an influential paper in 2017. He argues that there is no evidence that there is more disagreement in philosophy than other sciences. He also argues that philosophy should not be compared to the natural but to the social sciences. He can be categorized as an "optimist" concerning philosophical progress.

His monograph Making AI Intelligible, co-written with Josh Dever, appeared in 2021, and his The Concept of Democracy appeared in 2023.

== Publications ==
Monographs:

- The Concept Of Democracy, Oxford University Press, 2023, ISBN 9780198886518
- Making AI Intelligible (with Josh Dever), Oxford University Press, 2021, ISBN 9780192894724
- Fixing Language: An Essay On Conceptual Engineering, Oxford University Press, 2018, ISBN 9780198814719
- The Inessential Indexical: On the Philosophical Insignificance of Perspective and the First Person (with Josh Dever), Oxford University Press, 2013, ISBN 978-0-19-968674-2
- Philosophy without Intuitions, Oxford University Press, 2012, ISBN 978-0-19-964486-5
- Relativism and Monadic Truth (with John Hawthorne), Oxford University Press, 2009, 978-0-19-956055-4
- Language Turned on Itself: The Semantics and Pragmatics of Metalinguistic Discourse (with Ernest Lepore), Oxford University Press, 2007, ISBN 978-0-19-923119-5
- Insensitive Semantics: A Defense of Semantic Minimalism and Speech Act Pluralism (with Ernest Lepore), Wiley-Blackwell, 2004, ISBN 978-1-4051-2675-5

Edited Volumes:

- Conceptual Engineering and Conceptual Ethics (with David Plunkett and Alexis Burgess), Oxford University Press, 2020, ISBN 9780198801856
- The Oxford Handbook of Philosophical Methodology (with Tamar Szabo Gendler and John Hawthorne), Oxford University Press, 2016, ISBN 9780199668779
- Assertion: New Philosophical Essays (with Jessica Brown), Oxford University Press, 2011, ISBN 978-0-19-957300-4

Textbooks:

- Bad Language (with Josh Dever), Oxford University Press, 2019, ISBN 9780198839644
- Puzzles of Reference (with Josh Dever), Oxford University Press, 2018 ISBN 9780198799849
- Context and Communication (with Josh Dever), Oxford University Press, 2016, ISBN 9780198733065

Collection of Papers:

- Liberating Content (with Ernie Lepore), Oxford University Press, 2015, ISBN 9780199641338
