= Rødtvet Church =

- Rødtvet kirke
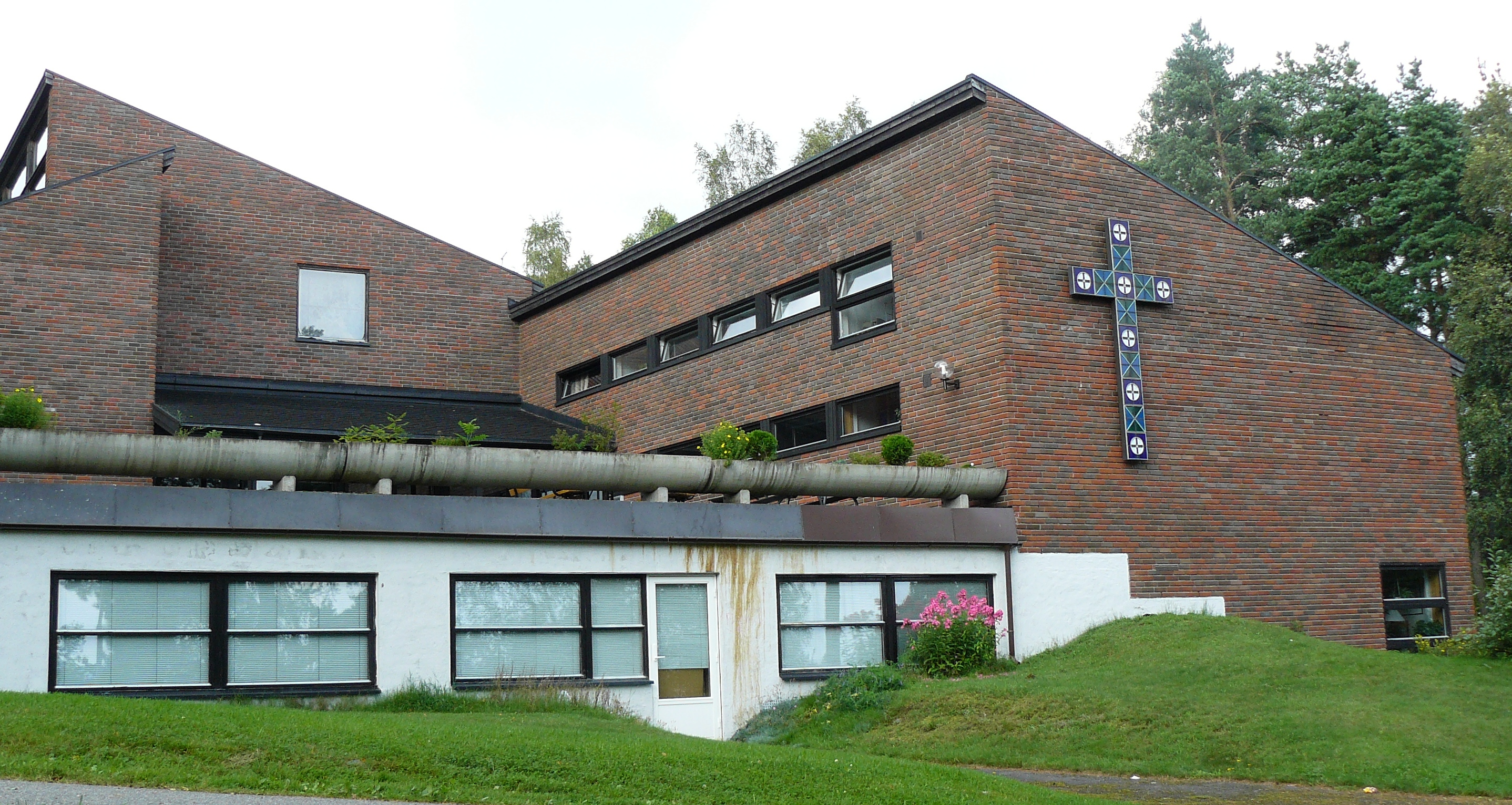
- Rødtvet Church
- 59°57′26″N 10°52′7″E
- Location: Martin Strandlis vei 9, Rødtvet, Oslo,
- Country: Norway
- Denomination: Church of Norway
- Churchmanship: Evangelical Lutheran
- Website: kirken.no

History
- Status: Parish church
- Consecrated: 1978

Architecture
- Functional status: Active

Specifications
- Capacity: 600
- Materials: Brick

Administration
- Diocese: Diocese of Oslo
- Deanery: Østre Aker
- Parish: Grorud

Rødtvet Church is a church center in Oslo, Norway. There is a youth center, an elderly center, a kindergarten and offices. In addition to the church room, there are two congregation halls. The facades of the church building are in brick. On one of the exterior walls hangs a large ceramic cross, created by Konrad Galaaen.

The altarpiece in the church room, where the cross is also the main motif, was painted by Jens Johannessen. A stained glass was done by Veslemøy Nystedt Stoltenberg. Another stained glass window in the south wall of the gallery depicting the battle of Jesus in Gethsemane dates back to 1928, and was created by E. Kristiansen. The place to light candles and a light bulb was created Torbjørn Grue in 2005. A wall textile and a white antependium was created by Turid Svarstad Flø in 2011. The church organ has 18 voices and was built at J. H. Jørgensen's Orgelfabrikk 1979–80.

There are two church bells from Olsen Nauen Bell Foundry from 1978 as well as a carillon with 12 bells in the separate bell tower.

Rødtvet Church is listed by the Norwegian Directorate for Cultural Heritage.

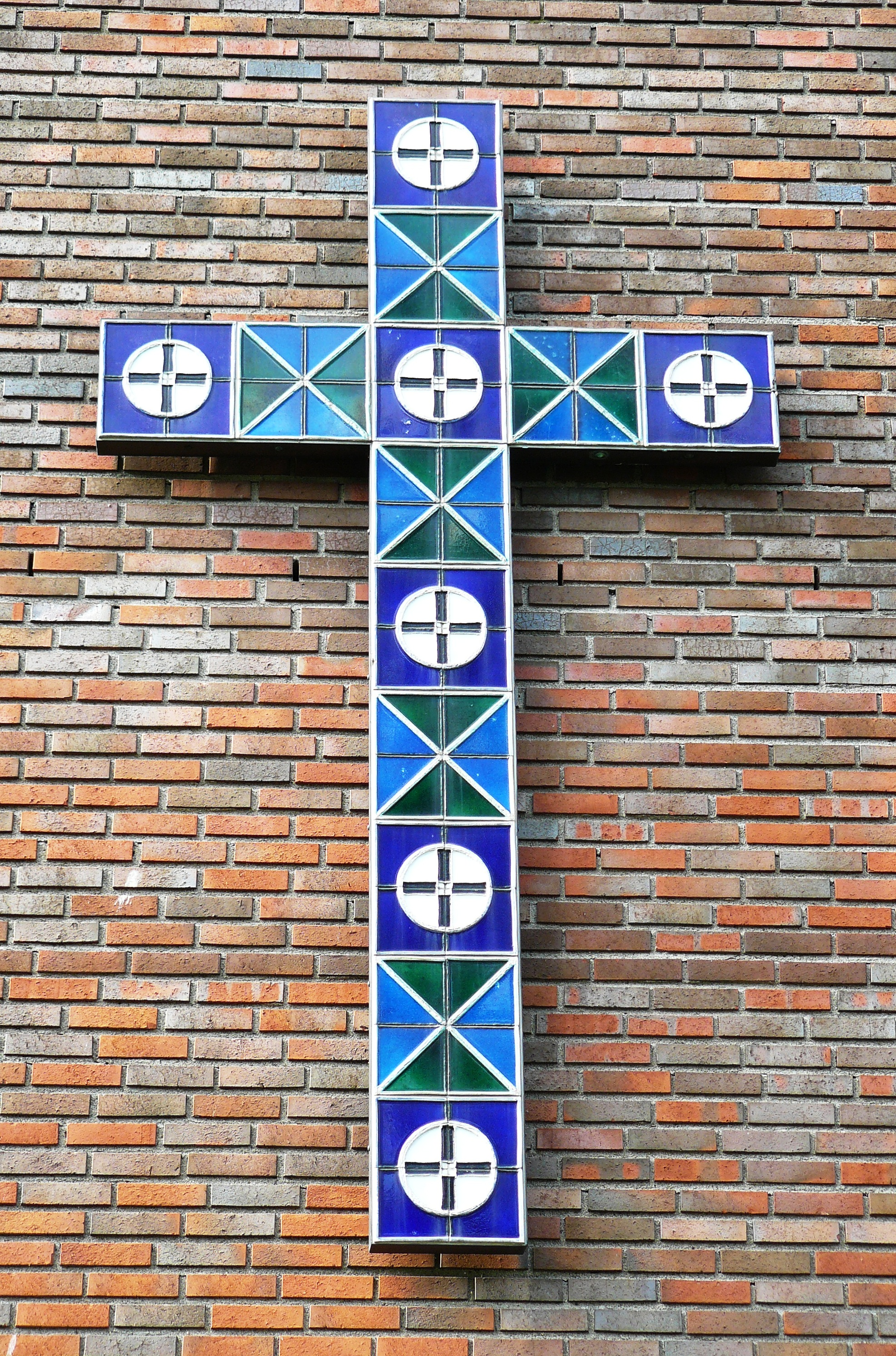
The exterior ceramic cross
