= Peder Wright Cappelen =

Norwegian writer and publisher (1931–1992)

- Born: 18 January 1931; Bærum, Norway
- Died: 4 January 1992 (aged 60); Bærum
- Occupations: Playwright; Non-fiction writer Publisher
- Spouse: Kari Simonsen
- Children: Herman Cappelen
- Relatives: Erling Wikborg (father-in-law); Sofie Cappelen (granddaughter)

Peder Wright Cappelen (18 January 1931 – 4 January 1992) was a Norwegian playwright, non-fiction writer and publisher.

== Personal life ==
Cappelen was born in Bærum to publisher Jørgen Wright Cappelen and Ragni Holm Johannessen. He was married first to art historian Tone Wikborg (daughter of Erling Wikborg), and from 1966 to actress Kari Simonsen.

== Career ==
From 1958, Cappelen headed the publishing house Helge Erichsens Forlag, which published Kjell Aukrust's and Marcel Proust's books.

Cappelen's books include Eventyret ute (1960), Alene med vidda (1964), and three books illustrated by Jens Johannessen, Høstblad (1976), Fugl i vår (1979) and Sommerfabel, fra Vidda til Skagen (1983). He has written plays inspired by fairytales, historical plays and plays for children.
