= Kari Simonsen =

Norwegian actress (born 1937)

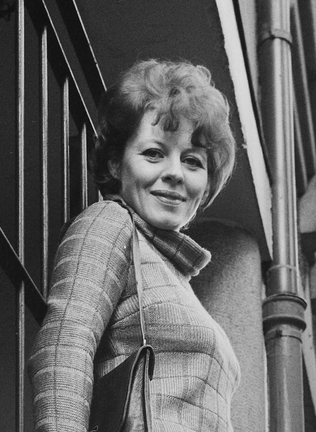
- Kari Simonsen, c. 1965
- Born: 5 June 1937 (age 87); Oslo, Norway
- Occupation: Actress
- Spouse: Peder Wright Cappelen
- Children: Herman Cappelen
- Awards: Amanda Honorary Award (2001)

Kari Simonsen (born 5 June 1937) is a Norwegian actress. She made her professional stage debut at Folketeatret in 1959. She was appointed at Oslo Nye Teater from 1960 to 1972, and at Nationaltheatret from 1974. She has also played for radio and television, and had guest appearances at the revue stages Chat Noir and Edderkoppen. Simonsen is the mother of philosopher Herman Cappelen.

She received the Amanda Honorary Award for 2001.
