= Ernest Lepore =

American philosopher (born 1950)

- Born: November 20, 1950 (age 75)

Education
- Education: University of Minnesota

Philosophical work
- Era: Contemporary philosophy
- Region: Western philosophy
- School: Analytic philosophy
- Main interests: Philosophy of mind, philosophy of language

Ernest or Ernie Lepore (born November 20, 1950) is an American philosopher and cognitive scientist and a professor of philosophy at Rutgers University.

== Education and career ==
Lepore earned his Ph.D. from the University of Minnesota in 1978, and began teaching at the University of Notre Dame before joining the philosophy department at Rutgers University in 1981, where he has taught ever since.

== Philosophical work ==
He is well known for his work on the philosophy of language and mind, sometimes in collaboration with Jerry Fodor, Herman Cappelen and Kirk Ludwig, as well as his work on philosophical logic and the philosophy of Donald Davidson.

== Selected publications ==
- Imagination and Convention: Distinguishing Grammar and Inference in Language, with Matthew Stone (Oxford University Press, 2015)
- Handbook in Philosophy of Language, ed. with B. C. Smith, (Oxford University Press, 2006)
- Insensitive Semantics, with Herman Cappelen (2004, Basil Blackwell)
- Donald Davidson: Truth, Meaning, Rationality in Mind, with Kirk Ludwig (Oxford University Press, 2005)
- Donald Davidson's truth-theoretic Semantics, with Kirk Ludwig (Oxford University Press, 2007),
- Meaning and Argument, with Sam Cumming (Blackwell, 2000)
- Holism: A Shopper's Guide, with Jerry Fodor (Blackwell, 1991)
- The Compositionality Papers, with Jerry Fodor (Oxford University Press, 2002)
- What Every Student Should Know with Sarah-Jane Leslie (Rutgers Press, 2002).
