= Raphael Demos =

Greek-American philosopher

- Demos in 1927
- Born: Raphael Demetracopoulos; January 23, 1892; Smyrna, Aidin Vilayet, Ottoman Empire
- Died: August 8, 1968 (aged 76) aboard ship, en route to the U.S.
- Other name: Raphael S. Demos
- Citizenship: American (from 1921)
- Children: John Demos

Education
- Education: Anatolia College (A.B., 1910); Harvard University (PhD, 1916); University of Cambridge
- Thesis: The Definition of Judgment (1916)
- Academic advisors: Bertrand Russell; Alfred North Whitehead

Philosophical work
- Era: Contemporary philosophy
- Region: Western philosophy
- School: Analytic
- Institutions: Harvard University
- Doctoral students: Donald Davidson
- Notable students: Martin Luther King Jr. Alvin Plantinga
- Main interests: Moral philosophy

Raphael S. Demos (/ˈdiːmoʊs/; Greek: Ραφαήλ Δήμου; (Note: Greek: [ˈðimu]) January 23, 1892 – August 8, 1968) was a Greek-American philosopher. He was Alford Professor of Natural Religion, Moral Philosophy and Civil Polity at Harvard University and an authority on the work of Plato. At Harvard, he taught Martin Luther King Jr.

== Early life ==
Raphael Demetracopoulos (Greek: Δημητρακόπουλος (Note: Greek: [ðimitraˈkopulos])) was born to Ottoman Greek parents at Smyrna (now Izmir), in the Ottoman Empire, on January 23, 1892. His father, Stratos Demetracopoulos, had been converted to evangelical Christianity by missionaries and had become an evangelical minister. Demos was brought up in Istanbul, and earned his A.B. degree in 1910 from Anatolia College in Marsovan.

According to the recollections of Bertrand Russell, Demos saved up and traveled steerage to the United States specifically to improve his education, having read all the books available to him at home. Arriving in Boston in 1913 without money, he first worked as a waiter in a restaurant and then as a janitor in the Harvard student halls of residence in order to fund his tuition at the university. He studied under Bertrand Russell, who was temporarily at Harvard, and Russell found Demos to be one of his best students and was impressed by his enthusiasm for philosophy which he found refreshing. Demos obtained his PhD from Harvard in 1916 for a dissertation titled The Definition of Judgment. He was naturalized as an American citizen in 1921.

== Family ==
Demos married Jean and they had a son, John Demos, who attended Harvard University and became a noted historian at Yale University, and a daughter, Penny, who attended Radcliffe College. Jean was on the staff of the New England Conservatory of Music from where she later received an honorary doctor of music degree. Demos's sister, Dorothy Demetracopoulou, graduated from Vassar College in 1927.

== Career ==
Demos began his academic career at Harvard as an assistant in philosophy in 1916–17, rising to assistant professor in 1926. He studied at the University of Cambridge in 1918–19. Demos was credited by Alfred North Whitehead in the preface of Science and the Modern World (1925) for reading proofs and "for the suggestion of many improvements in expression." He was a Guggenheim Fellow in 1927, awarded for "a study of the philosophy of evolution and social philosophy, principally in Paris, France", for which he studied at the University of Paris in 1928–29. In 1934, Demos lectured on Plato's social program, arguing that Fascism and Communism had their roots in his philosophy. He became Alford Professor of Natural Religion, Moral Philosophy and Civil Polity in 1945 in succession to William E. Hocking and he was a member of the Doty committee which produced the report, General Education in a Free Society, completed the same year. He was a fellow of Adams House. In 1956, he received an award from the Rockefeller Foundation, as well as from the American Philosophy Association in 1959 and the Littauer Foundation in 1960. He also taught at the Harvard Extension School.

Demos retired from Harvard in 1962, after which he taught at Vanderbilt University in 1962–63 and 1964–67. He taught at McGill University in Montreal in 1963–64.

In May 1963, Demos wrote to Martin Luther King Jr. asking whether King had ever been a student of his at Harvard. King replied to say that he had attended the university for two years as a special student and taken Demos's course on the philosophy of Plato in 1952–53 for which he had received a B from Demos. Coincidentally, King's wife, Coretta, had studied with Demos's wife Jean at the New England Conservatory of Music.

== Death and legacy ==
Demos died of a heart attack on 8 August 1968 while on board the S.S. Anna Maria returning to the United States. Since 1967, he had been living in Athens with his wife, teaching philosophy at College Year in Athens, where he also served as Academic Director. His papers relating to Aristotle are held in the archives of Harvard University. A volume of essays in Demos's honour was issued in 2016.

== Selected publications ==
- The Dialogues of Plato. Random House, New York, 1920. (Introduction) (Translated by Benjamin Jowett)
- Plato selections. C. Scribner's Sons, New York, 1927. (Editor) (The Modern Student's Library)
- Complete works of Plato. 1936. (Editor)
- The philosophy of Plato. Charles Scribner's Sons, New York, 1939.
- "Business and the good society", Harvard Business Review, July–August 1955.
- "The neo-Hellenic enlightenment (1750–1821): A general survey", Journal of the History of Ideas, Vol. XIX, No. 4 (October 1958), pp. 523–541.
