= John Putnam Demos =

American author and historian (born 1937)

- Born: 1937 (age 88–89); Cambridge, Massachusetts, U.S.
- Education: Harvard University
- Occupations: Author; historian
- Father: Raphael Demos
- Awards: Bancroft Prize; Francis Parkman Prize

John Putnam Demos (/ˈdiːmoʊs/; born 1937) is an American author and historian. He has written two books about witch hunts and has discovered that one of his ancestors was John Putnam Senior, a member of the Putnam family that was prominent in the Salem witch trials.

== Early life ==
John Putnam Demos was born in 1937 in Cambridge, Massachusetts to the Greek-American philosopher Raphael Demos.

He graduated from Harvard University.

== Career ==
Demos was awarded the prestigious Bancroft Prize for his book Entertaining Satan. He was awarded the 1995 Francis Parkman Prize for his book The Unredeemed Captive: A Family Story From Early America.

He retired in December 2008 as the Samuel Knight Professor of History at Yale University.

== Personal life ==
Demos lives in Tyringham, Massachusetts.

== Works ==
- Entertaining Satan - Witchcraft and the Culture of Early New England, Oxford University Press, London, 1982 ISBN 0-19-503378-7
- A Little Commonwealth: Family Life in Plymouth Colony
- The Unredeemed Captive: A Family Story from Early America (Winner of the Ray Allen Billington Award)
- The Enemy Within: 2,000 Years of Witch-Hunting in the Western World
- Editor, Remarkable Providences
- Past, Present, and Personal: The Family and the Life Course in American History
- The Heathen School: A Story of Hope and Betrayal in the Age of the Early Republic
