= Kirk Ludwig =

American philosopher (born 1959)

- Born: May 11, 1959 (age 66); Tulsa, Oklahoma

Philosophical work
- Era: Contemporary philosophy
- Region: Western philosophy
- School: Analytic Philosophy
- Main interests: Philosophy of Language, Philosophy of Mind, Epistemology, Metaphysics, Philosophy of action
- Notable ideas: Multiple Agents Account of Collective Action, Shared Plan Account of Collective Intention, Status Role Theory of Institutions
- Website: http://kirkludwig.net

Kirk Alan Ludwig (born May 11, 1959) is an American philosopher who is Professor of Philosophy and Cognitive Science at Indiana University.

== Education and career ==
Ludwig graduated summa cum laude with a B.S. in physics from the University of California, Santa Barbara in 1981 and earned his Ph.D. in philosophy at the University of California, Berkeley in 1990, where he worked with Donald Davidson. He joined the faculty at the University of Florida in 1990, where he taught until 2010 when he joined Indiana University Bloomington.

== Philosophical work ==
Ludwig works in Philosophy of Language, Philosophy of Mind, Epistemology, Metaphysics, and Philosophy of Action. He is best known for his work on natural language semantics in the tradition of Donald Davidson, his interpretation of the work of Donald Davidson with Ernest Lepore, his work on collective action, shared intention, and institutional agency, and his work on the epistemology of thought experiments and philosophical intuition. He has collaborated extensively with Marija Jankovic, Ernest Lepore, and Greg Ray, as well as with Emil Badici, John Biro, Daniel Boisvert, Wade Munroe, and Susan Schneider.

== Selected bibliography ==
- Ludwig, Kirk (2003). Donald Davidson. Cambridge University Press. ISBN 978-0521793827.
- Ludwig, Kirk; Lepore, Ernest (2005). Donald Davidson: Meaning, Truth, Language and Reality. Oxford University Press. ISBN 978-0199251346.
- Ludwig, Kirk; Lepore, Ernest (2007). Donald Davidson's Truth-theoretic Semantics. Oxford University Press. ISBN 978-0199251346.
- Ludwig, Kirk; Lepore, Ernest, eds. (2013). A Companion to Donald Davidson. Wiley-Blackwell. ISBN 978-0-470-67370-6.
- Ludwig, Kirk (2016). From Individual to Plural Agency: Collective Action I. Oxford University Press. ISBN 978-0198755623.
- Ludwig, Kirk (2017). From Plural to Institutional Agency: Collective Action II. Oxford University Press. ISBN 978-0198789994.
- Ludwig, Kirk; Jankovic, Marija, eds. (2018). The Routledge Handbook of Collective Intentionality. Routledge. ISBN 978-1138783638.

== See also ==
- Donald Davidson
- Radical interpretation
- Logical Form
- Ernest Lepore
