= Jens Johannessen =

Norwegian painter and graphical artist (born 1934)

- Born: 15 November 1934 (age 91); Orkdal Municipality, Norway
- Education: Norwegian National Academy of Fine Arts
- Occupation: Painter
- Awards: Prince Eugen Medal; Order of St. Olav

Jens Johannessen (born 15 November 1934) is a Norwegian painter and graphical artist.

He was born in Orkdal Municipality. He studied at the Norwegian National Academy of Fine Arts under Reidar Aulie from 1958 to 1961. He is represented in various galleries, including the National Gallery of Norway, Riksgalleriet, and the Taipei Fine Arts Museum. His book illustrations include Peder Wright Cappelen's Høstblad (1976) and Fugl i vår (1979). He was awarded the Prince Eugen Medal in 1993, and was decorated Commander of the Order of St. Olav in 1998.
