= Charles Chihara =

American philosopher (1932–2020)

- Born: Charles Seiyo Chihara; July 19, 1932; Seattle, Washington, U.S.
- Died: February 16, 2020 (aged 87)

Education
- Education: Seattle University (BS); Purdue University (MS); University of Washington (PhD)

Philosophical work
- Era: Contemporary philosophy
- Region: Western philosophy
- School: Analytic philosophy
- Main interests: Philosophy of mathematics

Charles Seiyo Chihara (July 19, 1932 – February 16, 2020) was an American philosopher specializing in the philosophy of mathematics and metaphysics.

== Early life and education ==
Born to Japanese-American parents in Seattle, Chihara spent part of his youth in an internment camp during World War II. After graduating from O'Dea High School, he earned a Bachelor of Science degree in mathematics from Seattle University, a Master of Science in mathematics from Purdue University, and a PhD in philosophy from the University of Washington.

== Career ==
For most of his career, Chihara served as a member of the faculty of the Department of Philosophy at University of California, Berkeley. In the philosophy of mathematics, Chihara is known for his work on nominalism, structuralism, and the liar paradox.
