= Robert S. Wyer =

American professor of psychology

Robert S. Wyer Jr.
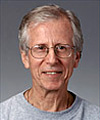
- Awards: Alexander von Humboldt Special Research Prize for Distinguished Scientists (1981), Thomas M. Ostrom Award for Distinguished Contributions to Person Memory and Social Cognition (1998), Distinguished Scientific Contribution Awards from the Society of Experimental Social Psychology (2008) and the Society for Consumer Psychology (2011).
- Scientific career
- Fields: Psychology, Marketing
- Workplaces: University of Illinois Urbana-Champaign; Chinese University of Hong Kong; University of Cincinnati

Robert S. Wyer Jr. is a visiting professor at the University of Cincinnati and professor (emeritus) at the University of Illinois Urbana-Champaign. He received his doctoral degree from the University of Colorado. Wyer Jr.'s research interests cover various aspects of social information processing, including:

- knowledge accessibility,
- comprehension,
- memory,
- social inference,
- the impact of affect on judgment and decisions,
- attitude formation and change,
- and consumer judgment and decision-making.

== Personal life ==
It was a somewhat circuitous path that led Bob Wyer to the field of social psychology. Raised in upstate New York, he received degrees in electrical engineering at Rensselaer Polytechnic Institute (1957) and New York University (1959). After working at Bell Telephone Laboratories, he enrolled in graduate school in social psychology at the University of Colorado in 1962.

Working with O. J. Harvey and William Scott, he began to investigate questions of cognitive organization and social information processing, establishing the themes that have guided his scholarship throughout his career. On completion of his doctoral studies, Wyer held academic appointments at the University of Iowa and the University of Illinois at Chicago Circle.

He developed a comprehensive view of the cognitive bases of judgment and inference in his first major book, Cognitive Organization and Change: An Information Processing Approach (1974). In 1973, he moved to the University of Illinois Urbana-Champaign, where he spent the next several decades of his research career. During that time, he began to develop a full-fledged social-cognitive perspective on topics such as attitudes, attribution, and impression formation and became recognized as one of the most prolific scholars in the history of social psychology.

Upon retiring from Illinois in 1995, he embarked on a research career in consumer information processing, holding visiting positions at the Hong Kong University of Science and Technology (1998-2009), the Chinese University of Hong Kong (2011-2017), and the University of Cincinnati (2017-2019) with an interim appointment in marketing at the University of Illinois (2009-2011)

== Research ==
Dr. Wyer is the author or coauthor of four books, the most recent being Social Comprehension and Judgment (2004). He is the editor of several others including the Handbook of social cognition, the Advances in Social Cognition series, and Understanding Culture: Theory, Research, and Application (with Chi-yue Chiu and Ying-yi Hong). He has published numerous journal articles and book chapters and was cited as having published the greatest number of articles in the Journal of Personality and Social Psychology in the first 30 years of its inception. He has published at least one article or book chapter in each of the 55 years since receiving his Ph.D. and has been the director of 46 doctoral dissertations at UI, HKUST, and CUHK.

== Services and honors ==
Dr. Wyer is a former editor of the Journal of Experimental Social Psychology and Journal of Consumer Psychology. He is a recipient of the Alexander von Humboldt Special Research Prize for Distinguished Scientists in 1981, the Thomas M. Ostrom Award for Distinguished Contributions to Person Memory and Social Cognition in 1998, and Distinguished Scientific Contribution Awards from the Society of Experimental Social Psychology in 2008 and the Society for Consumer Psychology in 2011 and was elected as a Fellow of the latter society in 2016. A tribute to his contribution to the field of social cognition was made by the book, "Foundations of Social Cognition: A Festschrift in Honor of Robert S. Wyer, Jr.".
