= Doxastic attitudes =

Epistemic attitudes a person can hold towards a proposition

Doxastic attitudes are epistemic attitudes which a person can hold towards a proposition. The most commonly discussed doxastic attitude is belief (holding something to be true). Other doxastic attitudes include disbelief (holding something to be false) and suspension of judgment (withholding assent to a proposition without judging it to be true nor false).

The term doxastic is derived from the ancient Greek word δόξα (or doxa), which means "belief". Thus, doxastic attitudes include beliefs and other psychological attitudes which resemble beliefs. Doxastic attitudes in many ways resemble propositional attitudes, although the two concepts are distinct from one another.

Other terms which are commonly used to refers to beliefs, such as "judgment" and "opinion", can also be classified as doxastic attitudes. More broadly, the term "doxastic attitude" can also refer to states sufficiently similar to beliefs, such as psychological certainty and credence.

== See also ==
- Doxastic logic
