= Donald Davidson (philosopher) =

American philosopher (1917–2003)

- Born: Donald Herbert Davidson; 6 March 1917; Springfield, Massachusetts, U.S.
- Died: 30 August 2003 (aged 86); Oakland, California, U.S.

Education
- Education: Harvard University (BA, MA, PhD)
- Thesis: Plato's 'Philebus' (1949)
- Doctoral advisor: Raphael Demos; Donald Cary Williams
- Other advisors: W. V. O. Quine; Alfred North Whitehead

Philosophical work
- Era: 20th-century philosophy
- Region: Western philosophy
- School: Analytic philosophy Neopragmatism
- Institutions: University of California, Berkeley
- Doctoral students: Akeel Bilgrami; Michael Bratman; Kirk Ludwig; Stephen Yablo
- Notable students: Tyler Burge
- Main interests: Philosophy of language, philosophy of action, philosophy of mind, epistemology, ontology
- Notable ideas: See list: Anomalous monism (identity of mental and physical events without strict psychophysical laws); Causal theory of action; Criticism of alternative conceptual schemes (the third dogma of empiricism) (Note: W. V. O. Quine elaborated the first two dogmas in his paper "Two Dogmas of Empiricism".); Principle of charity; Reasons as causes; Slingshot argument; Swampman; Triangulation argument; Truth-conditional semantics; Understanding as radical interpretation

Donald Herbert Davidson (March 6, 1917 – August 30, 2003) was an American philosopher and the Slusser Professor of Philosophy at the University of California, Berkeley. He previously held teaching appointments at Stanford University, Rockefeller University, Princeton University, and the University of Chicago. Davidson was known for his charismatic personality and difficult writing style, as well as the systematic nature of his philosophy. His work exerted considerable influence in many areas of philosophy from the 1960s onward, particularly in philosophy of mind, philosophy of language, and action theory. Most of Davidson's influence was on analytic philosophy, but his work has attracted attention in continental philosophy, literary theory, and related areas.

== Early life and education ==
Donald Herbert Davidson was born on March 6, 1917, in Springfield, Massachusetts, to Grace Cordelia (née Anthony) and Clarence "Davie" Herbert Davidson. His family moved around frequently during his childhood; they lived in the Philippines until he was four, and then in various cities in the Northeastern United States before finally settling in Staten Island when he was nine. He briefly attended a public school in Staten Island before receiving a scholarship to study at Staten Island Academy. He first became interested in philosophy while in high school, where he read works by Nietzsche, Plato's Parmenides, and Kant's Critique of Pure Reason.

After graduating from high school in 1935, he enrolled at Harvard as an English major before switching to classics and earning his BA in 1939. At Harvard, he came to know many important philosophers of the time, including C. I. Lewis, Alfred North Whitehead, Raphael Demos, and especially W. V. O. Quine, who became a lifelong friend and major philosophical influence. He also befriended the future conductor Leonard Bernstein at Harvard.

Soon after earning his BA, he was awarded a Teschemacher Scholarship to pursue graduate studies in classical philosophy at Harvard. As a graduate student, he took courses on logic taught by Quine and was classmates with Roderick Chisholm and Roderick Firth. Quine's seminars on logical positivism greatly influenced his view of philosophy, as they made him realize that "it was possible to be serious about getting things right in philosophy, or at least not getting things wrong." He graduated with an MA in classical philosophy in 1941.

While pursuing a PhD at Harvard, he concurrently enrolled at Harvard Business School, but he left a few weeks before graduating in 1942 so that he could volunteer for the U.S. Navy. During World War II, he taught spotters to distinguish enemy planes from Allied planes and participated in the ground invasions of Sicily, Salerno, and Anzio. After returning from the war in 1945, he completed his PhD dissertation on Plato's Philebus under the supervision of Raphael Demos and D. C. Williams. It was accepted in 1949, earning him his PhD in philosophy.

== Philosophical work ==
=== Anomalous monism ===
Anomalous monism is a philosophical thesis about the mind–body relationship first proposed by Davidson in his 1970 paper "Mental Events". The theory is twofold and states that mental events are identical with physical events, and that the mental is anomalous, i.e., under their mental descriptions, causal relations between these mental events are not describable by strict physical laws. Hence, Davidson proposes an identity theory of mind without the reductive bridge laws associated with the type-identity theory.

Since in this theory every mental event is some physical event or other, the idea is that someone's thinking at a certain time, for example, that snow is white, is a certain pattern of neural firing in their brain at that time, an event that can be characterized as both a thinking that snow is white (a type of mental event) and a pattern of neural firing (a type of physical event). There is just one event that can be characterized both in mental terms and in physical terms. If mental events are physical events, they can at least in principle be explained and predicted, like all physical events, on the basis of laws of physical science. But according to anomalous monism, events cannot be so explained or predicted as described in mental terms (such as "thinking", "desiring", etc.), but only as described in physical terms: this is the distinctive feature of the thesis as a brand of physicalism.

Davidson's argument for anomalous monism relies on the following three principles:

1. The principle of causal interaction: there exist both mental-to-physical as well as physical-to-mental causal interactions.
2. The principle of the nomological character of causality: all events are causally related through strict laws.
3. The principle of the anomalism of the mental: there are no strict psychophysical or psychological laws that can causally relate mental events with physical events or mental events with other mental events.

See the main article for an explanation of his argument as well as objections.

=== Third dogma of empiricism ===
In his 1974 essay "On the Very Idea of a Conceptual Scheme", Davidson critiques what he calls the "third dogma of empiricism". The term is a reference to the famous 1951 essay "Two Dogmas of Empiricism" by his graduate teacher, W. V. O. Quine, in which he critiques two central tenets, or "dogmas", of logical positivism: the analytic–synthetic distinction and reductionism. Davidson identifies an additional third dogma present in logical positivism and even in Quine's own work, as well as the work of Thomas Kuhn, Benjamin Lee Whorf, and others, and he argues that it is as untenable as the first two dogmas.

Davidson's third dogma refers to scheme–content dualism, the idea that all knowledge is the result of one's conceptual scheme being put to work on raw data from the world. The content is objective because it is what is given by the world, whereas the scheme is subjective because it is the contribution of one's mind or language to knowledge. One consequence of scheme–content dualism is conceptual relativism, the idea that two different people or communities could have radically different, incommensurable (Kuhn's term for untranslatable) ways of making sense of the world. On this view, truth is relative to a conceptual scheme rather than objective.

In the essay, Davidson argues that scheme–content dualism is incoherent because it implies that the conceptual and empirical components of knowledge are separable, and thus that one could meaningfully talk about a schemeless content (raw data) and a contentless scheme (an alternative conceptual scheme). This dualistic picture suggests that an alternative conceptual scheme is one that is incommensurable with one's own but shares a common relation with the empirical content. Davidson fundamentally disagrees with this picture, writing, "a form of activity that cannot be interpreted as language in our language is not speech behavior." He presents several arguments for this thesis, all of which essentially show that it is impossible to separate the notions of truth and meaning in such a way as to allow for incommensurable conceptual schemes. This means that using language, having beliefs, and being generally rational are all a matter of being in contact with a mind-independent, objective world.

The upshot of Davidson's argument is that there is no strict boundary between the subjective and objective, as rational behavior is necessarily tied to the world that causes such behavior. This also undermines conceptual relativism, as there is no such thing as a conceptual scheme that stands between one's beliefs about the world and the world itself: truth is not relative to a scheme, but objective.

Unlike the first two dogmas, which can be rejected by empiricists, Davidson claims that the third dogma of empiricism is "perhaps the last, for if we give it up it is not clear that there is anything distinctive left to call empiricism." Richard Rorty and Michael Williams have even said that the third dogma is necessary for any study of epistemology. Rorty in particular uses Davidson's work to lend support to his neopragmatism.

=== Swampman ===
Swampman is the subject of a thought experiment introduced by Davidson in his 1987 paper "Knowing One's Own Mind". In the experiment, Davidson is struck by lightning in a swamp and disintegrated, but at the same exact moment, an identical copy of Davidson, the Swampman, is made from a nearby tree and proceeds through life exactly as Davidson would have, indistinguishable from him. The experiment is used by Davidson to claim that thought and meaning cannot exist in a vacuum but are dependent on their interconnections to the world. Therefore, despite being physically identical to himself, the Swampman does not have thoughts nor meaningful language, as it has no causal history to base them on.

The experiment runs as follows:

Suppose lightning strikes a dead tree in a swamp; I am standing nearby. My body is reduced to its elements, while entirely by coincidence (and out of different molecules) the tree is turned into my physical replica. My replica, The Swampman, moves exactly as I did; according to its nature it departs the swamp, encounters and seems to recognize my friends, and appears to return their greetings in English. It moves into my house and seems to write articles on radical interpretation. No one can tell the difference. But there is a difference. My replica can't recognize my friends; it can't recognize anything, since it never cognized anything in the first place. It can't know my friends' names (though of course it seems to), it can't remember my house. It can't mean what I do by the word 'house', for example, since the sound 'house' it makes was not learned in a context that would give it the right meaning—or any meaning at all. Indeed, I don't see how my replica can be said to mean anything by the sounds it makes, nor to have any thoughts.

— Donald Davidson, "Knowing One's Own Mind"

This experiment is nearly identical to the central plot of Alan Moore's earlier 1980s comic series Swamp Thing.

== Personal life and death ==
Davidson was married three times. He married his first wife, artist Virginia Bolton, in 1941 and had his only child with her, Elizabeth Boyer (née Davidson). Following his divorce from Bolton, he married Nancy Hirschberg, Professor of Psychology at the University of Illinois at Urbana-Champaign and later at Chicago Circle. She died in 1979. In 1984, Davidson married philosopher and psychoanalyst Marcia Cavell. He corresponded with Catholic nun, literary critic, and poet M. Bernetta Quinn.

Davidson was a lifelong atheist who believed that many of the claims made by religions are not even truth-apt.

On August 27, 2003, Davidson underwent knee replacement surgery at Alta Bates Summit Medical Center in Oakland, California, but went into cardiac arrest shortly after the operation. He died on August 30, at the age of 86.

== Awards ==
- Hegel Prize (1991)
- Jean Nicod Prize (1995)

== Bibliography ==
- Decision-Making: An Experimental Approach, co-authored with Patrick Suppes and Sidney Siegel. Stanford: Stanford University Press. 1957.
- Semantics of Natural Language, co-edited with Gilbert Harman, 2nd ed. New York: Springer Nature. 1973.
- Plato's ‘Philebus’. New York: Garland Publishing. 1990.
- Essays on Actions and Events, 2nd ed. Oxford: Oxford University Press. 2001a.
- Inquiries into Truth and Interpretation, 2nd ed. Oxford: Oxford University Press. 2001b.
- Subjective, Intersubjective, Objective. Oxford: Oxford University Press. 2001c.
- Problems of Rationality. Oxford: Oxford University Press. 2004.
- Truth, Language, and History: Philosophical Essays. Oxford: Oxford University Press. 2005.
- Truth and Predication. Cambridge, Mass.: Harvard University Press. 2005.
- The Essential Davidson. Oxford: Oxford University Press. 2006.
- The Structure of Truth: The 1970 John Locke Lectures. Oxford: Oxford University Press. 2020.

== Filmography ==
- Rudolf Fara (host), In Conversation: Donald Davidson (19 video cassettes), Philosophy International, Centre for Philosophy of the Natural and Social Sciences, London School of Economics, 1997.

== See also ==
- American philosophy
- Swamp Thing
