= Radical interpretation =

Philosophical thought experiment

Radical interpretation is interpretation of a speaker, including attributing beliefs and desires to them and meanings to their words, from scratch—that is, without relying on translators, dictionaries, or specific prior knowledge of their mental states. The term was introduced by American philosopher Donald Davidson (1973) and is meant to suggest important similarity to W. V. O. Quine's term radical translation, which occurs in his work on the indeterminacy of translation. Radical translation is translation of a speaker's language, without prior knowledge, by observing the speaker's use of the language in context.

Even more so than radical translation did for Quine, radical interpretation plays an important role in Davidson's work, but the exact nature of this role is up for debate. Some see Davidson as using radical interpretation directly in his arguments against conceptual relativism and the possibility of massive error—of most of our beliefs being false. But Davidson seems to explicitly reject this reading in "Radical Interpretation Interpreted".

There is also a more narrow and technical version of radical interpretation used by Davidson: given the speaker's attitudes of holding particular sentences true in particular circumstances, the speaker's hold-true attitudes, the radical interpreter is to infer a theory of meaning, a truth theory meeting a modified version of Alfred Tarski's Convention T, for the speaker's idiolect. Ernest Lepore and Kirk Ludwig characterize this as inference from sentences of the form:

Ceteris paribus, S holds true s at t if and only if p.

to corresponding T-sentences of the form

s is true (S, t) if and only if q

where s is a sentence in the idiolect of the speaker S, t is a time, and p and q are filled in with sentences in the metalanguage.

== See also ==
- Indeterminacy of translation
- Meaning (linguistics)
- Philosophy of language
- Radical translation
