= Leslie Houlden =

British Anglican priest and academic (1929–2022)

- Born: 1 March 1929; Cheshire, England
- Died: 3 December 2022 (aged 93)

Academic background
- Education: Altrincham Grammar School for Boys
- Alma mater: The Queen's College, Oxford

Academic work
- Discipline: Theology
- Sub-discipline: Early Christianity; Pauline epistles; history of Jesus
- Institutions: Chichester Theological College; Trinity College, Oxford; Cuddesdon Theological College; Ripon College Cuddesdon; King's College London

Ecclesiastical career
- Religion: Christianity (Anglicanism)
- Church: Church of England
- Ordained: 1955 (deacon); 1956 (priest)

James Leslie Houlden (1 March 1929 – 3 December 2022) was a British Anglican priest and academic. He served as Principal of Cuddesdon Theological College from 1970 to 1975, and then, after its amalgamation with Ripon Hall, Principal of Ripon College Cuddesdon from 1975 to 1977. He then joined the staff of King's College, London, rising to become Professor of Theology between 1987 and 1994.

== Early life and education ==
Houlden was educated at Altrincham Grammar School, an all-boys grammar school in Altrincham, Greater Manchester, and Queen's College, Oxford. He studied modern history and then theology; one of his theology tutors was Dennis Nineham. He then trained for ordination at Cuddesdon Theological College.

== Career ==
Houlden was ordained in the Church of England as a deacon in 1955 and as a priest in 1956. From 1955 to 1958, he served his curacy at the Church of St Mary the Virgin, Hunslet, an Anglo-Catholic church in the Diocese of Ripon. He was then chaplain of Chichester Theological College from 1958 to 1960. In October 1960, he became chaplain and fellow of Trinity College, Oxford, in succession to Austin Farrer who had encouraged him to apply.

Houlden served as Principal of Cuddesdon Theological College, an Anglo-Catholic theological college of the Church of England, from 1970 to 1975. Some perceived him as "too tolerant of homosexuality among the students". Cuddesdon amalgamated with Ripon Hall, a liberal theological college, in 1975, and he served as Principal of the newly created Ripon College Cuddesdon from 1975 to 1977. He was made an honorary canon of Christ Church, Oxford in 1976. He couldn't resolve the tensions of the new, combined college, including its "camp" atmosphere, and this led to conflict with its governing body and his eventual resignation.

In 1977, Houlden left the confines of theological college and was appointed lecturer in New Testament studies at King's College London. He was promoted to senior lecturer in 1985, and made Professor of Theology in 1987. He was editor of the academic journal Theology from 1983 to 1991. He was also involved in academic administration, serving as dean of the Faculty of Theology and Religious Studies from 1986 to 1988, and head of the Department of Biblical Studies from 1988 to 1989. He was acting Dean of King's College London for the 1993/94 academic year. He retired in 1994 and was appointed professor emeritus.

Houlden was active behind the scenes of the Church of England. From 1969 to 1976, he was a member of its Liturgical Commission and its Doctrine Commission. He was a member of the General Synod of the Church of England from 1980 to 1990.

=== Views ===
Houlden was a liberal Christian.

Houlden was himself an unashamed liberal and many of his conclusions about the Bible were alarming to traditionalists. He said that the New Testament evidence about the resurrection of Jesus was so varied that differences of belief about its character were inevitable. St Paul's ethical judgments were, he asserted, addressed to particular first-century situations and were not therefore to be universalised.

— Obituary in The Telegraph

== Personal life ==
Houlden never married.

Houlden died on 3 December 2022, at the age of 93. His funeral was held at St Mary's Church, Temple Balsall, on 21 December 2022.

== Honours ==
In 1994, a Festschrift was published for him, titled "Resurrection: Essays in Honour of Leslie Houlden".

== Selected works ==
- Houlden, J. L. (1977). Paul's Letters from Prison: Philippians, Colossians, Philemon, and Ephesians. Philadelphia: Westminster John Knox Press. ISBN 978-0664213473.
- Houlden, Leslie (1977). "The Creed of Experience". In Hick, John (ed.). The Myth of God Incarnate. London: SCM Press.
- Houlden, Leslie (1982). What Did the First Christians Believe?. Guildford: Lutterworth. ISBN 978-0718825157.
- Coggins, R. J.; Houlden, J. L., eds. (1990). A Dictionary of Biblical interpretation. London: SCM Press. ISBN 978-0334002949.
- Houlden, Leslie, ed. (1991). Austin Farrer: The Essential Sermons. London: SPCK. ISBN 978-0281044641.
- Byrne, Peter; Houlden, Leslie, eds. (1995). Companion Encyclopedia of Theology. London: Routledge. ISBN 978-0415064477.
- Houlden, Leslie, ed. (2003). Jesus in History, Thought, and Culture: An Encyclopedia. Santa Barbara: ABC-Clio. ISBN 978-1576078563.
- Houlden, Leslie, ed. (2005). Jesus: The Complete Guide. London: Continuum. ISBN 978-0826480118.
- Houlden, Leslie (2007). Decoding Early Christianity: Truth and Legend in the Early Church. Westport: Greenwood World Publishing. ISBN 978-1846450181.
