= Problem of religious language =

Philosophical problem of how to talk about God

The problem of religious language considers whether it is possible to talk about God meaningfully if the traditional conceptions of God as being incorporeal, infinite, and timeless, are accepted. Because these traditional conceptions of God make it difficult to describe God, religious language has the potential to be meaningless. Theories of religious language either attempt to demonstrate that such language is meaningless, or attempt to show how religious language can still be meaningful.

Often, religious language has been explained as via negativa, analogy, symbolism, or myth, each of which describes a way of talking about God in human terms. The via negativa is a way of referring to God according to what God is not; analogy uses human qualities as standards against which to compare divine qualities; symbolism is used non-literally to describe otherwise ineffable experiences; and a mythological interpretation of religion attempts to reveal fundamental truths behind religious stories. Alternative explanations of religious language cast it as having political, performative, or imperative functions.

Empiricist David Hume's requirement that claims about reality must be verified by evidence influenced the logical positivist movement, particularly the philosopher A. J. Ayer. The movement proposed that, for a statement to hold meaning, it must be possible to verify its truthfulness empirically – with evidence from the senses. Consequently, the logical positivists argued that religious language must be meaningless because the propositions it makes are impossible to verify. Austrian philosopher Ludwig Wittgenstein has been regarded as a logical positivist by some academics because he distinguished between things that can and cannot be spoken about; others have argued that he could not have been a logical positivist because he emphasised the importance of mysticism. British philosopher Antony Flew proposed a similar challenge based on the principle that, in so far as assertions of religious belief cannot be empirically falsified, religious statements are rendered meaningless.

The analogy of language-games – most commonly associated with Ludwig Wittgenstein – has been proposed as a way of establishing meaning in religious language. The theory asserts that language must be understood in terms of a game: just as each game has its own rules determining what can and cannot be done, so each context of language has its own rules determining what is and is not meaningful. Religion is classified as a possible and legitimate language game which is meaningful within its own context. Various parables have also been proposed to solve the problem of meaning in religious language. R. M. Hare used his parable of a lunatic to introduce the concept of "bliks" – unfalsifiable beliefs according to which a worldview is established – which are not necessarily meaningless. Basil Mitchell used a parable to show that faith can be logical, even if it seems unverifiable. John Hick used his parable of the Celestial City to propose his theory of eschatological verification, the view that if there is an afterlife, then religious statements will be verifiable after death.

== Classical understanding of religious language ==
Religious language is a philosophical problem arising from the difficulties in accurately describing God. Because God is generally conceived as incorporeal, infinite, and timeless, ordinary language cannot always apply to that entity. This makes speaking about or attributing properties to God difficult: a religious believer might simultaneously wish to describe God as good, yet also hold that God's goodness is unique and cannot be articulated by human language of goodness. This raises the problem of how (and whether) God can be meaningfully spoken about at all, which causes problems for religious belief since the ability to describe and talk about God is important in religious life. The French philosopher Simone Weil expressed this problem in her work Waiting for God, in which she outlined her dilemma: she was simultaneously certain of God's love and conscious that she could not adequately describe him.

The medieval doctrine of divine simplicity also poses problems for religious language. This suggests that God has no accidental properties – these are properties that a being can have which do not contribute to its essence. If God has no accidental properties, he cannot be as he is traditionally conceived, because properties such as goodness are accidental. If divine simplicity is accepted, then to describe God as good would entail that goodness and God have the same definition. Such limits can also be problematic to religious believers; for example, the Bible regularly ascribes different emotions to God, ascriptions which would be implausible according to the doctrine of divine simplicity.

=== Via negativa ===
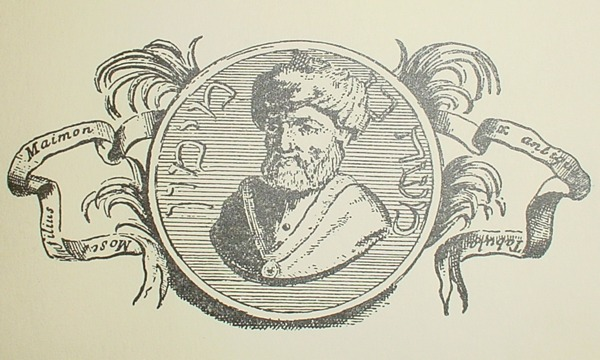
18th-century depiction of Maimonides, who developed the via negativa

The via negativa, or apophatic theology, is an approach to religious language based on refraining from describing God, or describing God in terms of what he is not. For example, the Jewish philosopher Maimonides believed that God can only be ascribed negative attributes, a view based on two fundamental Jewish beliefs: that the existence of God must be accepted, and that it is forbidden to describe God. Maimonides believed that God is simple and so cannot be ascribed any essential attributes. He therefore argued that statements about God must be taken negatively, for example, "God lives" should be taken as "God does not lack vitality". Maimonides did not believe that God holds all of his attributes perfectly and without impairment; rather, he proposed that God lies outside of any human measures. To say that God is powerful, for example, would mean that God's power is beyond worldly power, and incomparable to any other power. In doing so, Maimonides attempted to illustrate God's indescribable nature and draw attention to the linguistic limits of describing God.

Critics maintain that such kind of solution severely limits the degree to which what can be spoken about God.

=== Analogy and metaphor ===
Thomas Aquinas argued that statements about God are analogous to human experience because of the causal relationship between God and creatures. An analogous term is partly univocal (has only one meaning) and partly equivocal (has more than one potential meaning) because an analogy is in some ways the same and in some ways different from the subject. He proposed that those godly qualities which resemble human qualities are described analogously, with reference to human terms; for example, when God is described as good, it does not mean that God is good in human terms, but that human goodness is used as a reference to describe God's goodness.

Philosopher Taede Smedes argued that religious language is symbolic. Denying any conflict between science and religion, he proposes that 'to believe' means to accept a conviction (that God exists, in the context of Christianity), which is different from 'knowing', which only occurs once something is proven. Thus, according to Smedes, we believe things that we do not know for sure. Smedes argues that, rather than being part of the world, God is so far beyond the world that there can be no common standard to which both God and the world can be compared. He argues that people can still believe in God, even though he cannot be compared to anything in the world, because belief in God is just an alternative way of viewing that world (he likens this to two people viewing a painting differently). Smedes claims that there should be no reason to look for a meaning behind our metaphors and symbols of God because the metaphors are all we have of God. He suggests that we can only talk of God pro nobis (for us) and not in se (as such) or sine nobis (without us). The point, he argues, is not that our concept of God should correspond with reality, but that we can only conceive of God through metaphors.

In the twentieth century, Ian Ramsey developed the theory of analogy, a development later cited in numerous works by Alister McGrath. He argued that various models of God are provided in religious writings that interact with each other: a range of analogies for salvation and the nature of God. Ramsey proposed that the models used modify and qualify each other, defining the limits of other analogies. As a result, no one analogy on its own is sufficient, but the combination of every analogy presented in Scripture gives a full and consistent depiction of God. The use of other analogies may then be used to determine if any one model of God is abused or improperly applied.

It is proposed that analogy is also present in everyday discourses. For example, when a speaker uses the word square, the speakers may well use it to refer to an object that is approximately square rather than a genuine square.

Critics contend that metaphor theories are unsatisfactory because "metaphors are always in principle susceptible to literal paraphrase."

=== Symbolism ===
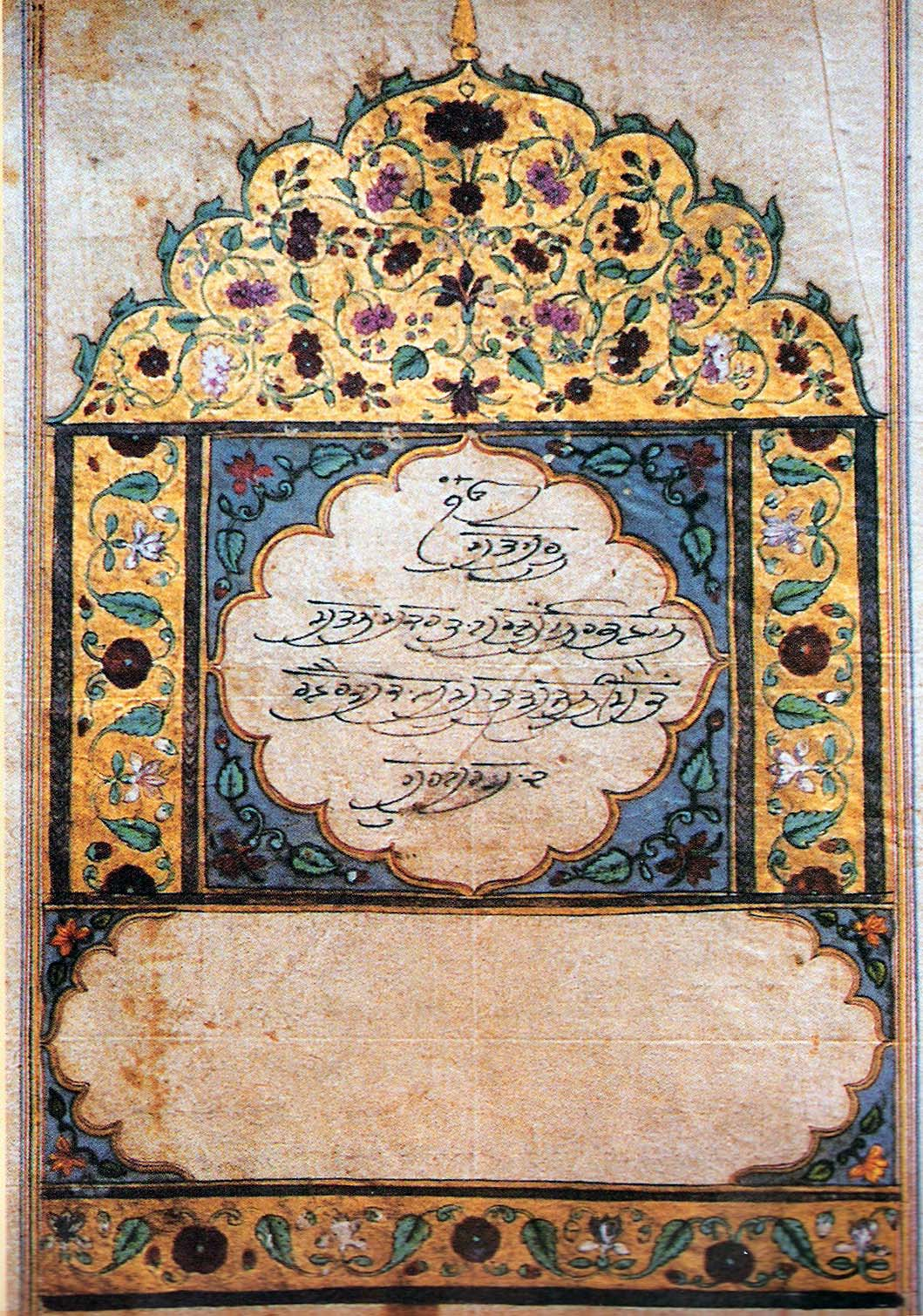
Sikh religious text, the Sri Guru Granth Sahib Nishan, in which religious language is used symbolically

Philosopher Paul Tillich argued that religious faith is best expressed through symbolism because a symbol points to a meaning beyond itself and best expresses transcendent religious beliefs. He believed that any statement about God is symbolic and participates in the meaning of a concept. Tillich used the example of a national flag to illustrate his point: a flag points to something beyond itself, the country it represents, but also participates in the meaning of the country. He believed that symbols could unite a religious believer with a deeper dimension of himself as well as with a greater reality. Tillich believed that symbols must emerge from an individual collective unconsciousness, and can only function when they are accepted by the unconscious. He believed that symbols cannot be invented, but live and die at the appropriate times.

Louis Dupré differentiates between signs and symbols, proposing that a sign points to something while a symbol represents it. A symbol holds its own meaning: rather than merely pointing someone towards another object, it takes the place of and represents that object. He believes that a symbol has some ambiguity which does not exist with a sign. Dupré believes that a symbol may deserve respect because it contains what is signified within itself. A symbol reveals a reality beyond what is already perceived and transforms the ways the current reality is perceived. Dupré differentiates between religious and aesthetic symbols, suggesting that a religious symbol points towards something which "remains forever beyond our reach". He proposed that a religious symbol does not reveal the nature of what it signifies, but conceals it.

Langdon Brown Gilkey explained religious language and experience in terms of symbolism, identifying three characteristic features of religious symbolism which distinguish it from other language use. Firstly, religious symbolism has a double focus, referring both to something empirical and to something transcendent; Gilkey argued that the empirical manifestation points towards the transcendent being. Secondly, he believed that religious symbolism concerns fundamental questions of life, involving issues important to an individual or community. Finally, he argued that religious symbols provide standards by which life should be lived.

In the Sikh religious text the Guru Granth Sahib, religious language is used symbolically and metaphorically. In the text, Sikh Gurus repeat that the experiences they have while meditating are ineffable, incognizable, incomprehensible, and transensuous – this means that there is no object of their experience that can be conceptualised. To overcome this, the Sikh Gurus used symbolic and metaphorical language, assuming that there is a resemblance between the mystical experience of the divine (the sabad) and those experiencing it. For example, light is used to refer to the spiritual reality.

=== Myth ===
William Paden argued that religious language uses myth to present truths through stories. He argued that to those who practice a religion, myths are not mere fiction, but provide religious truths. Paden believed that a myth must explain something in the world with reference to a sacred being or force, and dismissed any myths which did not as "folktales". Using the example of creation myths, he differentiated myths from scientific hypotheses, the latter of which can be scientifically verified and do not reveal a greater truth; a myth cannot be analysed in the same way as a scientific theory.

Lutheran theologian Rudolf Bultmann proposed that the Bible contains existential content which is expressed through mythology; Bultmann sought to find the existential truths behind the veil of mythology, a task known as 'demythologising'. Bultmann distinguished between informative language and language with personal import, the latter of which commands obedience. He believed that God interacts with humans as the divine Word, perceiving a linguistic character inherent in God, which seeks to provide humans with self-understanding. Bultmann believed that the cultural embeddedness of the Bible could be overcome by demythologising the Bible, a process which he believed would allow readers to better encounter the word of God.

Christian philosopher John Hick believed that the language of the Bible should be demythologised to be compatible with naturalism. He offered a demythologised Christology, arguing that Jesus was not God incarnate, but a man with incredible experience of divine reality. To Hick, calling Jesus the Son of God was a metaphor used by Jesus' followers to describe their commitment to what Jesus represented. Hick believed that demythologising the incarnation would make sense of the variety of world religions and give them equal validity as ways to encounter God.

== Logical positivism ==
In the conclusion of his Enquiry Concerning Human Understanding, Scottish philosopher David Hume argued that statements that make claims about reality must be verified by experience, and dismissed those that cannot be verified as meaningless. Hume regarded most religious language as unverifiable by experiment and so dismissed it. Hume criticised the view that we cannot speak about God, and proposed that this view is no different from the skeptical view that nothing meaningful can be said about God. He was unconvinced by Aquinas' theory of analogy and argued that God's attributes must be completely different from human attributes, making comparisons between the two impossible. Hume's scepticism influenced the logical positivist movement of the twentieth century.

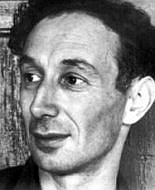
A. J. Ayer argued that religious language is meaningless because it is unverifiable.

The logical positivism movement originated in the Vienna Circle and was continued by British philosopher A. J. Ayer. The Vienna Circle adopted the distinction between analytic and synthetic statements: analytic statements are those whose meaning is contained within the words themselves, such as definitions, tautologies or mathematical statements, while synthetic statements make claims about reality. To determine whether a synthetic statement is meaningful, the Vienna Circle developed a verifiability theory of meaning, which proposed that for a synthetic statement to have cognitive meaning, its truthfulness must be empirically verifiable. Because claims about God cannot be empirically verified, the logical positivists argued that religious propositions are meaningless.

In 1936, Ayer wrote Language, Truth and Logic, in which he claimed that religious language is meaningless. He put forward a strong empirical position, arguing that all knowledge must either come from observations of the world or be necessarily true, like mathematical statements. In doing so, he rejected metaphysics, which considers the reality of a world beyond the natural world and science. Because it is based on metaphysics and is therefore unverifiable, Ayer denounced religious language, as well as statements about ethics or aesthetics, as meaningless. Ayer challenged the meaningfulness of all statements about God – theistic, atheistic and agnostic – arguing that they are all equally meaningless because they all discuss the existence of a metaphysical, unverifiable being.

Austrian philosopher Ludwig Wittgenstein finished his Tractatus Logico-Philosophicus with the proposition that "Whereof one cannot speak, thereof one must be silent." Beverly and Brian Clack have suggested that because of this statement, Wittgenstein was taken for a positivist by many of his disciples because he made a distinction between what can and cannot be spoken about. They argue that this interpretation is inaccurate because Wittgenstein held the mystical, which cannot be described, as important. Rather than dismissing the mystical as meaningless, as the logical positivists did, Wittgenstein believed that while the facts of the world remain the same, the perspective from which they are viewed will vary.

=== Eschatological verification ===
Responding to the verification principle, John Hick used his parable of the Celestial City to describe his theory of eschatological verificationism. His parable is of two travellers, a theist and an atheist, together on a road. The theist believes that there is a Celestial City at the end of the road; the atheist believes that there is no end of the road. Hick's parable is an allegory of the Christian belief in an afterlife, which he argued can be verified upon death. Hick believed that eschatological verification is "unsymmetrical" because while it could be verified if it is true, it cannot be falsified if not. This is in contrast to ordinary "symmetrical" statements, which can be verified or falsified.

In his biography of Hick, David Cheetham notes a criticism of Hick's theory: waiting for eschatological verification could make religious belief provisional, preventing total commitment to faith. Cheetham argues that such criticism is misapplied because Hick's theory was not directed to religious believers but to philosophers, who argued that religion is unverifiable and therefore meaningless.

James Morris notes that Hick's eschatological verification theory has been criticised for being inconsistent with his belief in religious pluralism. Morris argues that such criticism can be overcome by modifying Hick's parable to include multiple travellers, all with different beliefs, on the road. He argues that even if some beliefs about life after death are unverifiable, Hick's belief in bodily resurrection can still be verified.

== Falsification ==
The falsification principle has been developed as an alternative theory by which it may be possible to distinguish between those religious statements that may potentially have meaning, and those that are meaningless. It proposes that most religious language is unfalsifiable because there is no way that it could be empirically proven false. In a landmark paper published in 1945, analytic philosopher Antony Flew argued that a meaningful statement must simultaneously assert and deny a state of affairs; for example, the statement "God loves us" both asserts that God loves us and denies that God does not love us. Flew maintained that if a religious believer could not say what circumstances would have to exist for their statements about God to be false, then they are unfalsifiable and meaningless.

Using John Wisdom's parable of the invisible gardener, Flew attempted to demonstrate that religious language is unfalsifiable. The parable tells the story of two people who discover a garden on a deserted island; one believes it is tended to by a gardener, the other believes that it formed naturally, without the existence of a gardener. The two watch out for the gardener but never find him; the non-believer consequently maintains that there is no gardener, whereas the believer rationalises the non-appearance by suggesting that the gardener is invisible and cannot be detected. Flew contended that if the believer's interpretation is accepted, nothing is left of the original gardener. He argued that religious believers tend to adopt counterpart rationalisations in response to any apparent challenge to their beliefs from empirical evidence; and these beliefs consequently suffer a "death by a thousand qualifications" as they are qualified and modified so much that they end up asserting nothing meaningful. Flew applied his principles to religious claims such as God's love for humans, arguing that if they are meaningful assertions they would deny a certain state of affairs. He argued that when faced with evidence against the existence of a loving God, such as the terminal illness of a child, theists will qualify their claims to allow for such evidence; for example they may suggest that God's love is different from human love. Such qualifications, Flew argued, make the original proposition meaningless; he questioned what God's love actually promises and what it guarantees against, and proposed that God's qualified love promises nothing and becomes worthless.

Flew continued in many subsequent publications to maintain the falsifiability criterion for meaning; but in later life retracted the specific assertion in his 1945 paper that all religious language is unfalsifiable, and so meaningless. Drawing specifically on the emerging science of molecular genetics (which had not existed at the time of his original paper), Flew eventually became convinced that the complexity this revealed in the mechanisms of biological reproduction might not be consistent with the time known to have been available for evolution on Earth to have happened; and that this potentially suggested a valid empirical test by which the assertion "that there is no creator God" might be falsified; "the latest work I have seen shows that the present physical universe gives too little time for these theories of abiogenesis to get the job done."

=== Responses ===
==== R. M. Hare ====
In response to Flew's falsification principle, British philosopher R. M. Hare told a parable in an attempt to demonstrate that religious language is meaningful. Hare described a lunatic who believes that all university professors want to kill him; no amount of evidence of kindly professors will dissuade him from this view. Hare called this kind of unfalsifiable conviction a "blik", and argued that it formed an unfalsifiable, yet still meaningful, worldview. He proposed that all people – religious and non-religious – hold bliks, and that they cannot be unseated by empirical evidence. Nevertheless, he maintained that a blik is meaningful because it forms the basis of a person's understanding of the world. Hare believed that some bliks are correct and others are not, though he did not propose a method of distinguishing between the two.

==== Basil Mitchell ====
Basil Mitchell responded to Flew's falsification principle with his own parable. He described an underground resistance soldier who meets a stranger who claims to be leading the resistance movement. The stranger tells the soldier to keep faith in him, even if he is seen to be fighting for the other side. The soldier's faith is regularly tested as he observes the stranger fighting for both sides, but his faith remains strong. Mitchell's parable teaches that although evidence can challenge a religious belief, a believer still has reason to hold their views. He argued that although a believer will not allow anything to count decisively against his beliefs, the theist still accepts the existence of evidence which could count against religious belief.

== Language games ==
Ludwig Wittgenstein's theory of language games likened the differences between different linguistic contexts to the differences between games. Just as there are many different games, each with their own rules, so there are many different forms of language. Wittgenstein argued that different forms of language have different rules which determine what makes a proposition meaningful; propositions can only be meaningful in the context of the language game in which they are uttered. As examples of language games, Wittgenstein suggests: "Asking, thanking, greeting, cursing, praying".

It is as if someone were to say: 'A game consists of moving objects about on a surface according to certain rules...' – and we replied: You seem to be thinking of board games, but there are others.

— Ludwig Wittgenstein, Philosophical Investigations

Wittgenstein believed that religion is significant because it offers a particular way of life, rather than confirming the existence of God. He therefore believed that religious language is confessional – a confession of what someone feels and believes – rather than consisting of claims to truth. Wittgenstein believed that religious language is different from language used to describe physical objects because it occupies a different language game.

Various philosophers – including Norman Malcolm, Peter Winch, D. Z. Phillips, and Rush Rhees – have interpreted Wittgenstein as advocating a kind of fideism regarding religion. Such a fideism would imply that religious statements are only meaningful within a religious form of life and thus cannot be criticized from outside religion. However, Gordon Graham argues that to call this position Wittgensteinian is misleading. As Graham argues, the types of thing Wittgenstein gives as examples of language games include singing, making jokes, thanking, greeting, and so on; nothing as broad as religion is included. Religious language includes many language games but, Graham argues, it is a mistake to regard religion as a whole as a language game.

Peter Donovan criticises the language-games approach for failing to recognise that religions operate in a world containing other ideas and that many religious people make claims to truth. He notes that many religious believers not only believe their religion to be meaningful and true in its own context, but claim that it is true against all other possible beliefs; if the language games analogy is accepted, such a comparison between beliefs is impossible. Donovan proposes that debates between different religions, and the apologetics of some, demonstrates that they interact with each other and the wider world and so cannot be treated as isolated language games.

== Alternative explanations of religious language ==
=== Political ===
Islamic philosopher Carl Ernst has argued that religious language is often political, especially in the public sphere, and that its purpose is to persuade people and establish authority, as well as convey information. He explains that the modern criticisms of the West made by some sections of Islam are an ideological reaction to colonialism, which intentionally uses the same language as colonialists. Ernst argues that when it is used rhetorically, religious language cannot be taken at face value because of its political implications.

=== Performative ===
Peter Donovan argues that most religious language is not about making truth-claims; instead, it is used to achieve certain goals. He notes that language can be used in alternative ways beyond making statements of fact, such as expressing feelings or asking questions. Donovan calls many of these uses performative, as they serve to perform a certain function within religious life. For example, the words "I promise" perform the action of promising themselves – Donovan argues that most religious language fulfils this function. Ludwig Wittgenstein also proposed that language could be performative and presented a list of the different uses of language. Wittgenstein argued that "the meaning of the language is in the use", taking the use of language to be performative. The philosopher J. L. Austin argued that religious language is not just cognitive but can perform social acts, including vows, blessings, and the naming of children. He distinguished performative statements as those that do not simply describe a state of affairs, but bring them about. Historian of religion Benjamin Ray uses the performance of rituals within religions as evidence for a performative interpretation of language. He argues that the language of rituals can perform social tasks: when a priest announces that a spiritual event has occurred, those present believe it because of the spiritual authority of the priest. He believed that the meaning of a ritual is defined by the language used by the speaker, who is defined culturally as a superhuman agent.

=== Imperative ===
British philosopher R. B. Braithwaite attempted to approach religious language empirically and adopted Wittgenstein's idea of "meaning as use". He likened religious statements to moral statements because they are both non-descriptive yet still have a use and a meaning; they do not describe the world, but the believer's attitudes towards it. Braithwaite believed that the main difference between a religious and a moral statement was that religious statements are part of a linguistic system of stories, metaphors, and parables.

Professor Nathan Katz writes of the analogy of a burning building, used by the Buddha in the Lotus Sutra, which casts religious language as imperative. In the analogy, a father sees his children at the top of a burning building. He persuades them to leave, but only by promising them toys if they leave. Katz argues that the message of the parable is not that the Buddha has been telling lies; rather, he believes that the Buddha was illustrating the imperative use of language. Katz believes that religious language is an imperative and an invitation, rather than a truth-claim.

== See also ==
- Theological noncognitivism

== Bibliography ==
- Allen, Diogenes (1992). Primary Readings in Philosophy for Understanding Theology. Westminster John Knox Press. ISBN 978-0-664-25208-3.
- Attfield, Robin (2006). Creation, evolution and meaning. Ashgate Publishing. ISBN 978-0-7546-0475-4.
- Bowie, Robert (2002). Philosophy of Religion & Religious Ethics: Study. Nelson Thornes. ISBN 978-0-7487-8081-5.
- Brenner, Williams (1999). Wittgenstein's philosophical investigations. State University of New York Press. ISBN 978-0-7914-4202-9.
- Bunnin, Nicholas; Tsui-James, E. P. (2003). The Blackwell Companion to Philosophy. John Wiley & Sons. ISBN 0-631-21908-0.
- Cahalan, John (1985). Causal realism: an essay on philosophical method and the foundations of knowledge. John C. Cahalan. ISBN 978-0-8191-4622-9.
- Cheetham, David (2003). John Hick: a critical introduction and reflection. Ashgate Publishing. ISBN 978-0-7546-1599-6.
- Clack, Brian (1999). An introduction to Wittgenstein's philosophy of religion. Edinburgh University Press. ISBN 978-0-7486-0939-0.
- Clack, Brian; Clack, Beverley (1998). The philosophy of religion: a critical introduction. Wiley-Blackwell. ISBN 978-0-7456-1738-1.
- Clack, Brian; Clack, Beverley (2008). Philosophy of Religion. Polity. ISBN 978-0-7456-3868-3.
- Clarke, P. J. (2001). Questions About God: A Guide for Students. Nelson Thornes. ISBN 978-0-7487-6554-6.
- Cooper, John Charles (1997). The 'spiritual presence' in the theology of Paul Tillich: Tillich's use of St. Paul. Mercer University Press. ISBN 978-0-86554-535-9.
- Cooper, John W. (2006). Panentheism, the Other God of the Philosophers: From Plato to the Present. Baker Academic. ISBN 978-0-8010-2724-6.
- Depoortere, Frederiek; van Erp, Stephan; Boeve, Lieven (2010). Edward Schillebeeckx and Contemporary Theology. Continuum International Publishing Group. ISBN 978-0-567-18160-2.
- Davies, Brian (2004). An Introduction to the Philosophy of Religious Language. Oxford University Press. ISBN 978-0-19-926347-9.
- Donovan, Peter (1982). Religious Language. Sheldon Press. ISBN 0-85969-054-7.
- Dourley, John (1975). Paul Tillich and Bonaventure: An Evaluation of Tillich's Claim to Stand in the Augustinian-Franciscan Tradition. Brill Archive. ISBN 978-90-04-04266-7.
- Dray, Stephen P. (2002). From Consensus to Chaos: An Historical Analysis of Evangelical Interpretation of 1 Timothy 2:8–15 from 1945–2001. Universal-Publishers. ISBN 9781581123500.
- Dupré, Louis (2000). Symbols of the Sacred. Wm. B. Eerdmans Publishing. ISBN 978-0-8028-4748-5.
- Ernst, Carl (2004). Following Muhammad: Rethinking Islam in the Contemporary World. University of North Carolina Press. ISBN 978-0-8078-5577-5.
- Evans, C. Stephen (1985). Philosophy of religion: thinking about faith. InterVarsity Press. ISBN 978-0-87784-343-6.
- Flew, Antony (2007). There is a God: How the World's Most Notorious Atheist Changed His Mind. New York: Harper One.
- Glock, Hans-Johann (1996). A Wittgenstein dictionary. Wiley-Blackwell. ISBN 978-0-631-18537-6.
- Graham, Gordon (2014). Wittgenstein and Natural Religion. Oxford University Press. ISBN 9780198713975.
- Griffiths, Paul; Taliaferro, Charles (2003). Philosophy of religion: an anthology. Wiley-Blackwell. ISBN 978-0-631-21471-7.
- Harris, James Franklin (2002). Analytic philosophy of religion. Springer. ISBN 978-1-4020-0530-5.
- Hebblethwaite, Brian (1987). The Incarnation: Collected Essays in Christology. Cambridge University Press. ISBN 978-0-521-33640-6.
- Hoffman, Thomas (2007). The Poetic Qurʼān: Studies on Qurʼānic Poeticity. Otto Harrassowitz Verlag. ISBN 978-3-447-05515-4.
- Horn, Patrick Rogers (2005). Gadamer and Wittgenstein on the unity of language: reality and discourse without metaphysics. Ashgate Publishing. ISBN 978-0-7546-0969-8.
- Hyman, Arthur (2008). Maimonidean studies, Volume 5. KTAV Publishing House. ISBN 978-0-88125-941-4.
- Jones, Michael (2006). The metaphysics of religion: Lucian Blaga and contemporary philosophy. Fairleigh Dickinson Univ Press. ISBN 978-0-8386-4100-2.
- Katz, Nathan (1982). Buddhist Images of Human Perfection: The Arahant of the Sutta Piṭaka Compared with the Bodhisattva and the Mahāsiddha. Motilal Banarsidass. ISBN 978-81-208-0647-4.
- Labron, Tim (2006). Wittgenstein's Religious Point of View. Continuum International Publishing Group. ISBN 978-0-8264-9027-8.
- Lawson, E. Thomas; McCauley, Robert (1993). Rethinking Religion: Connecting Cognition and Culture. Cambridge University Press. ISBN 978-0-521-43806-3.
- Levin, Leonard; Schweid, Eliezer (2008). The classic Jewish philosophers: from Saadia through the Renaissance. Brill Publishers. ISBN 978-90-04-16213-6.
- Lumsden, Robert (2009). Reading literature after deconstruction. Cambria Press. ISBN 978-1-60497-526-0.
- Mbogu, Nicholas Ibeawuchi (2008). Christology and Religious Pluralism: A Review of John Hick's Theocentric Model of Christology and the Emergence of African Inculturation Christologies. LIT Verlag Münster. ISBN 978-3-8258-9942-4.
- McFague, Sallie (1982). Metaphorical Theology: Models of God in Religious Language. Fortress Press. ISBN 978-0-8006-1687-8.
- McGrath, Alister (1998). The foundations of dialogue in science and religion. Wiley-Blackwell. ISBN 978-0-631-20854-9.
- McGrath, Aliser (2011). Science and Religion: A New Introduction. John Wiley & Sons. ISBN 978-1-4443-5808-7.
- Oppy, Graham; Scott, Michael (2010). Reading Philosophy of Religion. John Wiley & Sons. ISBN 978-1-4051-7082-6.
- Paden, William (1994). Religious Worlds: The Comparative Study of Religion. Beacon Press. ISBN 978-0-8070-1229-1.
- Pasewark, Kyle; Pool, Jeff (1999). The theology of Langdon B. Gilkey: systematic and critical studies. Mercer University Press. ISBN 978-0-86554-643-1.
- Polkinghorne, John (2003). The God of Hope and the End of the World. Yale University Press. ISBN 978-0-300-09855-6.
- Rees, Frank (2001). Wrestling With Doubt: Theological Reflections on the Journey of Faith. Liturgical Press. ISBN 978-0-8146-2590-3.
- Robinson, Douglas (2003). Performative Linguistics: Speaking and Translating As Doing Things With Words. Psychology Press. ISBN 978-0-415-30036-0.
- Rocca, Gregory (2004). Speaking the Incomprehensible God: Thomas Aquinas on the Interplay of Positive and Negative Theology. Catholic University of America Press. ISBN 978-0-8132-1367-5.
- Scott, Michael (2017). "Religious Language". In Zalta, Edward N. (ed.). The Stanford Encyclopedia of Philosophy (Winter 2017 Edition).
- Seeskin, Kenneth (2005). The Cambridge companion to Maimonides. Cambridge University Press. ISBN 978-0-521-81974-9.
- Sherratt, Yvonne (2006). Continental Philosophy of Social Science: Hermeneutics, Genealogy and Critical Theory from Ancient Greece to the Twenty-first Century. Cambridge University Press. ISBN 978-0-521-85469-6.
- Singh, Nirbhai (1990). Philosophy of Sikhism: Reality and Its Manifestations. Atlantic Publishers & Distri. ISBN 978-99906-602-3-4.
- Tracy, David (1996). Blessed rage for order: the new pluralism in theology : with a new preface. University of Chicago Press. ISBN 978-0-226-81129-1.
- Weed, Jennifer Hart (February 19, 2007). "Religious Language". In Fieser, James; Dowden, Bradley (eds.). Internet Encyclopedia of Philosophy. ISSN 2161-0002.
- Weinberg, Julius (2001). An Examination of Logical Positivism, Volume 8. Routledge. ISBN 978-0-415-22549-6.
- White, Roger (2010). Talking about God: the concept of analogy and the problem of religious language. Ashgate Publishing. ISBN 978-1-4094-0036-3.
