= Mark Addis =

British philosopher (born 1969)

Mark Addis FRSA
- Born: 1969 (age 56–57); Bolton, United Kingdom

Philosophical work
- Main interests: Ludwig Wittgenstein

Mark Addis FRSA (b. 1969) is a British philosopher who is known for his work on Ludwig Wittgenstein.

== Biography ==
Addis grew up in Bolton, England, and was educated at Bolton School, Mansfield College, Oxford, the University of Leeds, the University of York and Birmingham City University.

As of 2026 Addis is Senior Lecturer in Education at The Open University. Earlier, he was Professor of Philosophy at the Birmingham City University.

He has been a visiting scholar at Georgia State University, US (2005) and at Aarhus University, Denmark. Addis has since 2006 been general editor of the Philosophy Insights series for Humanities-Ebooks LLP. He was treasurer of the British Philosophical Association. Addis was a consultant for the film Le Week-End.

Addis specialises in the philosophy of Wittgenstein and related areas as well as having research interests in the philosophies of language, mind, and religion. His book Wittgenstein: Making Sense of Other Minds (1999) was described by Rom Harre as "a careful and subtle study" whose "scholarly merits are great". Wittgenstein and Philosophy of Religion (2001, co-edited with Robert Arrington) is "an interesting and valuable collection of essays", while Wittgenstein: A Guide for the Perplexed (2006) is "a clear, balanced and very recommendable book which gives a good idea of the complexity of Wittgenstein's philosophy".

== Bibliography ==
=== Monographs ===
- Wittgenstein : Making Sense of Other Minds (Aldershot: Ashgate, 1999). ISBN 0754610438
- Wittgenstein: A Guide for the Perplexed (London: Continuum, 2006). ISBN 0-8264-8495-6 (hbk), 0-8264-8496-4 (pbk)

=== Edited collections ===
- Arrington, Robert; ———, eds. (2001). Wittgenstein and philosophy of religion. London ; New York: Routledge. ISBN 0-415-21780-6.
- ———; Lane, Peter C. R.; Sozou, Peter D.; Gobet, Fernand, eds. (2019). Scientific Discovery in the Social Sciences. Cham: Springer International Publishing AG. ISBN 978-3030237691.
- Winch, Christopher; ———, eds. (2019). Education and expertise. Hoboken, New Jersey: Wiley. ISBN 9781119527213.

=== Essays and chapters ===
- 'D. Z. Phillips' Fideism in Wittgenstein's Mirror', in Wittgenstein and Philosophy of Religion pp. 85–100
- 'Wittgenstein and the Transfinite in Set Theory', in Klaus Puhl, ed., Wittgenstein's Philosophy of Mathematics (Vienna: Holder-Pichler-Tempsky, 1993), pp. 87–92. ISBN 3-209-01592-9
- Entries on Reuben Louis Goodstein pp. 336–7, Margeret Macdonald pp. 601–5, Margeret Masterman pp. 664–5, and David Pears pp. 756–60 in Stuart Brown, ed., Dictionary of Twentieth-Century British Philosophers (Bristol: Thoemmes Press, 2005). ISBN 1-84371-096-X (Reprinted in A.C. Grayling, Andrew Pyle, Naomi Goulder eds., Continuum Encyclopedia of British Philosophy (Thoemmes Continuum, London 2006), as Goodstein pp. 1256–7, MacDonald pp. 1997–8, Masterman p. 2104, and Pears pp. 2454–7. ISBN 1-84371-141-9)
- 'Intellectual Property and the Public Interest', in The International Journal of the Book 6:1 (2009), pp. 121–124. ISSN 1447-9516
- 'Wittgenstein's Private Language Argument and Self Consciousness', in Sats-Nordic Journal of Philosophy 8:2 (2007), pp. 89–103. ISSN 1600-1974 (Reprinted in Analysis and Metaphysics 6 (Dec. 2007), pp. 288–302. ISSN 1584-0778)
- 'Criteria: the State of the Debate', in Journal of Philosophical Research XX (1995), pp. 139–174. ISSN 1053-8364
- 'Surveyability and the Sorites Paradox', in Philosophia Mathematica 3:2 (1995), pp. 157–165. ISSN 0031-8019
- 'Philosophy in the Workplace', in Philosophy Now 95 (2013)
