= H. G. Wood Professor of Theology =

The H.G. Wood Professor of the Philosophy of Religion (formerly known as H.G. Wood Professor of Theology) is a chair at the University of Birmingham associated with the School of Philosophy, Theology and Religion. The chair was established in 1961 and named after a Quaker theologian H. G. Wood at Birmingham. The first post-holder was Ninian Smart, who was succeeded by John Hick. Along with Nolloth Professor of the Philosophy of the Christian Religion at Oxford and Norris–Hulse Professor of Divinity at Cambridge it is one of three main endowed chairs in the UK focusing on philosophy of religion.

== List of H. G. Wood Professors ==
Year	Name	Ref
1961–1967	Ninian Smart	
1967–1982	John Hick	
1982–1995	Vacant	
1995–1999	Denys Turner	
1999–2010	Markus Vinzent	
2010–2019	Stephen Pattison	
2019–present	Yujin Nagasawa	
