= Religious language =

Religious language may refer to:

- Sacred language
- Problem of religious language
- Category:Religious terminology
