= Routledge Philosophy Guidebook to Hegel and the Phenomenology of Spirit =

2002 book by Robert Stern

- Authors: Robert Stern
- Language: English
- Subject: Hegel
- Publisher: Routledge
- Publication date: 2002
- Publication place: United Kingdom
- Media type: Print (Hardcover and Paperback)
- Pages: 234
- ISBN: 9780203205044

Routledge Philosophy Guidebook to Hegel and the Phenomenology of Spirit is a 2002 book by the philosopher Robert Stern, in which the author provides an introduction to The Phenomenology of Spirit by Hegel.

== Reception ==
Simon Lumsden and Terry Pinkard have reviewed the book. A review of the Persian translation of the book has been published in the PTMBR.
