= Espen Hammer =

Norwegian philosopher

- Born: Oslo, Norway

Academic background
- Education: New School for Social Research (PhD), Columbia University (MA)
- Thesis: Reclaiming the Ordinary: Towards a Critique of Discourse Ethics (1995)
- Doctoral advisor: Richard Bernstein, Seyla Benhabib

Academic work
- Era: Contemporary philosophy
- Region: Western philosophy
- School or tradition: German Idealism
- Institutions: Temple University

Espen Hammer (born 1966) is Professor of Philosophy at Temple University. Focusing on modern European thought from Kant and Hegel to Adorno and Heidegger, Hammer’s research includes critical theory, Wittgenstein and ordinary language philosophy, phenomenology, German idealism, social and political theory, and aesthetics. He has also written widely on the philosophy of literature and taken a special interest in the question of temporality.

== Biography ==
Born in Oslo, in 1966, Hammer received his basic education, including a Bachelor of Arts degree (1989) and a Magister degree (1992) from University of Oslo, in Norway. After a year as DAAD-fellow at the universities of Heidelberg and Frankfurt, Hammer, then a Fulbright Fellow, received his Master of Arts degree (1991) in philosophy from Columbia University, where he studied with, among others, Charles Larmore and Sidney Morgenbesser. In 1995, having studied with, among others, Yirmiyahu Yovel, Seyla Benhabib, Reinhart Koselleck, and Richard Bernstein, he received his PhD degree in philosophy from the New School for Social Research.

Hammer has competed in four world championships of sailing, most recently in the 2018 Hague Offshore Sailing World Championship. His brother Øyvind Hammer is Professor of Paleontology at the University of Oslo. He currently lives in Philadelphia and is married to the philosopher Kristin Gjesdal with whom he has two children.

== Career ==
After a period as Humboldt-Fellow at the University of Frankfurt, working with Axel Honneth, and as Associate and later full Professor of Philosophy at the University of Oslo, Hammer spent seven years (1998-2005) as Lecturer and later Reader in the Department of Philosophy at the University of Essex. From 2006 to 2008 he was a Recurrent Visiting Professor at the Center for the Study of Cultural Complexity, University of Oslo. Between 2005 and 2009 he served as Visiting Professor of Philosophy at Temple University, The New School, and University of Pennsylvania before, in 2009, becoming Professor of Philosophy at Temple University. Since 2021 he has chaired the Philosophy Department at Temple.

In 1995, Hammer published a Norwegian translation of Immanuel Kant’s Kritik der Urteilskraft.

His first book, Stanley Cavell: Skepticism, Subjectivity, and the Ordinary (Polity Press, 2002) analyzes the philosophy of Stanley Cavell in the context of Wittgenstein, ordinary language philosophy, and the question of selfhood.

In Adorno and the Political (Routledge, 2005), Hammer reconstructs the often neglected political dimension of Theodor W. Adorno’s thought. As opposed to a widespread view of this philosopher as an apolitical aesthete, Hammer shows how important the political is for his work, and how political questions influence both his theoretical contributions and his social involvement.

A more recent monograph, Philosophy and Temporality from Kant to Critical Theory (Cambridge University Press, 2011), reinterprets central figures from the European philosophical tradition, including Kant, Hegel, Schopenhauer, Nietzsche, and Adorno in terms of their views of temporality. It is claimed that with the onset of modernity, lived time engenders a sense of crisis focused on existential meaning and transitoriness. While recognizing this crisis, these thinkers each present recommendations for how this crisis should be tackled. The study demonstrates Hammer’s interest in re-reading the canon from the vantage-point of the question of modernity and modernization. For the publication, Hammer was granted the 2012 Canadian Society for Continental Philosophy Symposium Book Award.

Hammer’s subsequent book, Adorno’s Modernism: Art, Experience, and Catastrophe (Cambridge University Press, 2015) is a comprehensive study of Theodor W. Adorno’s aesthetics and its relation to metaphysics, politics, and culture.

After the Death of God: Secularization as a Philosophical Challenge from Kant to Nietzsche, a study of secularization and philosophy of religion in the post-Kantian tradition, is published by the University of Chicago Press (2025). His Routledge Guidebook to Horkheimer and Adorno’s Dialectic of Enlightenment, co-authored with Fred Rush, came out in 2025.

Hammer is the editor of German Idealism: Contemporary Perspectives (Routledge, 2005), Theodor W. Adorno II: Critical Assessments of Leading Philosophers (Routledge, 2015), and Kafka’s The Trial: Philosophical Perspectives (Oxford University Press, 2018). With Peter Gordon and Axel Honneth, he edited The Routledge Companion to the Frankfurt School (2018). With Peter Gordon and Max Pensky he edited A Companion to Adorno (Wiley-Blackwell, 2020). He has also co-edited two German books: Stanley Cavell: Die Unheimlichkeit des Gewöhnlichen (Fischer Verlag, 2002) and Pragmatik und Hermeneutik: Studien zur Kulturpolitik Richard Rortys (Felix Meiner Verlag, 2011).

Hammer has published four Norwegian monographs: Adorno (Gyldendal, 2002), Det indre mørke. Et essay om melankoli (Universitetsforlaget, 2004, translated into Swedish, Russian, and Serbian), Anstendighet og revolt: Noen betraktninger omkring Dag Solstads forfatterskap (Oktober, 2011), and USA. En supermakt i krise (Kagge, 2021). In USA. En supermakt i krise, he analyzes the causes of American political polarization.

He is a frequent contributor to public debate and has several times written for New York Times’ The Stone. From 1990 to 1996 he co-edited the Norwegian journal of philosophy Agora.

== Selected bibliography ==
- “Wittgenstein and the Prospects for a Contemporary Literary Criticism,” in Robert Chodat and John Gibson (eds.), Wittgenstein and Literary Studies (New York: Cambridge University Press, 2023), 104-25.
- “Rorty’s Approach to Kant and Hegel,” in Martin Mueller (ed.), Handbuch Richard Rorty (Berlin: Springer Verlag, 2023).
- “The Sixties,” in Lydia Goehr and Jonathan Gilmore (eds.), A Companion to Arthur C. Danto (Oxford: Wiley-Blackwell, 2022), 161-68.
- “Critical Theory,” in C. M. van den Akker, The Routledge Companion to Historical Theory (New York: Routledge, 2021), 98-112.
- “Logic and Voice: Stanley Cavell on Analytic Philosophy,” in Journal for the History of Analytical Philosophy 9: 9 (2021): 105-118.
- “Critical Theory and the Challenge of Relativism,” in Martin Kusch (ed.), Routledge Handbook to Relativism (New York: Routledge, 2020), 247-55.
- “The Antinomy of Modernism and Anti-Modernism in Adorno’s Negative Dialectics,” in Paul Giladi (ed.), Hegel and the Frankfurt School: Traditions in Dialogue (New York: Routledge, 2021), pp. 33–52.
- “Adorno’s Critique of Heidegger,” in Max Pensky, Peter Gordon and Espen Hammer (eds.), A Companion to Adorno (Oxford: Wiley-Blackwell, 2020), pp. 473–87.
- “Ideology and Experience: The Legacy of Critical Theory,” in Noel Carroll, Shawn Lot and Laura Teresa Di Summa-Knoop (eds.), The Palgrave Handbook for the Philosophy of Film and Motion Pictures (New York: Palgrave Macmillan, 2019), 315-34.
- “Dewey, Adorno, and the Purpose of Art,” in Steven Fesmire (ed.), Oxford Handbook of Dewey (New York: Oxford University Press, 2019), pp. 471–88.
- “Reason, Agency, and History: Remarks on Kant and Benjamin, in History and Theory 57:3 (2018), pp. 426-30.
- “Kafka’s Modernism: Intelligibility and Voice in The Trial,” in Espen Hammer (ed.), Kafka’s The Trial: Philosophical Perspectives (New York: Oxford University Press, 2018), pp. 227–52.
- “Habermas and Ordinary Language Philosophy,” in Peter Gordon, Axel Honneth and Espen Hammer (eds.), The Routledge Companion to the Frankfurt School (New York: Routledge, 2018), pp. 336–48.
- “Literatur, Fiktionalität und Wirklichkeit,” in Gertrud Koch and Thomas Hilgers (eds.), Perspektive und Fiktion (Munich: Wilhelm Fink Verlag, 2017), pp. 139–58.
- “Husserl and the Inner-Outer Distinction,” in Marcia Morgan and Megan Craig (eds.), Richard J. Bernstein and the Expansion of American Philosophy: Thinking the Plural (London: Lexington Books, 2017), pp. 141–56.
- “Experience and Temporality: Towards a New Paradigm of Critical Theory,” in Michael J. Thompson (ed.), Palgrave Handbook of Critical Theory (New York: Palgrave Macmillan, 2017), pp. 613–30.
- “Epistemology and Self-Reflection in the Young Marx,” in Kristin Gjesdal (ed.), Key Debates in Nineteenth Century Philosophy (London and New York: Routledge, 2016), pp. 275–86.
- “Happiness and Pleasure in Adorno’s Aesthetics,” Germanic Review 4:9 (2015): 247-59.
- Adorno’s Modernism: Art, Experience, and Catastrophe (Cambridge and New York: Cambridge University Press, 2015). ISBN 9781107121591
- “Literature and Politics,” in Noel Carrol and John Gibson (eds.), The Routledge Companion to Philosophy of Literature (London and New York: Routledge, 2015), pp. 451–61.
- “Hegel as a Theorist of Secularization,” in Hegel Bulletin 67:2 (2013): 223-44.
- Philosophy and Temporality from Kant to Critical Theory (Cambridge and New York: Cambridge University Press, 2011). ISBN 978-1-107-00500-6
- Adorno and the Political (London/New York: Routledge, 2005). ISBN 0-415-28913-0
- Stanley Cavell: Skepticism, Subjectivity, and the Ordinary (Oxford: Polity Press, 2002). ISBN 0-7456-2358-1
