= Maria Rosa Antognazza =

Italian-British philosopher (1964–2023)

- Born: 10 September 1964; Tradate, Italy
- Died: 28 March 2023 (aged 58); Oxford, UK
- Spouse: Howard Hotson
- Awards: Member of the Academia Europaea (MEA), 2022

Academic background
- Education: Università Cattolica del Sacro Cuore
- Doctoral advisor: Mario Sina

Academic work
- Discipline: Philosophy
- Sub-discipline: Epistemology; history of philosophy; philosophy of religion
- Institutions: University of Aberdeen; King's College, London
- Main interests: History of philosophy, especially Gottfried Wilhelm Leibniz; epistemology, especially knowledge and belief; philosophy of religion

Maria Rosa Antognazza (10 September 1964 – 28 March 2023) was an Italian-British philosopher, who was professor of philosophy at King's College London.

== Life and career ==
Antognazza was educated at the Catholic University of Milan. She held research fellowships and visiting professorships in Italy, Germany, Israel, Great Britain, Switzerland, and the USA. Among these were a British Academy Postdoctoral Fellowship, a two-year Leverhulme Trust research fellowship, and in 2016 she was the Leibniz-Professor at the University of Leipzig. She held the 2019–2020 Mind Senior Research Fellowship for work on her book Thinking with Assent: Renewing a Traditional Account of Knowledge and Belief.

Antognazza was head of the King's philosophy department from 2011/12 to 2014/15. She was the chair of the British Society for the History of Philosophy and the president of the British Society for the Philosophy of Religion.

In 2010, Antognazza won the Pfizer Award from the History of Science Society for the best recently published book in the history of science: Leibniz: An Intellectual Biography (Cambridge University Press, 2008). She was elected to Leibniz Professorship at Leipzig University for the 300th Anniversary of Leibniz’s death in 2016. In 2021, she was the Scots Philosophical Association Centenary Fellow at the University of St Andrews. In 2022 she was elected Member of the Academia Europaea, Europe's transnational academic of the arts and sciences.

Antognazza was married to British historian Howard Hotson with whom she raised three children: John, Sophia, and Francesca. She died on 28 March 2023, aged 58.

== Selected publications ==
=== Single-authored ===
- Thinking with Assent: Renewing a Traditional Account of Knowledge and Belief (Oxford University Press)
- Leibniz: A Very Short Introduction (Oxford: Oxford University Press, 2016)
- Leibniz: An Intellectual Biography (Cambridge: Cambridge University Press, 2009; winner of the 2010 Pfizer Award)
- Leibniz on the Trinity and the Incarnation: Reason and Revelation in the Seventeenth Century (New Haven: Yale University Press, 2007).

=== Edited volume ===
- The Oxford Handbook of Leibniz. Oxford: Oxford University Press, 2018.

Professional and academic associations
Preceded by Yujin Nagasawa	President of the British Society for the Philosophy of Religion; 2019–2023	Succeeded by Clare Carlisle
Awards
Preceded by Harold J. Cook	Pfizer Award; 2010	Succeeded by Eleanor Robson
