= Shojaee =

Shojaee or Shojaei (Persian: شجاعی) is an Iranian surname. It may refer to:

- Seyyed Mahdi Shojaee, Iranian author, novelist, journalist and screenwriter
- Malek Shojaee, Iranian philosopher
- Ali Shojaei (footballer, born 1953)
- Ali Shojaei (footballer, born 1997)
- Masoud Shojaei, Iranian footballer
- Mostafa Shojaei, Iranian footballer
- Zahra Shojaei, Iranian politician
