= H. G. Wood =

British theologian and academic (1879-1963)

Herbert George Wood
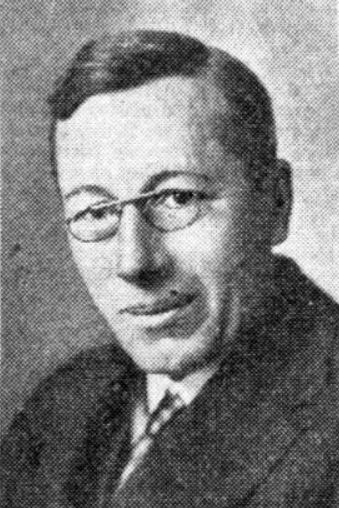
- Born: 2 September 1879
- Died: 9 March 1963 (aged 83)
- Occupations: Theologian, academic

Herbert George Wood (2 September 1879 – 9 March 1963), best known as H. G. Wood, was a British theologian and academic.

== Academic career ==
Wood was educated at City of London School and Jesus College, Cambridge, where he was appointed a fellow in 1904. He was a lecturer in the New Testament from 1910 to 1940 at Woodbrooke College. At the University of Birmingham, he was the first Edward Cadbury Professor of Theology, holding the chair from 1940 to 1946, and was also Dean of the Faculty of Arts from 1943 to 1946.

He gave the 1933 Hulsean Lectures at the University of Cambridge. He was the first layman and the first Quaker to do so. He was President of the Studiorum Novi Testamenti Societas in 1957.

=== Christ myth theory ===
Wood argued for the historicity of Jesus and was an opponent of the Christ myth theory. He was the author of Did Christ Really Live? (1938). He debated mythicist J. M. Robertson.

Wood wrote that "All Christ-myth theorists start from a view of the gospels as discredited witnesses — a view which no scientific historian can accept and which rests on rationalist prejudice and sheer ignorance."

== H.G. Wood Chair ==
The H. G. Wood Professor of Theology is a chair at the University of Birmingham established in 1961. Its past post-holders include Ninian Smart, John Hick and Denys Turner.

== Publications ==
- Rationalism and Historical Criticism (1919)
- Living Issues in Religious Thought: From George Fox to Bertrand Russell (1924)
- The Truth and Error of Communism (1933)
- Christianity and the Nature of History (1934)
- Communism, Christian and Marxist (1935)
- Christianity and the Nature of History (1937)
- Did Christ Really Live? (1938)
- The Kingdom of God and History (1938)
- Christianity and Civilization (1942)
- Religious Liberty To Day (1949)
- Frederick Denison Maurice (1950)
- Belief and Unbelief Since 1850 (1954)
- Freedom and Necessity in History (1957)
- Jesus in the Twentieth Century (1960)
