= British Philosophical Association =

British organisation

- Abbreviation: BPA
- Formation: 2002
- Founders: Roger Trigg; Jonathan Wolff
- Legal status: Association
- Purpose: Educational
- President: Fiona Macpherson
- Director: Joe Morrison
- Treasurer: Stella Sandford

The British Philosophical Association (BPA) is a British organisation set up in October 2002 to promote the study of philosophy.

== Early history ==
During the early 1980s the merging of educational establishments and financial cut-backs meant that some philosophy departments had closed and more were under threat. The National Committee for Philosophy (NCP) was formed to try and address this. The committee was successful and, following on from their success sought to secure the future of the subject of philosophy in education.

The NCP evolved – after three years of discussion and planning – into the British Philosophical Association (BPA) and agreed its constitution, "to promote and foster the teaching and study of, and research in Philosophy in the United Kingdom, within higher education and also within the wider community", at a meeting in Liverpool 30 October 2002. The first annual meeting was held on 24 October 2003 at Westminster, in the House of Commons.

== Executive committee members ==
=== Previous ===
- President 2003–2004 Roger Trigg
- Secretary 2003–2007 Jonathan Wolff
- Treasurer 2008–2016 Mark Addis

=== Current ===
Current members are:

- President Fiona Macpherson
- Director Joe Morrison
- Executive Secretary Marthe Kerkwijk
- Treasurer Stella Sandford

=== Presidents ===
- 2003–2004: Roger Trigg
- 2004–2006: The Baroness O'Neill of Bengarve
- 2006–2009: Brad Hooker
- 2009–2012: M. M. McCabe
- 2012–2019: Robert Stern
- 2019–present: Fiona Macpherson

== Publications ==
- British Philosophical Association; Women in Philosophy (September 2011). Women in philosophy in the UK – a report by the British Philosophical Association and the Society for Women in Philosophy UK. (Helen Beebee and Jenny Saul). Joint BPA/SWIP Committee for Women in Philosophy. Archived from the original on 17 October 2013.
