= Roger Trigg =

British philosopher and Emeritus Professor (born 1941)

- Born: Roger Hugh Trigg; 14 August 1941 (age 85); Pontypridd, Wales
- Spouse: Julia Gibbs (m. 1972)

Academic background
- Education: New College, Oxford

Academic work
- Discipline: Philosophy
- Sub-discipline: Philosophy of religion; philosophical theology
- School or tradition: Analytic philosophy
- Institutions: University of Warwick; St Cross College, Oxford

Roger Hugh Trigg (born 14 August 1941) is a British philosopher and Emeritus Professor of Philosophy at the University of Warwick. He is known for his works on philosophy of religion. Trigg has been President of the Mind Association, Founding President of the British Society for the Philosophy of Religion, President of the European Society for Philosophy of Religion, and the first President of the British Philosophical Association.

Professional and academic associations
New office	President of the British Society for the Philosophy of Religion; 1993–1996	Succeeded by
Preceded by Dermot Moran	President of the Mind Association; 1997–1998	Succeeded by Paul Coates
New office	President of the British Philosophical Association; 2003–2004	Succeeded by The Baroness O'Neill of Bengarve
