= Robert Stern (philosopher) =

British philosopher (1962–2024)

Robert Stern FBA
- Born: Robert Arthur Stern; 28 February 1962; Norwich, England
- Died: 21 August 2024 (aged 62); Sheffield, England

Academic background
- Education: St John's College, Cambridge
- Thesis: Hegel and the structure of the whole: relation and unity in the philosophy of G.W.F. Hegel (1986)
- Academic advisors: Jonathan Lear, Gerd Buchdahl, Edward Craig

Academic work
- Discipline: Philosophy
- Institutions: St John's College, Cambridge; University of Sheffield
- Notable students: Paul Giladi, Thom Brooks
- Main interests: G. W. F. Hegel; Immanuel Kant
- Notable ideas: Revival of Hegelian critique of Kant

Robert Arthur Stern FBA (28 February 1962 – 21 August 2024), also known as Bob Stern, was a British philosopher who served as professor of philosophy at the University of Sheffield. He was an expert on the history of philosophy, particularly G. W. F. Hegel and Immanuel Kant. His later research focused on the Danish ethicist Knud Ejler Løgstrup.

== Biography ==
Stern was born on 28 February 1962. He graduated from St John's College, Cambridge, receiving his PhD with the dissertation Hegel and the structure of the whole: relation and unity in the philosophy of G.W.F. Hegel in 1986 and then became a research fellow there. Stern became a professor at the University of Sheffield in 2000, and was the head of the Department of Philosophy from 2004 to 2008.

He was on the editorial board of the European Journal of Philosophy, and was president of the British Philosophical Association. He was elected a Fellow of the British Academy in 2019.

Stern died from brain cancer on 21 August 2024, at the age of 62.

Stern offers a holistic reading of Hegel, examining his entire philosophical approach.

== Works ==
=== Books ===
- Stern, Robert (11 September 2002). Hegel, Kant and the Structure of the Object. Routledge. doi:10.4324/9780203006542. ISBN 978-1-134-97374-3.
- Stern, Robert (1993). G.W.F. Hegel: Critical Assessments. London New York: Routledge. ISBN 9780415072793.
- Stern, Robert (2000). Transcendental Arguments and Scepticism : Answering the Question of Justification. Oxford Oxford New York: Clarendon Press Oxford University Press. ISBN 9780198250531.
- Stern, Robert (2002). Routledge Philosophy Guidebook to Hegel and the Phenomenology of Spirit. London New York: Routledge. ISBN 9780203205044.
- Stern, Robert (2009). Hegelian Metaphysics. Oxford New York: Oxford University Press. ISBN 9780199239108.
- Stern, Robert (2012). Understanding Moral Obligation: Kant, Hegel, Kierkegaard. Cambridge New York: Cambridge University Press. ISBN 9781107012073.
- Stern, Robert (2013). The Routledge Guidebook to Hegel's Phenomenology of Spirit (second ed.). Abingdon, Oxon New York: Routledge. ISBN 9780415664455.
- Stern, Robert (2015). Kantian Ethics: Value, Agency, and Obligation. Oxford, New York: Oxford University Press. ISBN 9780191789113.
- Stern, Robert (2019). The Radical Demand in Løgstrup's Ethics. Oxford, New York: Oxford University Press. ISBN 9780191867453.

=== Journal articles ===
- Stern, Robert (1 February 2007). "Hegel, British Idealism, and the curious case of the concrete universal". British Journal for the History of Philosophy. 15 (1): 115–153. doi:10.1080/09608780601088002. ISSN 0960-8788.
- Stern, Robert (7 May 2009), "Hegel's Doppelsatz : A Neutral Reading", Hegelian Metaphysics (1 ed.), Oxford University PressOxford, pp. 81–114, doi:10.1093/acprof:oso/9780199239108.003.0004, ISBN 978-0-19-923910-8
- Stern, Robert (7 May 2009), "Peirce on Hegel: Nominalist or Realist?", Hegelian Metaphysics (1 ed.), Oxford University PressOxford, pp. 239–268, doi:10.1093/acprof:oso/9780199239108.003.0009, ISBN 978-0-19-923910-8
- Stern, Robert (1 March 2012). "Is Hegel's Master–Slave Dialectic a Refutation of Solipsism?". British Journal for the History of Philosophy. 20 (2): 333–361. doi:10.1080/09608788.2012.664026. ISSN 0960-8788.
- Stern, Robert (1 July 2013). "Hegel's Critique of Kant: From Dichotomy to Identity". British Journal for the History of Philosophy. 21 (4): 807–810. doi:10.1080/09608788.2013.792778. ISSN 0960-8788.

Professional and academic associations
Preceded by M. M. McCabe	President of the British Philosophical Association; 2012–2019	Succeeded by Fiona Macpherson
