= The Marriage Question =

2023 book by Clare Carlisle

The Marriage Question: George Eliot's Double Life
- Book cover
- Author: Clare Carlisle
- Language: English
- Subject: George Eliot
- Genre: Non-fiction, Biography, History, Philosophy
- Publisher: Allen Lane
- Publication date: 23 March 2023
- Pages: 400 (hardback)
- ISBN: 978-0-241-44717-8
- Website: Penguin Books

The Marriage Question: George Eliot's Double Life is a book written by Clare Carlisle and published by Allen Lane in 2023. The work explores the life and philosophy of Mary Anne Evans, known by her pen name George Eliot.

== Reviews ==
- Christiansen, R. (2023), "How a 'free bond of love' helped George Eliot escape the marriage trap", The Telegraph
- Fitz, Herbert, C. (2023), "What can we learn of George Eliot through her heroines?", The Spectator
- Goldsbrough, S. (2023), "The Marriage Question by Clare Carlisle review — was George Eliot's 'perfect' lover just a sponger?", The Times
- Hughes, K. (2023), "The Marriage Question by Clare Carlisle review – the lives and loves of George Eliot", The Guardian
- Jeffries, S. (2023), "The Marriage Question: George Eliot's Double Life review – one from the heart", The Guardian
- Kinch, D. P. (30 June 2023). "The marriage question: George Eliot's double life". Women's History Review. 32 (5). Routledge: 787–788. doi:10.1080/09612025.2023.2230043. ISSN 0961-2025. S2CID 259616767.
- "The Marriage Question — the fascinating doubleness of George Eliot", The Financial Times, 2023

== Citation ==
- Carlisle, C. (2023). The Marriage Question: George Eliot's Double Life. Allen Lane. ISBN 978-0-241-44717-8.

== About the author ==
Clare Carlisle is an author and philosopher. She completed her BA and PhD in philosophy and theology at Trinity College, Cambridge, and joined the faculty of King’s College London in 2011. She is the author of several notable works including On Habit published by Routledge in 2014, Philosopher of the Heart: The Restless Life of Søren Kierkegaard published by Allen Lane in 2019, and Spinoza’s Religion: A New Reading of the Ethics published by Princeton University Press in 2021.

== See also ==
- Victorian era
- Women in the Victorian era
