= British Society for the Philosophy of Religion =

Learned society

- Formation: 1993; 33 years ago
- Type: Learned society
- Registration no.: 1027548
- Region served: United Kingdom
- President: Vacant
- Affiliations: European Society for Philosophy of Religion
- Website: thebspr.org

The British Society for the Philosophy of Religion (BSPR) was founded in 1993 and is the United Kingdom's main forum for the interchange of ideas in the philosophy of religion.

The society holds a major conference in Britain every two years, devoted to a particular area of the subject. The programme of events for the society is decided at the general meeting held at the biennial conference. The planning of the programme is in the hands of the committee.

The BSPR is also affiliated to the European Society for Philosophy of Religion which holds a biennial conference in years alternating with the BSPR's conference.

== Presidents ==
- 1993–1996: Roger Trigg
- Richard Swinburne
- 2003–2005: Peter Byrne
- Basil Mitchell
- John Hick
- Paul Helm
- Brian Leftow
- 2007–2009: John Cottingham
- Robin Le Poidevin
- 2011–2013: Stephen R. L. Clark
- 2013–2015: Sarah Coakley
- 2015–2017: Mark Wynn
- 2017–2019: Yujin Nagasawa
- 2019–2023: Maria Rosa Antognazza
- 2024–Present: Clare Carlisle
