= Maurice Wiles =

Anglican priest and academic

Maurice Frank Wiles, FBA (17 October 1923 – 3 June 2005) was an Anglican priest and academic. He was the Regius Professor of Divinity at the University of Oxford from 1970 to 1991.

== Life and academic career ==
Wiles was educated at the Tonbridge School in Kent. He was awarded a scholarship at Christ's College, Cambridge, but his studies were interrupted by the war. He and his brother, Christopher John Wiles (1919–2014), were sent early in February 1942 to learn Japanese and cryptography at the secret Bedford Japanese School run by Captain Oswald Tuck RN. Both of them did well on the course and were posted to Bletchley Park. After a year in the Japanese Military Attaché section, Maurice became joint chief translator in the Japanese Forces section, while Christopher became chief translator in the Japanese military attaché section. After the war he returned to Christ's College and then continued his studies at Ridley Hall.

After ordination in 1950 he spent two years as curate at St George's, Stockport, but then returned to Ridley Hall as chaplain. From 1955 to 1959 he was a lecturer in New Testament Studies at the University of Ibadan, Nigeria. He again returned to Cambridge as dean of Clare College and university lecturer in early Christian doctrine. Before moving to Oxford as Regius Professor of Divinity he spent three years from 1967 to 1970 as professor of Christian doctrine at King's College London.

Wiles served as a director of the four-yearly Oxford International Conference on Patristic Studies from 1971 until 1999.

He was appointed a Fellow of King's College London in 1972 and Fellow of the British Academy in 1981.

== Miracles ==
In his work God's Action in the World, he discusses the notion of a world that is consistent with Christian theology and the laws of nature. In doing so Wiles rejects the possibility that God directly intervenes in the world and therefore rejects the existence of miracles.

Wiles accepts God as the sole creator of the world, yet believes he does not intervene in the world for a number of reasons. He believed we should not see God as playing an 'active role' but instead hold the belief that God created the world as he wanted in its entirety:

the world as a whole [is] a single act of God.

Therefore, God would not undermine the natural laws that he created by intervening in the world. Wiles also argued that an omnibenevolent God would not perform such trivial miracles as those which are normally observed:

even so it would seem strange that no miraculous intervention prevented Auschwitz or Hiroshima, while the purposes apparently forwarded by some of the miracles acclaimed in traditional Christian faith seem trivial by comparison.

Wiles concluded that either God acts arbitrarily (and is therefore not worthy of worship) or that he does not intervene at all.

However, the lack of miracles does not violate a belief in Christianity according to Wiles. Prayer, for instance, still has purpose but should not be understood as causing God to take action. Instead it should be a way of enabling a group or individual to connect with God's will:

[prayer] is the capacity to attain, however incompletely, some awareness of that intention.

Likewise, the miracles of the Bible need not be rejected. Instead, they should be understood to have a symbolic role: to teach about God and faith in Christianity.

== Patristics and modern doctrine ==
An expert in patristics as well as modern doctrine, Wiles was particularly interested in the development of doctrine and questions of orthodoxy and heresy. His book The Making of Christian Doctrine was a critical look at whether early doctrinal affirmations could remain valid when the framework of their intellectual background had shifted. His Working Papers in Doctrine collected together a number of his journal articles on patristic thought. Several of his works focused on the heresiarch Arius and the history of Arianism, including Archetypal Heresy: Arianism through the Centuries. Wiles continued to defend the possibility of a reasonable Christian faith, free from historical and dogmatic commitments which could not be defended on critical grounds but confident in the essential truthfulness and trustworthiness of God, until the end of his life.

Wiles's broad interests in doctrine were reflected in the contributions to his Festschrift, published in 1993. A short critical study of his thought was published in 1987 by the Dutch theologian Gerard Rothuizen (1925–88).

== The Journal of Theological Studies ==
In 1986, Wiles succeeded Henry Chadwick as editor of The Journal of Theological Studies. He edited the journal along with the biblical scholar Morna Hooker. Wiles's editorship concluded with the centenary issue of the journal, published in October 1999, to which he contributed an article charting the journal's origins and history.

== Family ==
His father was Sir Harold Herbert Wiles, Deputy Secretary of the Ministry of Labour and National Service. Maurice Wiles was husband to Patricia Wiles. He was the father of the mathematician Sir Andrew Wiles, who is also a Regius Professor at the University of Oxford, of Mathematics.

== Books by Maurice Wiles ==
- The Spiritual Gospel: The Interpretation of the Fourth Gospel in the Early Church (1960)
- The Christian Fathers (1966)
- The Making of Christian Doctrine: A Study in the Principles of Early Doctrinal Development (1967)
- The Divine Apostle: The Interpretation of St Paul's Epistles in the Early Church (1967)
- Providence (editor) (1969)
- The Remaking of Christian Doctrine (1974)
- Documents in Early Christian Thought (with Mark Santer) (1975)
- Working Papers in Doctrine (1976) (collected papers)
- What is Theology? (1976)
- The Myth of God Incarnate (1977) (contributor)
- Explorations in Theology 4 (1979) (collected papers)
- Faith and the Mystery of God (1982)
- God's Action in the World (1986)
- Christian Theology and Inter-religious Dialogue (1992)
- A Shared Search: Doing Theology in Conversation with One's Friends (1994) (collected papers)
- Archetypal Heresy: Arianism through the Centuries (1996)
- Reason to Believe (1999)
- Studia Patristica: Papers presented at the Thirteenth International Conference on Patristic Studies held in Oxford in 1999 [= Studia Patristica vols. 34–8] (edited, with E. J. Yarnold and P. M. Parvis)
- Scholarship and Faith: a Tale of Two Grandfathers (2003)

== Sources ==
- Peter Vardy (2 August 1999). The Puzzle of God
- Maurice Wiles (1986). God's Action in the World
- "Maurice Wiles: On Miracles" (PDF).
- "Does It Make Sense To Believe in Miracles?".

Academic offices
Preceded by Henry Chadwick	Regius Professor of Divinity at Oxford; 1970—1991	Succeeded by Keith Ward
