= Clare Carlisle =

British philosopher

Clare Carlisle is a British philosopher and biographer. She is the author of books on Baruch Spinoza, Søren Kierkegaard, and George Eliot. She was president of the British Society for the Philosophy of Religion.

== Life ==
Clare Carlisle was born in Manchester in 1977. She studied philosophy at Trinity College, Cambridge between 1995 and 2002. She is a professor at King's College London. In 2024 she gave the Gifford Lectures at the University of St Andrews. Her writing has appeared in the Guardian, The Nation, the Times Literary Supplement, and the Los Angeles Review of Books.

== Works ==
- Carlisle, Clare (2006). Kierkegaard: A Guide for the Perplexed. Bloomsbury.
- Carlisle, Clare (2010). Kierkegaard's Fear and Trembling. Bloomsbury.
- Carlisle, Clare (2014). On Habit. Routledge. ISBN 978-0-415-61914-1.
- Carlisle, Clare (2019). Philosopher of the Heart: The Restless Life of Søren Kierkegaard. Penguin Books, Farrar Straus and Giroux. ISBN 978-0-241-28358-5.
- Carlisle, Clare (2020). Spinoza's Ethics, translated by George Eliot. Princeton University Press.
- Carlisle, Clare (2021). Spinoza's Religion: A New Reading of the Ethics. Princeton University Press. ISBN 978-0-691-17659-8.
- Carlisle, Clare (2023). The Marriage Question: George Eliot's Double Life. Allen Lane, Farrar Straus and Giroux. ISBN 978-0-241-44717-8.
- Carlisle, Clare (2025). Transcendence For Beginners. Fitzcarraldo Editions. ISBN 978-1-80427-195-7.

Professional and academic associations
Preceded by Maria Rosa Antognazza	President of the British Society for the Philosophy of Religion	Succeeded by Christopher Insole
