= Religious Studies (journal) =

- Discipline: Religious studies; philosophy of religion
- Language: English
- Edited by: Yujin Nagasawa

Publication details
- History: 1965–present
- Publisher: Cambridge University Press
- Frequency: Quarterly

Standard abbreviations
- ISO 4: Relig. Stud.

Indexing
- ISSN: 0034-4125 (print); 1469-901X (web)
- JSTOR: 00344125
- OCLC no.: 1763674

Links
- Journal homepage; Online access; Online archive

Religious Studies is a peer-reviewed academic journal published by Cambridge University Press. It addresses problems of the philosophy of religion in the context of a variety of religious traditions. Issues were published approximately biannually from the journal's founding in 1965 until 1969, and have been quarterly since 1970.

== Abstracting and indexing ==
Religious Studies is abstracted and indexed in Arts & Humanities Citation Index, Book Review Index, British Humanities Index, Current Contents/Arts & Humanities, Expanded Academic ASAP, Humanities Abstracts, Humanities International Index, International Bibliography of Periodical Literature, International Bibliography of Book Reviews of Scholarly Literature, MLA International Bibliography, New Testament Abstracts, Philosopher's Index, Rambi (Index of Articles on Jewish Studies), Religion Index One, Guide to Religious Periodicals, and Religious & Theological Abstracts.

== Editors ==
Editor: Yujin Nagasawa, University of Birmingham, UK.

Book Review Editors:

- Tasia Scrutton, University of Leeds, UK
- Simon Hewitt, University of Leeds, UK

Emeritus Editors:

- Peter Byrne
- Robin Le Poidevin
- Stewart Sutherland
- Keith Ward
- Mark Wynn
- David Efird
