= Paul Weindling =

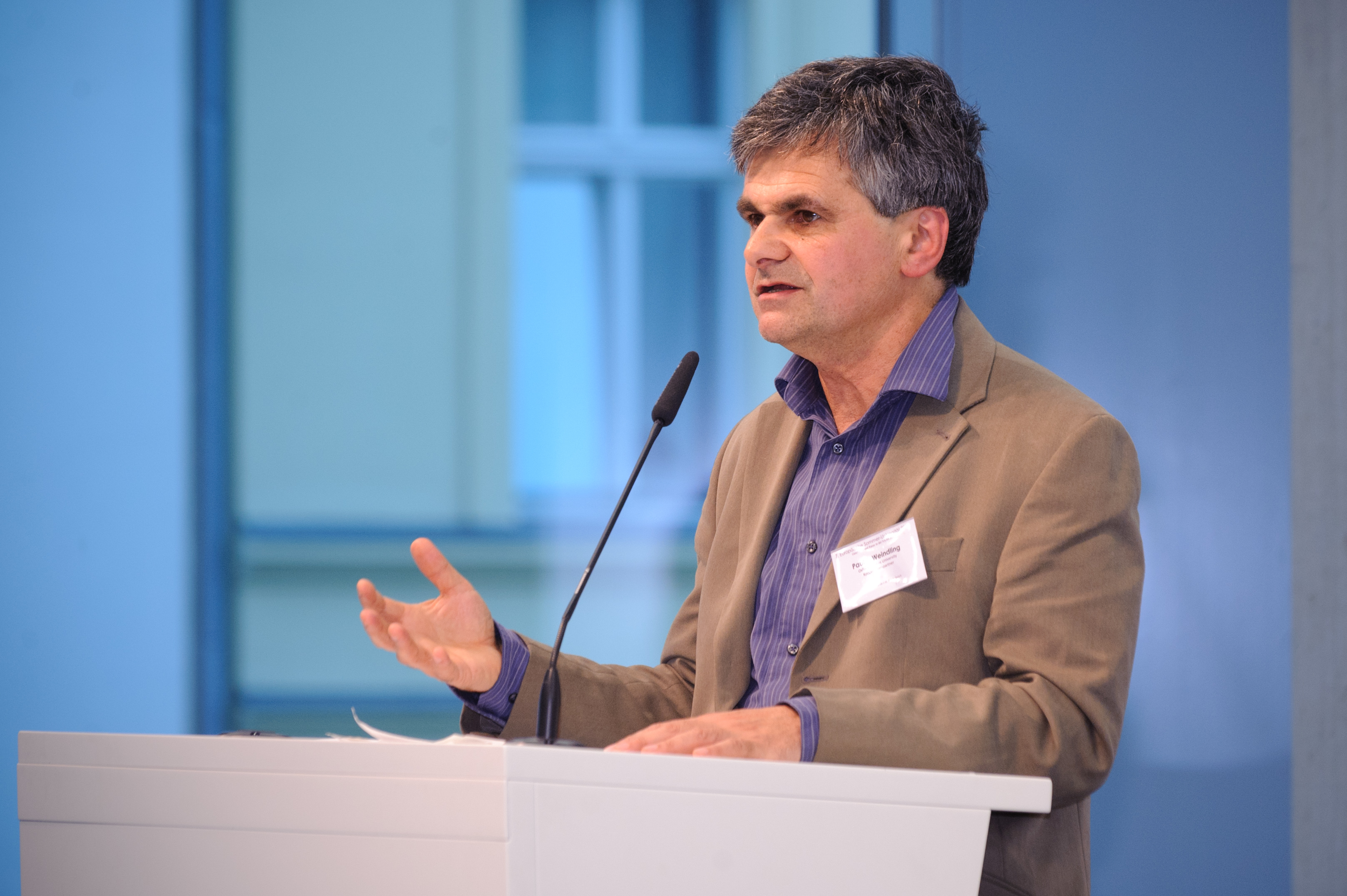
Paul Weindling, 2011

Paul Julian Weindling (born July 1953) is Wellcome Trust research professor in the History of Medicine at Oxford Brookes University. He joined Oxford Brookes University in 1998 as Research Professor in the History of Medicine. From 1978 until 1998 he was at the Wellcome Unit for the History of Medicine at the University of Oxford under the directorship of Charles Webster. Following graduation from the University of Oxford, he completed an MA and PhD at University College London.

His father Emmerich Weindling was one of the forty Austrians allowed to study dental surgery in Britain in 1939, and had requalified at Guy's Hospital. His mother Erica (née Gutmann) had come to Britain age 17 in 1939 on a Kindertransport, staying in Highgate with A.V.Hill. She too became a dentist. They became British citizens in 1949 and made their home in Highgate. Paul Weindling was educated at Highgate School where Hill had been a Governor.

In 2014 he became a member of the German Academy of Sciences Leopoldina.

== Selected publications ==
- Weindling P, Victims and Survivors of Nazi Human Experiments: Science and Suffering in the Holocaust, Bloomsbury Academic (2014) ISBN 9781441195319
- Weindling P, Ed., The Healthcare in Private and Public from the Early Modern Period to 2000, Routledge (2014) ISBN 978-0415727037
- Marks S, Weindling P, Wintour L, In defence of learning: the plight, persecution, and placement of academic refugees, 1933-1980s (Proceedings of the British Academy: 169), Oxford University Press (2011) ISBN 9780197264812
- Weindling P, John W. Thompson, psychiatrist in the shadow of the holocaust, University of Rochester Press (2010) ISBN 9781580462891
