= The Myth of God Incarnate =

1977 book edited by John Hick

First edition

The Myth of God Incarnate is a book edited by John Hick and published by SCM Press in 1977. James Dunn, in a 1980 literature review of academic work on the incarnation, noted the "...well-publicized symposium entitled The Myth of God Incarnate, including contributions on the NT from M. Goulder and F. Young, which provoked several responses." Two years later, in another literature review, R. T. France commented that "theology dropped out of the headlines again, until in 1977 the title, if not the contents, of The Myth of God Incarnate revived public interest". In the 21st century, The Daily Telegraph 2005 obituary for contributor Maurice Wiles (father of Andrew Wiles) described the book as "a highly controversial volume of essays." The controversy prompted a sequel, Incarnation and Myth: the Debate Continued (1979), edited by Michael Goulder, another contributor to the original volume.

In the preface to the book, the contributors start by describing their "clear" perception that Christianity has always been a changing and diverse "movement" quoting T. S. Eliot—"Christianity is always adapting itself into something which can be believed." They also explain that they are "convinced" that growing knowledge of Christian origins leads to accepting that Jesus was ... 'a man approved by God' for a special role within the divine purpose," but that later Christian conceptions of him "as God incarnate, the Second Person of the Holy Trinity" were a "mythological or poetic way of expressing his significance for us." The contributors also mention that: "we have met together for discussion five times during the last three years, and we now offer the results in the hope that they will stimulate a wider discussion both inside and outside the churches."

== Overview ==
The contributors to Hick's collection of essays divided their work into two sections: the first examining "Christian sources"; and the second examining "the development of doctrine." In the preface, however, they note that this division is not absolute, since sources and contemporary issues are related, and discussion of either references the other.

C	Author	Position (at publication)	Title
1	Maurice Wiles	Regius Professor, Christ Church, Oxford	Christianity without Incarnation?
Part I: Testing the Sources
2	Frances Young	Lecturer, Birmingham University	A Cloud of Witnesses
3	Michael Goulder	Tutor, Birmingham University	Jesus, the Man of Universal Destiny
4	Michael Goulder	Tutor, Birmingham University	Two Roots of the Christian Myth
5	Frances Young	Lecturer, Birmingham University	Two Roots or a Tangled Mass
Part II: Testing the Development
6	Leslie Houlden	Principal, Ripon College, Oxford	The Creed of Experience
7	Don Cupitt	Dean, Emmanuel College, Cambridge	The Christ of Christendom
8	Maurice Wiles	Regius Professor, Christ Church, Oxford	Myth in Theology
9	John Hick	Professor, Birmingham University	Jesus and the World Religions
10	Dennis Nineham	Warden, Keble College, Oxford	Epilogue

== Christianity without Incarnation? ==
Maurice Wiles' 10-page introductory chapter to the volume questions whether "the incarnation of God in the particular individual Jesus of Nazareth" is actually essential to Christianity, or whether there can be "a Christianity without (in this sense) incarnation?" He structures his essay in three numbered parts, each of which is a subquestion. Wiles' subquestions explore whether his main question "is (1) a proper, (2) a necessary and (3) a constructive question to ask."

=== A proper question? ===
Regarding his first subquestion, Wiles addresses the "many ears" he expects might find Christianity and incarnation "so nearly synonymous that the suggestion of a possible 'Christianity without incarnation' will sound to them equally paradoxical and unintelligible." He explains that incarnation, in the sense in which he is using the term, is just one "interpretation of the significance of Jesus." Wiles provides three analogies from other Christian thinking to illustrate his meaning: the eucharist, the relationship between the authority and inerrancy of the Bible, and the relationship between incarnation and the virgin birth of Jesus. In each case, abstract doctrines have been so associated with concrete applications, that denials of the concrete applications have historically been seen as denials of the abstract doctrines, hence heresies. However, with the eucharist in particular, Reformation theologians affirmed a meaningful understanding of the eucharist, despite denying the concrete application of transubstantiation—that bread and wine physically become the body and blood of Jesus in the Roman Catholic mass. Wiles concludes that his main question (regarding Christianity without incarnation) is not a contradiction but a proper question, just like the Reformation question regarding a eucharist without transubstantiation.

=== A necessary question? ===
Wiles offers, under three subheadings, three lines of argument in support of his position that "separating 'Christianity' and 'incarnation' is not merely ... admissible ... but ... inescapable." According to Wiles, the question of separation is a necessary question arising from: (a) the origins, (b) the history, and (c) contemporary affirmation of incarnational doctrine. Regarding (a) origins, Wiles contends that, "Incarnation, in its proper sense, is not something directly presented in scripture. It is a construction ..." He acknowledges that New Testament (NT) writers "talk of [Jesus] as God's pre-existent Son come down to earth." However, Wiles' views this as a manner of speech ("one of a number of ways in which Christians thought and spoke of Jesus."). He proposes that it is no longer reasonable, to "the main body even of convinced believers", to speak in such terms as the NT writers, which presume what moderns do not, namely "supernatural divine intervention ... as a natural category of thought and faith."

Wiles offers an additional argument for the necessity of questioning the actuality of the incarnation, by expressing dissatisfaction with the intelligibility of (b) historical formulations of incarnational doctrine: "Are we sure that the concept of an incarnate being, one who is both fully God and fully man, is after all an intelligible concept?" Although he concedes that "negative generalizations are notoriously dangerous claims to make," he ventures that "the church has never succeeded in offering a consistent or convincing picture" of how Jesus could actually be both God and man. In particular he suggests a tendency to err in favour of Jesus as divine, citing the seventh century Monothelite controversy and E. L. Mascall as a distinguished exemplar of the traditional view writing at the time Wiles' essay was published. Wiles concludes his grounds for the necessity of his main question by further appeal to (c) the writing of his own contemporaries. He notes that incarnation, as understood in the work of John Baker, for example, is so far removed from the original NT usage, that "it is not genuinely the same idea that is being expressed." Wiles quotes Baker: "Jesus did not see himself ... as a divine pre-existent being from heaven."

=== A constructive question? ===
To conclude his analysis of the value of questioning the actuality of the incarnation, Wiles anticipates that "some people" might "feel" that were such questioning to "lead to the abandonment of traditional incarnational doctrine, that could only be regarded as an entirely negative and destructive outcome." To help allay such fears, Wiles offers three ideas, historically highly valued in Christian traditions and associated with the incarnation but, he argues, are "not necessarily bound to the incarnation and would not therefore be eliminated from a 'Christianity without incarnation'. The first idea, listed as (a), is "the conviction that the physical world can be the carrier of spiritual value." Wiles notes that this anti-dualist position within Christianity, denying strict separation between the spiritual and the physical, is shared with Judaism, which clearly has no doctrine of Jesus as God incarnate. Wiles clarifies that he is proposing a Christianity that retains a genuine broad sense of incarnation of spirituality, especially in its doctrine of creation, just without applying this too strictly to the person of Jesus of Nazareth.

The second idea, listed as (b), is "the significance of Jesus as a model for human life." Wiles observes that there has been considerable diversity in what people have considered to be lives patterned on Jesus as the standard; and that even the NT does not provide a comprehensive picture of just precisely how Jesus lived his entire life. He quotes R. H. Lightfoot, who famously declared, "the form of the earthly no less than of the heavenly Christ is for the most part hidden from us." Even given these limitations, Wiles reflects that "on any showing to which the name of Christian could conceivably be given [Jesus'] life would remain of substantial importance to us." So, Wiles suggests, Jesus' significance as a role-model "is not directly affected by the way in which his relationship to God is understood."

Before concluding his essay, Wiles considers what he believes to be the most important traditional incarnation-related idea, transformed but retained under his new understanding. Listed as (c), it is the view that in Jesus, "God has acted decisively for the salvation of the world." He anticipates the objection that his transformation would "imply that the worship of Christ, traditional throughout the whole of Christian history, was idolatrous in character." He acknowledges that "It is at this point that the greatest difficulties are likely to be felt. Can they be met?" Although he provides no conclusive answer, Wiles stresses that his new understanding of incarnation could still provide for Jesus to "remain a personal focus of the transforming power of God in the world."

== See also ==
doctrine

- Council of Chalcedon
- Council of Nicaea

theology

- Christology
- God the Son
- Trinity

book

- Robinson, JAT (1963). Honest to God. SCM.

== Bibliography ==
- John Hick, editor (1977). The myth of God incarnate. SCM.
- Michael Goulder (1979). Incarnation and myth: the debate continued. SCM. — Anne Carr, Review, The Journal of Religion 61 (1981): 212–214.
- Green, Michael, ed. (1977). The Truth of God Incarnate. London: Hodder & Stoughton. ISBN 9780340225752. OCLC 925338799. Grand Rapids, Mich.: Eerdmans, 1977 ISBN 9780802817266 OLCC 3292512
- Thomas V. Morris (1986). The Logic of God Incarnate. Description & contents. Wipf & Stock
- John Hick (2006). The metaphor of God incarnate: Christology in a pluralistic age. 2nd revised edition. Westminster John Knox.

reviews

- Bray, Gerald (1978). Review for Themelios.
- Gill, Gerry H. (1977). "Myth and Incarnation". Christian Century December 21, p. 1190.
- McCabe, Herbert (1977). "The Myth of God Incarnate". New Blackfriars 58: 350–357.

other

- Baker, John Austin (1970). The foolishness of God. Longman & Todd.
- Dunn, James DG (1980). Christology in the making: an enquiry into the origins of the doctrine of the incarnation. SCM.
- France, Richard Thomas (1981). "The Worship of Jesus―A Neglected Factor In Christological Debate?" Vox Evangelica 12: 19–33.
- Lightfoot, Robert Henry (1935). History and interpretation of the gospels. Hodder & Stoughton.
