= Stephen Pattison =

British scholar

- Born: 1953 (age 72–73)

Academic background
- Education: University of Edinburgh (PhD)

Academic work
- Discipline: Christian theology
- Sub-discipline: practical theology, ethics, and public service management
- Institutions: University of Birmingham

Stephen Pattison (born 1953) is a British scholar and former H. G. Wood Professor of Theology at the University of Birmingham.

Described by Bob Gillies as "one of the most significant pastoral and practical theologians of the last forty to fifty years", he is best known for his research on practical theology, ethics, and public service management. He attended Bootham School, York and Selwyn College, Cambridge, before going on to train for ministry in the Anglican Church at Edinburgh Theological College and Edinburgh University, where he gained a PhD in Theology.

He delivered a series of Gifford Lectures in 2007 entitled "Seeing Things: From Mantelpieces to Masterpieces", later published as Seeing Things: Deepening Relations with Visual Artefacts by SCM Press.

In 2025 Pattison was honoured with a festschrift: Future Faith: Public and Practical Theologies for the Contemporary World. Edited by Graeme Smith and Andrew Todd, the volume includes 16 essays engaging with Pattison's work, and is noted by Gillies to be an "important book".

== Books ==
- Alive and Kicking: Towards a Practical Theology of Illness and Healing, SCM Press, 1989
- Pastoral Care and Liberation Theology, Cambridge University Press, 1994
- Medical Knowledge: Doubt and Certainty, Open University Press, 1994
- The Faith of the Managers, Cassell, 1997
- The Blackwell Reader in Pastoral and Practical Theology, With James Woodward and John Patton, Darton, Longman and Todd, 2000
- A Critique of Pastoral Care, SCM Press, 2000
- Shame: Theory, Therapy, Theology, Cambridge University Press, 2000
- Using the Bible in Christian Ministry, With Margaret Cooling and Trevor Cooling, Darton, Longman and Todd, 2007
- The Challenge of Practical Theology: Selected Essays, Jessica Kingsley, 2007
- Seeing Things: Deepening Relations with Visual Artefacts, SCM Press, 2007
- The SCM Study Guide to Theological Reflection, With Judith Thompson and Ross Thompson, SCM Press, 2008
- Emerging Values in Health Care, Ed. with Ben Hannigan, Roisin Pill and Huw Thomas, Jessica Kingsley, 2010
- Understanding Muslim Chaplaincy, With Sophie Gilliat-Ray and Mansur Ali, Ashgate, 2013
- Saving Face: Enfacement, Shame, Theology, Ashgate, 2013
- Invitation to Research in Practical Theology, With Zoë Bennett, Elaine Graham and Heather Walton, Routledge, 2018
