= Charles Webster (historian of medicine) =

Medical historian and academic

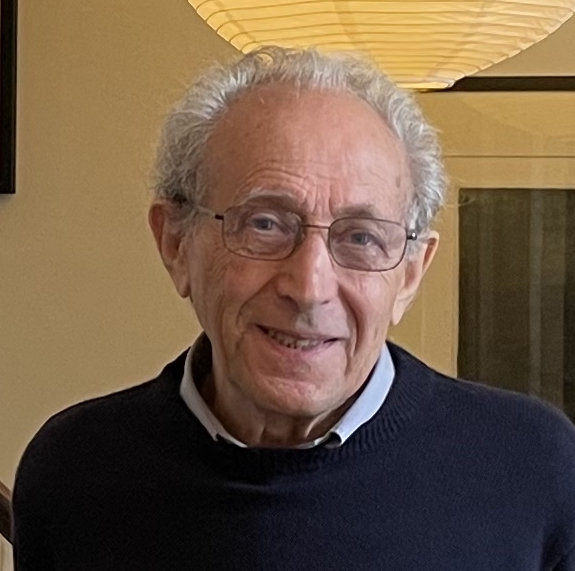
Webster in 2021

Charles Webster is a historian and retired academic specialising in the history of medicine and science. He was Reader in the History of Medicine and Director of the Wellcome Unit for the History of Medicine at the University of Oxford from 1972 to 1988 (when he was also a fellow of Corpus Christi College, Oxford), and a senior research fellow at All Souls College, Oxford, from 1988 to 2004. Webster was elected a Fellow of the British Academy in 1982.

== Career ==
Webster's parents were eastern European political refugees and he spent most of his adolescence in Nottingham. His first job, at the age of 16, was as a laboratory technician for Boots. He studied at night school for his A levels and went on to earn a degree in botany and microbiology from University College London. Webster then moved to Sheffield to train as a teacher, working from 1959 to 1965 as a science teacher at the City Grammar School. He began private historical study while teaching and published his first research paper in Nature in 1962.

Webster's first academic appointment was in the philosophy department of the University of Leeds. In 1968 he was elected a research fellow of Corpus Christi College, Oxford, taking up the appointment in 1969. He was appointed a university reader in the history of medicine, also attached to Corpus Christi, in 1972. He remained in this post until 1988 when he was elected a senior research fellow of All Souls College, Oxford, where he remained until his retirement in 2004. Charles Webster was known for fostering talent in history, medicine, and science, guiding numerous Oxford students, among them Mark Greengrass, Anne Marie Rafferty, Margaret Pelling, Robert Crocker, and Howard Hotson. Webster also directed the Wellcome Unit for the History of Medicine from its foundation in 1972, building it into one of the leading British centres for research and teaching in the history of medicine. At the start, the two Medical Faculties were represented by John Potter, a neurologist, and Charles Michel, a physiologist, the Modern History Faculty was represented by Hugh Trevor-Roper and Margaret Gowing. Among the distinguished historians who have been members of the Unit, Margaret Pelling, working mainly on medicine in early modern England, and Paul Weindling, a specialist in the history of medicine and the life sciences in continental Europe, most notably in Germany, have played especially important roles. Webster has continued work on the Hartlib Papers on which he published first in 1975 the 'Great Instauration' which earned him an FBA in 1982 (though he resigned from it soon afterwards), followed by the 'Portrait on Samuel Hartlib' which takes advantage of the 2013 digitization of the papers. From the endorsements to the book: There is no scholar alive who has such command of this most complex and rewarding archive. Webster combines the deepest engagement with brisk and informative judgement, exactly the guide we need both to Hartlib and to his astonishing network. But above all this book is surcharged by Webster’s passion for the people he has spent much of his scholarly life reinvestigating: it is the final vindication of them all.

== Publications ==
- Samuel Hartlib and the Advancement of Learning (Cambridge: Cambridge University Press, 1970).
- The Great Instauration. Science, Medicine and Reform, 1626–1660 (London: Duckworth, 1975), 2nd edn. (Oxford: Peter Lang, 2002).
- From Paracelsus to Newton: Magic and the Making of Modern Science (Cambridge: Cambridge University Press, 1982).
- Problems of Health Care: The National Health Service before 1957 (London: Her Majesty's Stationery Office, 1988).
- The National Health Service: A Political History (Oxford: Oxford University Press, 1989), 2nd edn. (Oxford: Oxford University Press, 2002).
- Government and Health Care: The British National Health Service 1958–1979 (London: Her Majesty's Stationery Office, 1996).
- Paracelsus: Medicine, Magic and Mission at the End of Time (New Haven: Yale University Press, 2008).
- In Times of Strife (Oxford: Taylor Institution, 2023). Open Access. From the cover: The book explores the pursuit of humanitarian objectives in the face of perilous conditions of war, exile and extreme social dislocation from 1600 to 1945. Each section reconstructs the endeavours of a pair of associated intellectuals or artists within a multi-cultural European setting. The first two chapters cover the fate of 17th century intellectuals Samuel Hartlib, Jan Amos Comenius (Komenský), John Hall and William Rand. The last two chapters discuss the artists Ernst Barlach and Jakob Steinhardt and the brothers Salo and Robert Pratzer. All relate to multi-cultural situations and they possess a European, and especially Eastern European, dimension. Although addressing disparate situations, there are many points of interconnection between the sections, and also relevance to current disasters as for instance the crisis in Ukraine. The Pratzer family were driven into exile from the Lviv region of Ukraine, while the Ukraine journey of Ernst Barlach traversed the current line of demarcation and culminated with a visit to Bakhmut, Kramatorsk and Kostyantynivka. This unusual and challenging undertaking exploits many fresh archival and related resources in pursuit of its goals of reassessment, correction and addition to knowledge on all the fronts of its coverage. The book is richly illustrated with original artwork by Ernst Barlach, Käthe Kollwitz, Jakob Steinhardt, and earlier artists whose work reflects an engagement with the theme of displacement. The title image 'Deportation' is based on a sketch by Charlotte (Lotka) Burešová (1904-1983) who in 1942 was deported to Theresienstadt, worked in the Sonderwerkstätte there and escaped three days before the liberation. The book is part of the 'Cultural Memory' publications of the Treasures of the Taylorian Cultural Memory series, vol. 5, and linked with an exhibition of books and art works.
- A Portrait of Samuel Hartlib: In Search of Universal Betterment. Open Book Publishers 2025. doi:10.11647/OBP.0486. ISBN 978-1-80511-691-2. Open Access.
