= Fiona Macpherson =

Professor of Philosophy

Fiona Macpherson FRSE MAE
- Born: 19 October 1971 (age 54)

Academic background
- Education: University of Glasgow; University of St Andrews; University of Stirling; Harvard University

Academic work
- Discipline: Philosophy
- Institutions: Girton College, Cambridge; University of Glasgow; Australian National University

Fiona Macpherson FRSE MAE (born 19 October 1971) is Professor of Philosophy at the University of Glasgow, where she is also Director of the Centre for the Study of Perceptual Experience. She was elected a Fellow of the Royal Society of Edinburgh in 2017 and a member of Academia Europaea in 2018.

== Biography ==
She studied at the University of Glasgow, the University of St Andrews and the University of Stirling. She has been a Kennedy Scholar at Harvard University and a Rosamund Chambers Research Fellow at Girton College, Cambridge, and a Research Fellow at the Centre for Consciousness at the Australian National University. Macpherson has held visiting positions at the Institut Jean Nicod, Paris, Umeå University and the Institute of Philosophy, University of London. She is a member of the governing council of the Arts and Humanities Research Council (AHRC). She is a trustee of the Kennedy Memorial Trust, having been appointed by the British prime minister for a five-year term from 1 October 2014 and reappointed for five years in 2019. She was appointed to the AHRC Creative Industries Advisory Group in 2019. Macpherson was president of the Scots Philosophical Association from December 2015 to December 2016. She is currently president of the British Philosophical Association.

== Research ==
Macpherson's research interests include the nature of consciousness, perception, introspection, imagination and the metaphysics of mind. Amongst her publications, she is the co-editor of Disjunctivism: Perception, Action, Knowledge, published by Oxford University Press in 2008, The Admissible Contents of Experience, published by Wiley-Blackwell in 2011, editor of The Senses: Classic and Contemporary Philosophical Perspectives, published by Oxford University Press in 2011, co-editor of Hallucination: Philosophy and Psychology, published by MIT Press in 2013, and co-editor of Phenomenal Presence and Perceptual Imagination and Perceptual Memory and editor of Sensory Substitution and Augmentation, all published by Oxford University Press in 2018. She is co-editor of The Routledge Handbook of Philosophy of Colour, published by Routledge in 2021. She has appeared on numerous radio programmes, including on BBC Radio 4 discussing human senses and perception and on All In The Mind discussing her collaborative project Dreamachine She is a regular guest on the podcast Philosophy Takes On The News.

== Notable remarks ==
In relation to debates about the issue of all-male panels at academic conferences, Macpherson has warned against tokenism, noting that she had herself organised an all-male panel, when the prominent women she invited were unavailable. She stated that "I think that it is even all right to only invite men as speakers to some events, if that is appropriate because of research that you want to hear about and the theme of the conference".

Professional and academic associations
Preceded by Robert Stern	President of the British Philosophical Association; 2019–present	Incumbent
