= Howard Hotson =

Historian and academic

- Occupations: Historian and academic
- Title: Professor of Intellectual History
- Spouse: Maria Rosa Antognazza
- Children: 3

Academic background
- Education: Trinity College, Toronto; Corpus Christi College, Oxford
- Thesis: Johann Heinrich Alsted: Encyclopedism, Millenarianism and the Second Reformation in Germany (1991)
- Doctoral advisor: Charles Webster

Academic work
- Discipline: History
- Sub-discipline: Intellectual history; Germany in the early modern period; Digital humanities
- Institutions: University of Mainz; Brasenose College, Oxford; University of California, Los Angeles; University of Göttingen; University of Aberdeen; St Anne's College, Oxford

Howard Baier Hotson is Professor of Early Modern Intellectual History at the University of Oxford, and a Fellow of St Anne's College, Oxford.

== Life and career ==
Born in the United States and raised in Canada, Hotson was educated at Trinity College, University of Toronto, and Corpus Christi College, Oxford. He has held research fellowships from the Social Sciences and Humanities Research Council of Canada, the Institut für Europäische Geschichte (Mainz), Brasenose College (Oxford), the Herzog August Bibliothek (Wolfenbüttel), the Center for Seventeenth and Eighteenth-Century Studies (UCLA), the Max-Planck-Institut für Geschichte (Göttingen), and the British Academy (London). Hotson lectured at the University of Aberdeen prior to being elected a Tutorial Fellow in History at St Anne's College, Oxford in 2005. In October 2008 he was awarded the Title of Distinction of Professor of Intellectual History by the University of Oxford. Between 2009 and 2014, he was President of the International Society for Intellectual History.

Since 2009, he has helped to pioneer the application of digital tools and methods to intellectual history by directing a series of collaborative research projects funded by the Andrew W. Mellon Foundation (New York, New York), Horizon 2020 (EU), the Arts and Humanities Research Council (UK), and the Packard Humanities Institute (Los Altos, California). These include Early Modern Letters Online (a collaboratively populated a digital union catalogue of early modern learned correspondence), Reassembling the Republic of Letters, 1500–1800 (which negotiated a "digital framework for multi-lateral collaboration on Europe's intellectual history"), and Cabinet: Digital Transformation of Teaching through Objects (an Oxford-based platform for teaching with objects, images and digital multimedia).

In 2011, he emerged as a prominent critic of the marketization of UK higher education in an article in the London Review of Books. He subsequently wrote extensively on the subject in the Times Higher Education and elsewhere, co-founding with Sir Keith Thomas the Council for the Defence of British Universities, of which he was a trustee for many years.

He was married to the Italian-British philosopher Maria Rosa Antognazza until her death in March 2023. The couple had three children.

== Selected publications ==
- The Reformation of Common Learning: Post-Ramist Method and the Reception of the New Philosophy, 1618–1670 [Oxford-Warburg Studies] (Oxford University Press, 2020)
- A Commonwealth of Letters: From the Index of Literary Correspondence to Early Modern Letters Online, edited with Miranda Lewis [= Bodleian Library Record, 33.1-2] (Oxford, 2020)
- Reassembling the Republic of Letters in the Digital Age: Standards, Systems, Scholarship, ed. with Thomas Wallnig (Göttingen University Press, 2019): Reassembling the Republic of Letters in the Digital Age.
- Commonplace Learning: Ramism and its German Ramifications, 1543–1630 [Oxford-Warburg Studies] (Oxford University Press, 2007)
- Johann Heinrich Alsted 1588–1638: Between Renaissance, Reformation and Universal Reform (Oxford: Clarendon Press, 2000)
- Paradise Postponed: Johann Heinrich Alsted and the Birth of Calvinist Millenarianism (Dordroecht: Kluwer, 2000)
