= West Derby School =

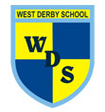

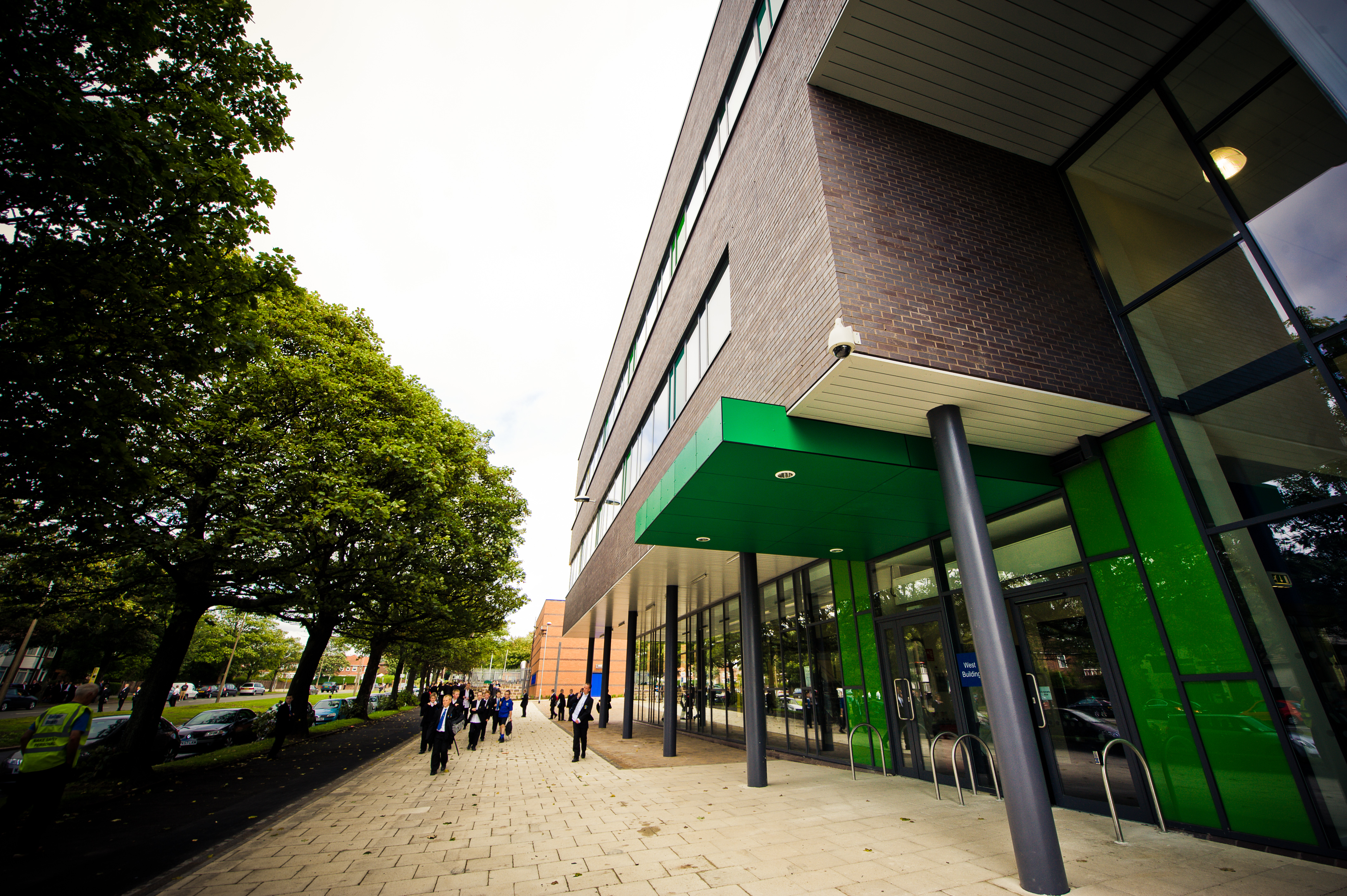
- West Derby School entrance

Location
- West Derby Road; Liverpool, Merseyside, L13 7HQ; United Kingdom; 53.425790°N 2.922046°W

Information
- Type: Academy
- Motto: We Deliver Success
- Established: September 1957
- Department for Education URN: 138696 Tables
- Ofsted: Reports
- Head teacher: Sian Graham
- Gender: Male
- Age: 11 to 18
- Enrolment: 1129
- Colours: Red, yellow, black, blue
- Website: www.westderbyschool.co.uk

West Derby School is a comprehensive all-boys (11–18) academy based in Liverpool, England. The school was converted from a Local education authority school to academy status on 1 September 2012.

The current school building, located on West Derby Road, Liverpool, opened in September 2010, a single-sited school built under the Building Schools for the Future programme, having previously been based on two sites on Quarry and Bankfield roads.

West Derby School is twinned with Gyanodaya Secondary School in Palpa, Nepal. After the April 2015 Nepal earthquake the school raised over £2000 to help with essential rebuilding work.

== School history ==
The post-war 'baby-boom' resulted in a much higher number of teenage children in the 1950s. Liverpool Corporation embarked on a massive school building programme, of which the original two school sites were part.

West Derby High School was originally opened in September 1957 by the first Head Teacher was Mr A.L Casson. The school was designed by Liverpool Architects "Harold E Davies and Sons" to house 540 boys. Harold E Davies died in 1952 so it is unlikely that he was involved with the plans. His son Harold Hinchcliffe most likely designed the building which took about two years to complete.

Bankfield Modern School was opened in September by Harry Elson 1959. It was designed by Rimmer Sisters Limited to house 400 boys.

Originally West Derby was designed to be used in collaboration with nearby Holly Lodge girls school, and in 1984 there were unsuccessful plans to merge the two schools into one.

== Notable alumni ==
Notable alumni include:

- Peter Byrne, a philosopher
- Craig Charles, an actor
- Tom Davies, a football player, Everton FC
