= Robert Arrington =

American philosopher

- Born: October 19, 1938; Bainbridge, Georgia
- Died: June 20, 2015
- Education: Vanderbilt University (BA), Tulane University (MA, PhD)
- Occupation: Philosopher

Robert L. Arrington (October 19, 1938 – June 20, 2015) was an American philosopher, specialising in moral philosophy, the philosophy of Ludwig Wittgenstein, and the philosophy of psychology.

Arrington was born in Bainbridge, Georgia, and educated at Vanderbilt University (B.A. 1960, cum laude) and Tulane University (M.A. 1962 and Ph.D. 1966).

After three years as assistant professor at The University of Southern Mississippi (1963–1966), Arrington moved to Georgia State University, where he is professor emeritus of philosophy, and director of Wittgenstein Studies. He has held a Woodrow Wilson Fellowship (1960) and N.D.E.A. Title IV Fellowship (1960), and received a Griffin Award from the Southern Society for Philosophy and Psychology in 1968. He was an American Council of Learned Societies Research Fellow at the University of Oxford (1974–1975).

== Books ==
=== Monographs ===
- Rationalism, Realism, and Relativism: Perspectives in Contemporary Moral Epistemology (Ithaca: Cornell University Press, 1989)
- Western Ethics (Oxford: Blackwell, 1997)
- Twentieth Century Ethics (Oxford: Blackwell, forthcoming)

=== As editor ===
- Wittgenstein's "Philosophical Investigations": Text and Context [co-ed. H.J. Glock] (London: Routledge, 1991)
- Wittgenstein and Quine [co-ed. H.J. Glock] (London: Routledge, 1996)
- A Companion to the Philosophers (Oxford: Blackwell, 1998)
- Wittgenstein and Philosophy of Religion [co-ed. Mark Addis] (London: Routledge, forthcoming)

== See also ==
- American philosophy
- List of American philosophers
