= Peter Byrne (philosopher) =

English academic

Peter Byrne (born 1950) is an emeritus professor in Philosophy at King's College London .

== Life ==
Born in Wallasey, England, on 18 July 1950 and raised in Norris Green, Liverpool. He was educated at West Derby School, an all boys' Comprehensive. He studied Philosophy at the University of York, graduating with a first class degree in 1971, followed by a BPhil in Philosophy at Linacre College, Oxford. He was a lecturer, then later professor, of Philosophy and Ethics at Kings College from 1976 to 2009. In addition he was head of the department of Theology and Religious Studies at Kings from 2000 to 2002 and president of The British Society for the Philosophy of Religion from 2003 to 2005. He was also for several years editor of the journal Religious Studies.

== Bibliography ==
He is the author of several books, including:

- Natural Religion and the Nature of Religion - the Legacy of Deism, 1989, Routledge, London
- The Philosophical and Theological Foundations of Ethics, 1992, Macmillan, Basingstoke and London. [1999 second, expanded edition]
- Religion Defined and Explained, 1993, Macmillan, Basingstoke and London, - with Peter B. Clarke
- Prolegomena to Religious Pluralism: Reference and Realism in Religion 1995, Macmillan, Basingstoke and London
- The Moral Interpretation of Religion, 1998, Edinburgh University Press, Edinburgh / Eerdmans, Grand Rapids, Michigan
- Philosophical and Ethical Problems in Mental Handicap, 2000, Macmillan, Basingstoke and London
- God and Realism, 2003, Ashgate Publishing, Aldershot
- Kant on God, 2007, Ashgate Publishing, Aldershot
