= Malek Shojaee =

Iranian philosopher

Malek Shojaee Joshoghani (Persian: مالک شجاعی جشوقانی)
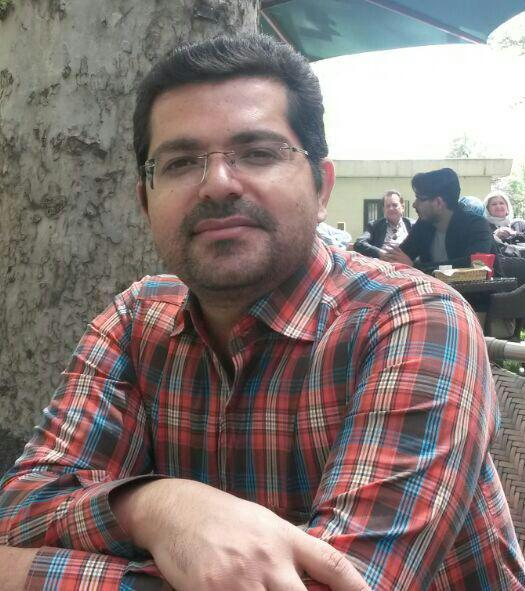
- Born: 1982 (age 43–44)
- Awards: Iranian Book Review Award

Education
- Education: University of Tehran

Philosophical work
- Era: 21st century Philosophy
- Region: Western philosophy
- School: Continental
- Institutions: Institute for Humanities and Cultural Studies
- Main interests: post-Kantian philosophy

Malek Shojaee Joshoghani (born 1982) (Persian: مالک شجاعی جشوقانی) is an Iranian philosopher and assistant professor of philosophy at Institute for Humanities and Cultural Studies. He is known for his expertise on contemporary European philosophy. Shojaee is the editor-in-chief of Philosophy & Theology & Mysticism Quarterly Book Review.

== Books ==
- A Philosophical-Historical Introduction to Enlightenment, Tehran: Elm, 2012
