= Paul Giladi =

British philosophy professor

- Born: October 1986 (age 39–40); London, UK
- Awards: National Teaching Fellowship

Academic background
- Education: King's College London (BA, MPhil.Stud); University of Sheffield (PhD)
- Thesis: Hegel's Critique and Development of Kant: The Passion of Reason (2013)
- Doctoral advisor: Robert Stern, Christopher Hookway

Academic work
- Era: Contemporary philosophy
- Region: Western philosophy
- School or tradition: German Idealism, Critical Theory, Postanalytic philosophy, Pragmatism, Decoloniality
- Institutions: SOAS University of London
- Website: soas.ac.uk/about/paul-giladi-1

Paul Giladi (born October, 1986) is a Reader in Philosophy at SOAS University of London.

== Life and works ==
Giladi earned his undergraduate degree and his research master's degree in philosophy both from King’s College London. In June 2013, he earned his PhD in philosophy from the University of Sheffield, writing a thesis, Hegel's Critique and Development of Kant: The Passion of Reason, under the direction of Robert Stern and Christopher Hookway.

Giladi's first permanent academic position was at Manchester Metropolitan University, where he was appointed Lecturer in Philosophy in 2018. He was then promoted to Senior Lecturer in Philosophy in 2019. Giladi joined SOAS University of London as a Lecturer in Philosophy in September 2023. He was promoted to Senior Lecturer in Philosophy in 2024, and then to Reader in Philosophy in 2025.

To date, Giladi has published extensively on German Idealism (particularly Hegel), philosophical naturalism, American Pragmatism, critical social theories, and critical social epistemologies. He is one of the co-creators of the world’s first Decolonising Philosophy Curriculum Toolkit and Handbook.

In 2026, Giladi was awarded a National Teaching Fellowship.

=== Selected publications ===
==== Edited books ====
- Giladi, Paul; McMillan, Nicola (2022-06-16). Epistemic Injustice and the Philosophy of Recognition. New York: Routledge. doi:10.4324/9780429435133. ISBN 978-0-429-43513-3.
- Giladi, Paul, ed. (2020-12-22). Hegel and the Frankfurt School. New York : Routledge, 2021.: Routledge. doi:10.4324/9781315105857. ISBN 978-1-315-10585-7.
- Giladi, Paul, ed. (2019-07-25). Responses to Naturalism: Critical Perspectives From Idealism and Pragmatism. Routledge. doi:10.4324/9781315180854. ISBN 978-1-315-18085-4.
