= Philosophy & Theology & Mysticism Quarterly Book Review =

- Editor: Malek Shojaee
- Categories: philosophy
- Frequency: Quarterly
- Founded: 1997; 28 years ago
- Country: Iran
- Based in: Tehran
- Language: Persian
- Website: ptmbr.faslnameh.org
- ISSN: 2423-5024

Philosophy & Theology & Mysticism Quarterly Book Review (PTMBR) (Persian: فصلنامه نقد کتاب کلام، فلسفه و عرفان), formerly Ketab-é Mah-é Falsafeh, is a Persian-language journal, specializing in the review of books about philosophy, theology and mysticism. It is published four times a year and covers all areas of and approaches to philosophy. Begun as a publication of Iran Book House in 1997 by its first editor and publisher, Ali Asghar Mohammadkhani, the journal changed its name to PTMBR in 2014. In 2014 editorship of PTMBR passed to Malek Shojaee of the Institute for Humanities and Cultural Studies. The journal is published in Tehran.
