= Eschatological verification =

Process whereby a proposition can be verified after death

Eschatological verification describes a process whereby a proposition can be verified after death. A proposition such as "there is an afterlife" is verifiable if true but not falsifiable if false (if it's false, the individual will not know it's false, because they have no state of being). The term is most commonly used in relation to God and the afterlife, although there may be other propositions - such as moral propositions - which may also be verified after death.

John Hick has expressed the premise as an allegory of a quest to a Celestial City. In this parable, a theist and an atheist are both walking down the same road. The theist believes there is a destination, the atheist believes there is not. If they reach the destination, the theist will have been proven right; but if there is no destination on an endless road, this can never be verified. This is an attempt to explain how a theist expects some form of life or existence after death and an atheist does not. They both have separate belief systems and live life accordingly, but logically one is right and the other is not. If the theist is right, he will be proven so when he arrives in the afterlife. But if the atheist is right, they will simply both be dead and nothing will be verified.

This acts as a response to Verificationism. Under Hick's analogy claims about the afterlife are verifiable in principle because the truth becomes clear after death. To some extent it is therefore wrong to claim that religious language cannot be verified because it can (when you're dead).

== Sources ==
- Alston, William P. "Functionalism and Theological Language." In Divine Nature and Human Language: Essays in Philosophical Theology. Ithaca: Cornell University Press, 1989a. 33–34.
- Hick, John H. Faith and Knowledge. 2nd ed. London, UK: Macmillan, 1988. 177–178.
- Hick, John H. Philosophy or Religion. 4th ed. London, UK: Prentice Hall, 1990. 82–89, also see 135–136.
- "The Internet Encyclopedia of Philosophy". 2006. University of Tennessee, Martin. 21 June 2008 https://www.iep.utm.edu.
