= Yujin Nagasawa =

Japanese philosopher (born 1975)

- Born: 23 June 1975 (age 51)

Yujin Nagasawa (Japanese: ユウジン・ナガサワ, born 23 June 1975) is a Japanese-born philosopher specialising in the philosophy of religion, the philosophy of mind and applied philosophy.

Nagasawa is Kingfisher College Chair of the Philosophy of Religion and Ethics at the University of Oklahoma. He is also former president of the British Society for the Philosophy of Religion, and co-director of the John Hick Centre for Philosophy of Religion. He is best known for his work on the nature and existence of God and the problem of consciousness.

== Early life and education ==
Nagasawa was born in Tokyo, Japan. He studied philosophy and applied mathematics at Stony Brook University in the United States and received his PhD from the Australian National University (ANU) in 2004.

== Career ==
From 2004 to 2005 he was Izaak Walton Killam Memorial Postdoctoral Fellow in the Department of Philosophy at the University of Alberta, Canada and Research Fellow at the Centre for Applied Philosophy and Public Ethics at ANU. He taught at the University of Birmingham, where he held the H. G. Wood Professorship of the Philosophy of Religion and served as the Co-Director of the Birmingham Centre for Philosophy of Religion, from 2006 to 2023. He was awarded the Philosophical Quarterly Essay Prize in 2007, the John Templeton Award for Theological Promise by the John Templeton Foundation and the University of Heidelberg in 2008, and the Excellence in Philosophy of Religion Prize by the University of St. Thomas in 2010.

In 2018 he was appointed as the editor of Religious Studies published by Cambridge University Press. He is also currently Philosophy of Religion Editor of the Cambridge Elements series and Philosophy Compass, and a member of the editorial board of the International Journal for Philosophy of Religion, the European Journal for Philosophy of Religion and Ashgate's the British Society for the Philosophy of Religion Book Series.

== Research ==
Nagasawa's research interests include philosophy of religion (the existence of God, divine attributes, the problem of evil, science and religion), philosophy of mind (phenomenal consciousness, the mind-body problem, panpsychism, semantic externalism) and applied philosophy (medical ethics, the meaning of life, death and immortality).

== Publications ==
Books (Monographs)

- (2024) The Problem of Evil for Atheists, Oxford University Press, 2024, ISBN 9780198901884.
- (2017) Miracles: A Very Short Introduction, Oxford University Press, 2017.
- (2017) Maximal God: A New Defence of Perfect Being Theism, Oxford University Press, 2017.
- (2011) The Existence of God: A Philosophical Introduction, Routledge, 2011.
- (2008) God and Phenomenal Consciousness: A Novel Approach to Knowledge Arguments, Cambridge University Press, 2008. Winner of the 2008 John Templeton Award for Theological Promise.

Books (Edited Collections)

- (2017) Palgrave Handbooks of the Afterlife (Edited with Benjamin Matheson), Palgrave Macmillan, 2017.
- (2015) Alternative Concepts of God: Essays on the Metaphysics of the Divine (Edited with Andrei Buckareff), Oxford University Press, 2015.
- (2015) Consciousness in the Physical World: Perspectives on Russelliam Monism (Edited with Torin Alter), Oxford University Press, 2015.
- (2012) Special Issue on Nonphysicalist Monism, Journal of Consciousness Studies (Edited with Max Velmans), 2012 19, No. 9-10.
- (2012) Scientific Approaches to the Philosophy of Religion, Palgrave Macmillan, 2012.
- (2011) Special Issue on Anselmian theism, International Journal for Philosoph of Religion 69, Issue 2, 2011.
- (2008) New Waves in Philosophy of Religion (Edited with Erik Wielenberg), Palgrave Macmillan (New Waves in Philosophy Series), 2008.
- (2004) There's Something About Mary: Essays on Phenomenal Consciousness and Frank Jackson's Knowledge Argument (Edited with Peter Ludlow and Daniel Stoljar), MIT Press, 2004.

Papers

- (2019) ‘Panpsychism versus Pantheism, Polytheism, and Cosmopsychism’, in William Seager (ed.), The Routledge Handbook of Panpsychism, Routledge, pp. 259-268.
- (2018) ‘The Problem of Evil for Atheists’, in Nick Trakakis (ed.), The Problem of Evil: Eight Views in Dialogue, Oxford University Press, pp. 151-175.
- (2017) ‘Global Philosophy of Religion and its Challenges’, in Paul Draper and J. L. Schellenberg (eds.), Renewing Philosophy of Religion: Exploratory Essays, Oxford University Press, pp. 33-47.
- (2017) ‘Where does Consciousness Come From?’, BBC Focus magazine, August, pp. 64–69, 2017.
- (2017) ‘Panpsychism and Priority Cosmopsychism’ (with Khai Wager) in Godehard Gruentrup and Ludwig Jaskolla (eds.), Panpsychism: Contemporary Perspectives, Oxford University Press, pp. 113-129, 2017.
- (2016) ‘Modal Panentheism’, Andrei Buckareff and Yujin Nagasawa (eds.), Alternative Concepts of God: Essays on the Metaphysics of the Divine, Oxford University Press, pp. 91–105, 2016.
- (2016) ‘Silence, Evil, and Shusaku Endo’, in Adam Green and Eleonore Stump (eds.), Hidden Divinity and Religious Belief: New Perspectives, Cambridge University Press, pp. 246-259, 2016.
- (2015) ‘Multiverse Pantheism’, Klaas Kraay (ed.), God and the Multiverse: Scientific, Philosophical, and Theological Perspectives, Routledge, pp. 177–191, 2015.
- (2014) ‘The Paradox of Eden and Black-and-White Mary’, in Andrew Moore (ed.), God, Mind and Knowledge, Ashgate, pp. 135-143, 2014.
- (2013) ‘Maximal God and the Problem of Evil’, Jeanine Diller and Asa Kasher (eds.), Models of God and Other Ultimate Realities, Springer, pp. 233–243, 2013.
- (2013) ‘Models of Anselmian Theism’, Faith and Philosophy 30, pp. 3-25, 2013.
- (2012) ‘Introduction to Nonphysicalist Monism’ (with Max Velmans), Journal of Consciousness Studies 19, pp. 7–18, 2012.
- (2012) ‘What is Russellian Monism?’ (with Torin Alter), Journal of Consciousness Studies 19, pp. 67-95, 2012. Reprinted in Torin Alter and Yujin Nagasawa (eds.), Consciousness in the Physical World: Perspectives on Russellian Monism, Oxford University Press.
- (2012) ‘Infinite Decomposability and the Mind-Body Problem’, American Philosophical Quarterly 49, pp. 357–367, 2012.
- (2012) ‘Is There a Shallow Logical Refutation of the Ontological Argument?’, a special issue on the ontological argument, European Journal for Philosophy of Religion 4, pp. 87-99, 2012.
- (2012) ‘John Hick’s Pan(en)theistic Monism’, Religious Pluralism and the Modern World: An Ongoing Engagement with John Hick, Sharada Sugirtharajah (ed.), Palgrave Macmillan, pp. 176–189, 2012.
- (2011) ‘Anselmian Theism’, Philosophy Compass 6, pp. 564-571, 2011.
- (2010) ‘The Knowledge Argument and Epiphenomenalism’, Erkenntnis 72, pp. 37–56, 2010.
- (2010) ‘The Ontological Argument and the Devil’, Philosophical Quarterly 60, pp. 72-91. Winner of the 2010 Excellence in Philosophy of Religion Prize, 2010.
- (2010) ‘Australasian Dualism’, Graham Oppy, Nick Trakakis, et al. (eds.), A Companion to Australasian Philosophy, Monash University Publishing, 2010.
- (2009) ‘Immortality without Boredom’ (with Lisa Bortolotti), Ratio 22, pp. 261-277, 2009.
- (2009) ‘The Knowledge Argument’, Tim Bayne, Axel Cleeremans and Patrick Wilken (eds.), The Oxford Companion to Consciousness, Oxford University Press, pp. 395–397, 2009.
- (2009) ‘Foreword’ to John Hick and Arthur McGill (eds.), The Many-Faced Argument: Recent Studies on the Ontological Argument for the Existence of God (new reprint), Eugene, Oregon, Wipf and Stock, 2009.
- (2008) ‘A New Defence of Anselmian Theism’, Philosophical Quarterly 58, pp. 577–596. Winner of the 2007 Philosophical Quarterly Essay Prize, 2008.
- (2007) ‘Millican on the Ontological Argument’, Mind 116, pp. 1027-1040, 2007.
- (2007) ‘A Further Reply to Beyer on Omniscience’, Sophia 46, pp. 65–67, 2007.
- (2007) ‘The Grounds of Worship Again: A Reply to Crowe’ (with Tim Bayne), Religious Studies 43, pp. 475-40, 2007.
- (2007) ‘Formulating the Explanatory Gap’, The American Philosophical Association Newsletter on Philosophy and Computers, 2007.
- (2007) ‘Proxy Consent and Counterfactuals’, Bioethics 22, pp. 16-24, 2007.
- (2007) ‘Surgeon Report Cards and the Concept of Defensive Medicine’, Steve Clarke and Justin Oakley (eds.), Informed Consent and Clinical Accountability: The Ethics of Auditing and Reporting Surgeon Performance, Cambridge University Press, pp. 255–265, 2007.
- (2006) ‘A Place for Protoconsciousness?’, Psyche, Symposium on Gregg Rosenberg’s A Place for Consciousness, 2006.
- (2006) ‘The Grounds of Worship’ (with Tim Bayne), Religious Studies 42, pp. 299–313, 2006.
- (2005) ‘Omniscience and Physicalism: A Reply to Beyer’, Sophia 44, pp. 55-58, 2005.
- (2005) ‘I Can’t Make You Worship Me’ (with Campbell Brown), Ratio 18, pp. 138–144, 2005.
- (2005) ‘Anything You Can Do God Can Do Better’ (with Campbell Brown), American Philosophical Quarterly 42, pp. 221-227, 2005.
- (2005) ‘The Best of All Possible Worlds’ (with Campbell Brown), Synthese 143, pp. 309–320, 2005.
- (2005) ‘Chappell on the Consistency of Criticisms of Christianity’, Ratio 18, pp. 104-106, 2005.
- (2004) ‘Introduction’ (with Daniel Stoljar), in There is Something About Mary: Essays on Phenomenal Consciousness and Frank Jackson’s Knowledge Argument, MIT Press, pp. 1–36, 2004.
- (2004) ‘Skeptical Theism and Moral Skepticism: A Reply to Almeida and Oppy’ (with Nick Trakakis), Ars Disputandi 4, 2004.
- (2004) ‘Subjective Characters of Experience in Medical Ethics: A Reply to Atkins’, Journal of Applied Philosophy 21, pp. 219–223, 2004.
- (2004) ‘Salvation in Heaven?’ (with Graham Oppy and Nick Trakakis), Philosophical Papers, 33, pp. 95-117. Reprinted in Graham Oppy (2006) Arguing About Gods, Cambridge University Press, 2004.
- (2003) ‘Thomas vs. Thomas: A New Approach to Nagel’s Bat Argument’, Inquiry 46, pp. 377–394, 2003.
- (2003) ‘I Trust You, You’re a Doctor’, Australian Journal of Professional and Applied Ethics 5, pp. 70-73, 2003.
- (2003) ‘Moral Evil and Human Freedom: A Reply to Tierno’, Sophia 42, pp. 107–11, 2003.
- (2003) ‘SARS and Health Care Workers’ Duty’, Eubios Journal of Asian and International Bioethics 13, p. 208, 2003.
- (2003) ‘Divine Omniscience and Experience: A Reply to Alter’, Ars Disputandi 3, 2003.
- (2003) ‘Divine Omniscience and Knowledge De Se’, International Journal for Philosophy of Religion 53, pp. 73-82, 2003.
- (2003) ‘God’s Point of View: A Reply to Mander’, The Heythrop Journal 44, pp. 60–63, 2003.
- (2002) ‘Externalism and the Memory Argument’, Dialectica 56, pp. 335-346, 2002.
- (2002) ‘The Knowledge Argument Against Dualism’, Theoria LXVIII, pp. 205–223, 2002.
- (2000) ‘“Very-Slow-Switching” and Memory: A Critical Note on Ludlow’s Paper’, Acta Analytica 15, pp. 173–175, 2000.
