= John Hick =

English philosopher and theologian (1922–2012)

- Born: 20 January 1922; Scarborough, North Riding of Yorkshire, England
- Died: 9 February 2012 (aged 90); Birmingham, England
- Education: Oriel College, Oxford (DPhil, 1950); University of Edinburgh (DLitt, 1975)
- Spouse: Joan Hazel Bowers (m. 1953; died 1996)
- Children: 4

Philosophical work
- Era: 20th-century philosophy
- Region: Western philosophy
- School: Analytic philosophy
- Doctoral students: William Lane Craig
- Main interests: Philosophy of religion, theology
- Notable ideas: Soul-making theodicy, eschatological verification, the Real

John Harwood Hick (20 January 1922 – 9 February 2012) was an English philosopher and theologian, known for his contributions in the areas of theodicy, eschatology, Christology, epistemology of religion, and religious pluralism.

== Early life and education ==
John Harwood Hick was born on 20 January 1922 to a middle-class family in Scarborough in the North Riding of Yorkshire, England. In his teens he developed an interest in philosophy and religion, being encouraged by his uncle, who was an author and teacher at the University of Manchester. Hick initially went to Bootham School in York, which is Quaker, and then pursued a law degree at the University of Hull, but, having converted to Evangelical Christianity, he decided to change his career and he enrolled at the University of Edinburgh in 1941.

During his studies he became liable for military service in the Second World War, but, as a conscientious objector on moral grounds, he enrolled in the Friends' Ambulance Unit.

After the war he returned to Edinburgh and became attracted to the philosophy of Immanuel Kant, and began to question his fundamentalism. In 1948 he completed his MA thesis, which formed the basis of his book Faith and Knowledge. He went on to complete a D.Phil. at Oriel College, Oxford, in 1950 and a D.Litt. from Edinburgh in 1975. In 1977 he received an honorary doctorate from the Faculty of Theology at Uppsala University, Sweden.

In 1953 he married Joan Hazel Bowers (d. 1996). They had four children. After many years as a member of the United Reformed Church, in October 2009 he was accepted into membership of the Religious Society of Friends (Quakers) in Britain. He died of complications of pneumonia at Queen Elizabeth Hospital Birmingham on 9 February 2012 at the age of 90.

== Academic career ==
Hick's academic positions included Danforth Professor of the Philosophy of Religion at the Claremont Graduate University, California (where he taught from 1979 to 1992); H.G. Wood Professor of Theology at the University of Birmingham (1967-82); and Fellow of the Institute for Advanced Research in Arts and Social Sciences at the University of Birmingham. While at the University of Birmingham Hick played important roles in a number of organisations centred on community relations. Non-Christian communities, mostly Hindu, Muslim and Sikh, had begun to form in Birmingham as immigration from the Caribbean Islands and Indian subcontinent increased. Due to the influx of peoples with different religious traditions, organisations focused on integrating the community became necessary. During his fifteen years at the University of Birmingham, Hick became a founder, as well as the first chair, for the group All Faiths for One Race (AFFOR); he served as a chair on the Religious and Cultural Panel, which was a division of the Birmingham Community Relations Committee; and he also chaired the coordinating committee for a 1944 conference convened under the new Education Act 1944 with the aim of creating a new syllabus for religious instruction in city schools.

Between 1970 and 1974 Hick championed a substantially different theory of religious pluralism based, not on Immanuel Kant but on Sri Aurobindo, an Indian yogi (1872–1950).

He also held teaching positions at Cornell University, Princeton Theological Seminary and the University of Cambridge. During his teaching stay at Princeton Seminary, Hick began to depart from his conservative religious standings as he began to question "whether belief in the Incarnation required one to believe in the literal historicity of the Virgin Birth". This questioning would open the door for further examination of his own Christology, which would contribute to Hick's understanding of religious pluralism. He was vice-president of the British Society for the Philosophy of Religion and vice-president of the World Congress of Faiths.

Hick delivered the 1986–87 Gifford lectures and in 1991 was awarded the prestigious Grawemeyer Award from the University of Louisville and the Louisville Presbyterian Theological Seminary for Religion.

== Later life and death ==
After retiring as the Danforth Professor of Philosophy of Religion at Claremont Graduate University in California in 1992, he returned to Birmingham, where he lived until his death. Hick bequeathed his professional archives to the Cadbury Research Library Special Collections at the University of Birmingham.

== Philosophy and theology ==
Robert Smid states that Hick is regularly cited as "one of the most – if not simply the most – significant philosopher of religion in the twentieth century". Keith Ward once described him as "the greatest living philosopher of global religion." He is best known for his advocacy of religious pluralism, which is radically different from the traditional Christian teachings that he held when he was younger. Perhaps because of his heavy involvement with the inter-faith groups and his interaction with people of non-Christian faiths through those groups, Hick began to move toward a pluralistic outlook. He notes in both More Than One Way? and God and the Universe of Faiths that, as he came to know these people who belonged to non-Christian faiths, he saw in them the same values and moral actions that he recognised in his fellow-Christians. This observation led him to begin questioning how a completely loving God could possibly sentence non-Christians who clearly espouse values that are revered in Christianity to an eternity in hell. Hick then began to attempt to uncover the means by which all those devoted to a theistic religion might receive salvation.

Hick was criticised by Cardinal Joseph Ratzinger (the future Pope Benedict XVI from 2005 and 2013), when he was head of the Congregation for the Doctrine of the Faith. Ratzinger had examined the works of several theologians accused of relativism, such as Jacques Dupuis and Roger Haight, and found that many, if not all, were philosophically inspired by Hick. Therefore, the declaration Dominus Iesus was seen by many at the time as a condemnation of Hick's ideas and theories.

=== Kantian influences ===
Having begun his career as an evangelical, he moved towards pluralism as a way of reconciling God's love with the facts of cultural and religious diversity. He was primarily influenced by Kant in this regard, who argued that human minds obscure actual reality in favour of comprehension (see Kant's theory of perception). According to Richard Peters, for Hick, "[the] construal of the relationship of the human mind to God...is much like the relationship that Kant supposed exists between the human mind and the world".

Despite this, Hick was not strictly Kantian. Peters notes "the divide between the 'noumenal' and 'phenomenal' realms (so far as nature is concerned) is not nearly so severe for Hick as it was for Kant". Hick also declares that the Divine Being is what he calls 'transcategorial', where one can experience God through categories, but God himself obscures them by his very nature.

=== Pluralism ===
In light of his Kantian influences, Hick claims that knowledge of the Real (his generic term for Transcendent Reality) can only be known as it is being perceived. For that reason, absolute truth claims about God (to use Christian language) are really truth claims about perceptions of God; that is, claims about the phenomenal God and not the noumenal God. Furthermore, because all knowledge is rooted in experience, which is then perceived and interpreted into human categories of conception, cultural and historical contexts which inevitably influence human perception are necessarily components of knowledge of the Real. This means that knowledge of God and religious truth claims pertaining thereof are culturally and historically influenced; and for that reason should not be considered absolute. This is a significant aspect of Hick's argument against Christian exclusivism, which holds that although other religions might contain partial goodness and truth, salvation is provided only in Jesus Christ, and the complete truth of God is contained only in Christianity.

Perhaps the simplest manner in which to understand Hick's theory of pluralism of religions is to share the comparison he makes between his own understanding of religion and the Copernican view of the Solar System. Before Copernicus disseminated his views of the heliocentric model, the Ptolemaic system ruled in which the stars were painted in the sky, and the Sun rose and set around the Earth. In short, the rest of the universe existed for and was centred on Earth. On the other hand, Copernicus asserted that the Earth, and other planets as well, circled the Sun, which in fact, did not move, but only appeared to move due to the revolution of Earth. Copernicus introduced the understanding that other planets took similar paths around the Sun; while each path differed, all served the same purpose and generated the same result: every planet makes a full path around the Solar System's central star. Rotation of a planet about its axis creates day and night for that planet, just as day and night occur on Earth. Although the time frames for a full trip around the Sun and for a full day-night cycle differs on a planet-by-planet basis, the concept remains constant throughout the Solar System.

Similarly, Hick draws the metaphor that the Ptolemaic view of religion would be that Christianity is the only way to true salvation and knowledge of the one true God. Ptolemaic Christianity would assert that everything exists and all of history has played out in specific patterns for the glory of the Christian God, and that there is no other possible path that will lead to salvation. Hick appears as Copernicus, offering the belief that perhaps all theistic religions are focused toward the one true God and simply take different paths to achieve the same goal.

A speaker on religious pluralism, Keith E. Johnson, compares Hick's pluralistic theology to a tale of three blind men attempting to describe an elephant, one touching the leg, the second touching the trunk, the third feeling the elephant's side. Each man describes the elephant differently, and, although each is accurate, each is also convinced of their own correctness and the mistakenness of the other two.

Smid states that Hick believes that the tenets of Christianity are "no longer feasible in the present age, and must be effectively 'lowered'".

Moreover, Mark Mann notes that Hick argues that there have been people throughout history "who have been exemplars of the Real".

Hick's position is "not an exclusively Christian inclusivism [like that of Karl Rahner and his ‘Anonymous Christian’], but a plurality of mutually inclusive inclusivism." Hick contends that the diverse religious expressions (religions) are the result of diverse historically and culturally influenced responses to diverse perceptions of the Real. He states that "the different religious traditions, with their complex internal differentiations, have developed to meet the needs of the range of mentalities expressed in the different human cultures."

There have been many rebuttals to Hick's pluralism.

=== Christology ===
In his God and the Universe of Faiths (1973), Hick attempts to pinpoint the essence of Christianity. He first cites the Sermon on the Mount as being the basic Christian teaching, as it provides a practical way of living out the Christian faith. He says that "Christian essence is not to be found in beliefs about God...but in living as the disciples who in his name feed the hungry, heal the sick and create justice in the world." However, all of the teachings, including the Sermon on the Mount, that form what Hick calls the essence of Christianity, flow directly from Jesus' ministry. In turn, this means that the birth, life, death, and resurrection of Jesus form the permanent basis of the Christian tradition. Hick continues in this work to examine the manner in which the deification of Jesus took place in corporate Christianity following his crucifixion and questions whether or not Jesus actually thought of himself as the Messiah and the literal Son of God.

In several places (e.g. his contributions to The Myth of God Incarnate, and his book The Metaphor of God Incarnate) Hick proposes a reinterpretation of traditional Christology—particularly the doctrine of the Incarnation. Hick contends "that the historical Jesus of Nazareth did not teach or apparently believe that he was God, or God the Son, Second Person of a Holy Trinity, incarnate, or the son of God in a unique sense." It is for that reason, and perhaps for the sake of religious pluralism and peace, Hick proposes a metaphorical approach to incarnation. That is, Jesus (for example) was not literally God in the flesh (incarnate), but was metaphorically speaking, the presence of God. "Jesus was so open to divine inspiration, so responsive to the divine spirit, so obedient to God's will, that God was able to act on earth in and through him. This, I (Hick) believe, is the true Christian doctrine of the incarnation." Hick believes that a metaphorical view of the incarnation avoids the need for faulty Christian paradoxes such as the duality of Christ (fully God and fully human) and even the Trinity (God is simultaneously one and three).

Neither the intense christological debates of the centuries leading up to the Council of Chalcedon, nor the renewed christological debates of the 19th and 20th Centuries, have succeeded in squaring the circle by making intelligible the claim that one who was genuinely and unambiguously a man was also genuinely and unambiguously God.

=== Problem of evil ===
Hick has identified with a branch of theodicy that he calls "Irenaean theodicy" or the "Soul-Making Defence". A simplification of this view states that suffering exists as a means of spiritual development. In other words, God allows suffering so that human souls might grow or develop towards maturation. For Hick, God is ultimately responsible for pain and suffering, but such things are not truly bad. Perhaps with a greater degree of perception, one can see that the "evil" people experience through suffering is not ultimately evil but good, and as such is used to "make their souls" better.

Therefore, Hick sees the evils of pain and suffering as serving God's good purpose of bringing "imperfect and immature" humanity to itself "in uncompelled faith and love." At the same time, Hick acknowledges that this process often fails in the world. However, Hick asserts that, in the afterlife, "God will eventually succeed in His purpose of winning all men to Himself."

The discussion of evil in Hick has been challenged by a number of theologians and moral philosophers including David Griffin and John K. Roth. Using Hick's own words, Roth has stated, "Hick's theodicy is implausible to me because I am convinced that his claims about God's goodness cannot stand the onslaught of what he calls the principal threat to his own perspective: 'the sheer amount and intensity of both moral and natural evil.'" In the book Encountering Evil, Stephen Davis has stated his four criticisms of Hick, "First, while no theodicy is free of difficulties, I believe Hick's is not entirely convincing in its handling of the amount of evil that exists in the world... Second, I am dubious about Hick's hope of a gradual spiritual evolution till human beings reach a full state of God-consciousness... Third, I believe Hick also faces what I call the 'cost-effective' criticism of the free will defense... My final and most serious criticism of Hick concerns his commitment to universalism."

== Accusations of heresy ==
Hick was twice the subject of heresy proceedings. Additionally the Catholic Church heavily scrutinized his philosophy after Cardinal Joseph Ratzinger (the future Pope Benedict XVI) released the Vatican declaration Dominus Iesus which condemned Hick's religious pluralism, accusing his line of thought of promoting theological relativism.

=== First accusation ===
While trying to transfer his ministerial credentials to the Presbyterian Church in the United States after taking a post at Princeton Theological Seminary, Hick was questioned on his views. He explicitly refused to affirm the virgin birth of Jesus Christ as a literal historical fact. Local conservative church leaders strongly objected to his views and accused him of heresy. In 1962, the Judicial Committee of the church's General Assembly ultimately ruled in Hick's favor on constitutional grounds, sustaining his membership.

=== Second accusation ===
Later in his life, Hick faced further scrutiny from the United Reformed Church in England due to his work on religious pluralism had heavily shifted toward an "Arian" Christology, meaning he viewed Jesus as a human inspired by God rather than literally being God incarnate.Though he faced full heresy proceedings and trials, the church ultimately opted not to convict or defrock him.

== Works ==
For a list of his books see the referenced footnote.

- Faith and Knowledge, (1st ed. 1957, 2nd ed. 1966)
- The Existence of God, (ed.) (1st ed. 1964), Macmillan
- Evil and the God of Love, (1966, 1985, reissued 2007)
- The Many Faced Argument with Arthur C. McGill (1967, 2009).
- Philosophy of Religion (1970, 4th ed. 1990)
- God and the Universe of Faiths (1973)
- Death and the Eternal Life (1st ed. 1976); 1994 pbk edition
- (Editor) The Myth of God Incarnate (1977)
- (Editor with Paul F. Knitter) The Myth of Christian Uniqueness: Toward a Pluralistic Theology of Religions (1987) 2005 pbk edition
- A Christian Theology of Religions: The Rainbow of Faiths (Westminster John Knox Press, 1995) ISBN 9780664255961
- An Interpretation of Religion: Human Responses to the Transcendent (1989, reissued 2004)
- The Metaphor of God Incarnate (1993, 2nd ed. Westminster John Knox, 2005) ISBN 9780664230371
- The New Frontier of Religion and Science: Religious Experience, Neuroscience and the Transcendent (2006) ISBN 9780230507708

== See also ==
- Christian universalism
- Eschatological verification
