= List of British philosophers =

This page provides a list of British philosophers; of people who either worked within Great Britain, or the country's citizens working abroad.

== A ==
- Elizabeth Anscombe
- J. L. Austin
- A. J. Ayer

== B ==
- Francis Bacon
- Roger Bacon
- Julian Baggini
- Thomas Baldwin
- Alexander Bain
- John Renford Bambrough
- Owen Barfield
- Jonathan Barnes
- Shahidha Bari
- David Bell
- Piers Benn
- Jonathan Bennett
- Jeremy Bentham
- George Berkeley
- Isaiah Berlin
- Simon Blackburn
- George Boole
- Mary Everest Boole
- Emma Borg
- F. H. Bradley
- R. B. Braithwaite
- Ray Brassier
- Bill Brewer
- C. D. Broad
- John Broome
- Thomas Browne
- Malcolm Budd
- Jeremy Butterfield
- Stephen Butterfill

== C ==
- John Cartwright
- Howard Caygill
- Quassim Cassam
- Peter Caws
- G. K. Chesterton
- Stephen R. L. Clark
- Frances Power Cobbe
- Catherine Trotter Cockburn
- David Cockburn
- R. G. Collingwood
- David Conway
- John Cook Wilson
- David E. Cooper
- John Cottingham
- Edward Craig
- Tim Crane
- David Cranston
- Elizabeth Cripps
- Roger Crisp
- Simon Critchley
- Helena Cronin
- Ralph Cudworth
- Nathaniel Culverwel

== D ==
- Jonathan Dancy
- Augustus De Morgan
- Peter Dews
- Ramsey Dukes
- Michael Dummett
- Duns Scotus

== E ==
- Arthur Eddington
- Dorothy Edgington
- Nader El-Bizri
- Ronald Englefield
- Dylan Evans
- Gareth Evans
- A. C. Ewing

== F ==
- Antony Flew
- Philippa Foot
- Keith Frankish
- Paul W. Franks
- Miranda Fricker

== G ==
- W. B. Gallie
- Patrick Gardiner
- Peter Geach
- Raymond Geuss
- Margaret Gilbert
- Jonathan Glover
- William Godwin
- Philip Goff
- Iain Hamilton Grant
- John N. Gray
- A. C. Grayling
- Celia Green
- Thomas Hill Green
- John Grote
- David Guest

== H ==
- Susan Haack
- Peter Hacker
- John Joseph Haldane
- Bob Hale
- Stuart Hampshire
- Edward Harcourt
- R. M. Hare
- Harold Foster Hallett
- Jane Heal
- Erich Heller
- John Hick
- Alison Hills
- J. M. Hinton
- Thomas Hobbes
- Angie Hobbs
- Richard Holton
- Ted Honderich
- Christopher Hookway
- Jennifer Hornsby
- Paul Horwich
- Gillian Howie
- Colin Howson
- David Hume
- Francis Hutcheson
- Aldous Huxley

== J ==
- Harold Joachim
- C. E. M. Joad
- John Foster
- John Henry Newman

== K ==
- Bernard Philip Kelly
- Anthony Kenny
- Damien Keown
- Philip Kitcher
- Augusta Klein
- Martha Klein
- Brian Klug
- William Angus Knight
- Arthur Koestler
- Stephan Körner
- Martin Kusch

== L ==
- John Laird
- Nick Land
- Gerald Lang
- Rae Helen Langton
- Vernon Lee
- James Lenman
- Mike Lesser
- John Levy
- C.S. Lewis
- Casimir Lewy
- David Liggins
- John Locke
- E.J. Lowe
- John Lucas
- Anthony Ludovici

== M ==
- John McDowell
- Cecil Alec Mace
- Margaret MacDonald
- J. L. Mackie
- John Macmurray
- Fiona Macpherson
- Bryan Magee
- Nicholas Maxwell
- Hugh Mellor
- Mary Midgley
- John Stuart Mill
- Alan Millar
- David Miller
- Ray Monk
- George Edward Moore
- Charles Morris, Baron Morris of Grasmere
- Stephen Mulhall
- Kevin Mulligan
- Stephen Mumford
- Iris Murdoch
- Geoffrey Reginald Gilchrist Mure

== N ==
- Constance Naden
- Stephen Neale

== O ==
- Michael Oakeshott
- Kieron O'Hara
- Onora O'Neill, Baroness O'Neill of Bengarve
- William of Ockham
- Sydney Sparkes Orr
- Peter Osborne

== P ==
- Thomas Paine
- William Paley
- David Papineau
- Derek Parfit
- Christopher Peacocke
- David Pearce
- William Penn
- Sadie Plant
- Michael Polanyi
- Karl Popper
- Ullin Place
- Graham Priest

== Q ==
- Anthony Quinton, Baron Quinton

== R ==
- Janet Radcliffe Richards
- Hastings Rashdall
- Frank P. Ramsey
- Carveth Read
- Rupert Read
- Thomas Reid
- Howard Robinson
- R. R. Rockingham Gill
- Gonzalo Rodríguez Pereyra
- Gillian Rose
- Robert Rowland Smith
- Richard Rufus of Cornwall
- Bertrand Russell
- Gilbert Ryle

== S ==
- Mark Sacks
- Mark Sainsbury
- Constantine Sandis
- F. C. S. Schiller
- Roger Scruton
- Niall Shanks
- Mary Shepherd
- Henry Sidgwick
- Peter Simons
- Timothy Smiley
- Adam Smith
- Alic Halford Smith
- Kate Soper
- William Ritchie Sorley
- Timothy Sprigge
- Olaf Stapledon
- Susan Stebbing
- James Hutchison Stirling
- William Stoddart
- Tom Stoneham
- Alan Stout
- George Stout
- Galen Strawson
- P. F. Strawson
- Richard Swinburne

== T ==
- Alfred Edward Taylor
- Gabriele Taylor
- Jenny Teichman
- Alan Thomas
- George Derwent Thomson
- John Toland

== U ==
- J. O. Urmson

== W ==
- Alfred North Whitehead
- Richard Rudolf Walzer
- James Ward
- Mary Warnock, Baroness Warnock
- Alan Watts
- Jonathan Westphal
- Jared Webb
- William Whewell
- Jamie Whyte
- David Wiggins
- Bernard Williams
- Timothy Williamson
- Gerrard Winstanley
- John Wisdom
- Ludwig Wittgenstein
- Richard Wollheim
- Crispin Wright
- Frances Wright
