= Aristotelian Society =

British philosophy organization

- Aristotelian Society for the Systematic Study of Philosophy
- Abbreviation: AS
- Founded: April 19, 1880; 146 years ago
- Founder: F. G. Fleay; Alfred Senier; Herbert Burrows; Edward Clarkson; Alfred Lowe
- Type: Cultural association
- Headquarters: London
- President: Shadworth Hodgson (first); Lucy O'Brien (currently)

The Aristotelian Society for the Systematic Study of Philosophy, more generally known as the Aristotelian Society, is a philosophical society in London.

== History ==
Aristotelian Society was founded at a meeting on 19 April 1880, at 17 Bloomsbury Square, London.

It resolved "to constitute a society of about twenty and to include ladies; the society to meet fortnightly, on Mondays at 8 o'clock, at the rooms of the Spelling Reform Association…" The rules of the society stipulated:

The object of this Society shall be the systematic study of philosophy; 1st, as to its historical development; 2nd, as to its methods and problems.

According to H. Wildon Carr, in choosing a name for the society, it was:

essential to find a name that would definitely prescribe the study's speculative character, which was to be the Society's ideal, and it seemed that this could best be secured by adopting the name of a philosopher eminently representative. There is only one such name in the history of philosophy and so we became the Aristotelian Society, not for the special study of Aristotle, or of Aristotelianism, but for the systematic study of Philosophy."

The society's first president was Shadworth H. Hodgson. He was president for fourteen years from 1880 until 1894, when he proposed Dr. Bernard Bosanquet as his replacement.

Professor Alan Willard Brown noted in 1947 that '[The Society]'s members were not all men of established intellectual position. It welcomed young minds just out of university as well as older amateur philosophers with serious interests and purposes. But many distinguished men were faithful members, and not the least virtue of the society has remained, even to the present day, the opportunity it affords for different intellectual generations to meet in an atmosphere of reasoned and responsible discussion.'."

The society continues to meet fortnightly at the University of London's Senate House to hear and discuss philosophical papers from all philosophical traditions. The current President (2016–2017) is Tim Crane, a Professor of Philosophy at University of Cambridge. Its other work includes giving grants to support the organisation of academic conferences in philosophy, and, with Oxford University Press, the production of the 'Lines of Thought' series of philosophical monographs.

In the 1960s, Ved Mehta dubbed the "exclusive" Aristotelian Society the "crème de la crème of all philosophical societies."

== Annual conference ==
The society's annual conference, organised since 1918 in conjunction with the Mind Association, (publishers of the philosophical journal Mind), is known as the Joint Session of the Aristotelian Society and the Mind Association, and is hosted by different university departments in July each year.

== Publications ==
Proceedings of the Aristotelian Society
- Language: English

Publication details
- Former name: Proceedings of the Aristotelian Society for the Systematic Study of Philosophy
- History: 1888–present
- Publisher: Oxford University Press (United Kingdom)

Standard abbreviations
- ISO 4: Proc. Aristot. Soc.

Indexing
- ISSN: 0066-7374 (print); 1467-9264 (web)
- LCCN: 09033277
- JSTOR: 00667374
- OCLC no.: 224535586

Links
- Journal homepage; Online access; Online archive

Proceedings of the Aristotelian Society, Supplementary Volumes
- Language: English

Publication details
- History: 1918–present
- Publisher: Oxford University Press (United Kingdom)

Standard abbreviations
- ISO 4: Proc. Aristot. Soc. Suppl. Vol.

Indexing
- ISSN: 0309-7013 (print); 1467-8349 (web)
- LCCN: 92658673
- JSTOR: 03097013
- OCLC no.: 609926388

Links
- Journal homepage; Online access; Online archive

The first edition of the society's proceedings, the Proceedings of the Aristotelian Society for the Systematic Study of Philosophy, now the Proceedings of the Aristotelian Society, was issued in 1888.

Papers from invited speakers at the Joint Session conference are published in June each year (i.e., before the joint conference) in The Proceedings of the Aristotelian Society, Supplementary Volume.

The Proceedings and the Supplementary Volume are published by the society and distributed by Oxford University Press. The back run of both journals has been digitised by JSTOR.

== List of current and past presidents ==
Many significant philosophers have served the society as its president:

- Shadworth H. Hodgson (1880–1894)
- Bernard Bosanquet (1894–1898)
- D. G. Ritchie (1898–1899)
- G. F. Stout (1899–1904)
- Hastings Rashdall (1904–1907)
- Lord Haldane of Cloan (1907–1908)
- Samuel Alexander (1908–1911)
- Bertrand Russell (1911–1913)
- G. Dawes Hicks (1913–1914)
- Arthur Balfour (1914–1915)
- H. Wildon Carr (1915–1918)
- G. E. Moore (1918–1919)
- James Ward (1919–1920)
- W. R. Inge (1920–1921)
- F. C. S. Schiller (1921–1922)
- A. N. Whitehead (1922–1923)
- Percy Nunn (1923–1924)
- Lord Lindsay of Birker (1924–1925)
- J. A. Smith (1925–1926)
- C. Lloyd Morgan (1926–1927)
- C. D. Broad (1927–1928)
- A. E. Taylor (1928–1929)
- J. Laird (1929–1930)
- Beatrice Edgell (1930–1931)
- W. G. de Burgh (1931–1932)
- Leonard J. Russell (1932–1933)
- L. Susan Stebbing (1933–1934)
- G. C. Field (1934–1935)
- J. L. Stocks (1935–1936)
- Samuel Alexander (1936–1937)
- Bertrand Russell (1937–1938)
- G. F. Stout (1938–1939)
- Sir William David Ross (1939–1940)
- Hilda D. Oakeley (1940–1941)
- A. C. Ewing (1941–1942)
- Morris Ginsberg (1942–1943)
- H. H. Price (1943–1944)
- H. J. Paton (1944–1945)
- Gilbert Ryle (1945–1946)
- R. B. Braithwaite (1946–1947)
- Norman Kemp Smith (1947–1948)
- C. A. Mace (1948–1949)
- William Kneale (1949–1950)
- John Wisdom (1950–1951)
- A. J. Ayer (1951–1952)
- H. B. Acton (1952–1953)
- Dorothy Emmet (1953–1954)
- C. D. Broad (1954–1955)
- J. N. Findlay (1955–1956)
- J. L. Austin (1956–1957)
- R. I. Aaron (1957–1958)
- Karl Popper (1958–1959)
- H. L. A. Hart (1959–1960)
- A. E. Duncan-Jones (1960–1961)
- A. M. MacIver (1961–1962)
- H. D. Lewis (1962–1963)
- Sir Isaiah Berlin (1963–1964)
- W. H. Walsh (1964–1965)
- Ruth L. Saw (1965–1966)
- Stephan Körner (1966–1967)
- Richard Wollheim (1967–1968)
- D. J. O'Connor (1968–1969)
- P. F. Strawson (1969–1970)
- W. B. Gallie (1970–1971)
- Martha Kneale (1971–1972)
- R. M. Hare (1972–1973)
- Charles H. Whiteley (1973–1974)
- David Daiches Raphael (1974–1975)
- A. M. Quinton (1975–1976)
- D. M. Mackinnon (1976–1977)
- D. W. Hamlyn (1977–1978)
- G. E. L. Owen (1978–1979)
- Alan R. White (1979–1980)
- P. G. Winch (1980–1981)
- R. F. Holland (1981–1982)
- Timothy Smiley (1982–1983)
- A. R. Manser (1983–1984)
- Peter Alexander (1984–1985)
- Richard Sorabji (1985–1986)
- Martin Hollis (1986–1987)
- G. E. M. Anscombe (1987–1988)
- Onora O'Neill (1988–1989)
- Renford Bambrough (1989–1990)
- John Skorupski (1990–1991)
- Timothy Sprigge (1991–1992)
- Hugh Mellor (1992–1993)
- David E. Cooper (1993–1994)
- Jonathan Dancy (1994–1995)
- Christopher Hookway (1995–1996)
- Jennifer Hornsby (1996–1997)
- John Cottingham (1997–1998)
- Adam Morton (1998–1999)
- David Wiggins (1999–2000)
- James Griffin (2000–2001)
- Jane Heal (2001–2002)
- Bob Hale (2002–2003)
- Paul Snowdon (2003–2004)
- Timothy Williamson (2004–2005)
- Myles Burnyeat (2005–2006)
- Thomas Baldwin (2006–2007)
- Dorothy Edgington (2007–2008)
- M G F Martin (2008–2009)
- Simon Blackburn (2009–2010)
- Quassim Cassam (2010–2011)
- Marie McGinn (2011–2012)
- Sarah Broadie (2012–2013)
- David Papineau (2013–2014)
- A. W. Moore (2014–2015)
- Susan James (2015–2016)
- Tim Crane (2016–2017)
- Helen Beebee (2017–2018)
- Jo Wolff (2018–2019)
- Helen Steward (2019–2020)
- Bill Brewer (2020–2021)
- Robert Stern (2021–2022)
- M. M. McCabe (2022–2023)
- Scott Sturgeon (2023–2024)
- Fabienne Peter (2024–2025)
- Lucy O'Brien (2025–Present)
