= Professor of Moral Philosophy =

Professor of Moral Philosophy may refer to:

- White's Professor of Moral Philosophy at the University of Oxford
- Professor of Moral Philosophy (Glasgow) at the University of Glasgow
- Knightbridge Professor of Philosophy at the University of Cambridge
- Regius Professor of Moral Philosophy at the University of Aberdeen
- Chair of Moral Philosophy (Edinburgh) at the University of Edinburgh
