= List of fellows of the British Academy elected in the 1950s =

The British Academy consists of world-leading scholars and researchers in the humanities and social sciences. Each year, it elects fellows to its membership. The following were elected in the 1950s.

== 1950 ==
- Professor A. F. Blunt
- Sir Cyril Burt
- C. T. Clay
- Professor W. J. Entwistle
- Professor W. K. Hancock
- W. C. Kneale
- Dr K. T. Parker
- Dr H. N. Randle

== 1951 ==
- Professor P. Alexander
- Professor T. S. Ashton
- Professor C. R. Cheney
- Dr J. G. D. Clark
- Professor A. R. Johnson
- Professor J. E. Meade
- J. B. Ward Perkins
- Professor A. R. Radcliffe-Brown
- Rev. Professor N. Sykes
- Professor J. Wilde

== 1952 ==
- Professor R. G. D. Allen
- Professor A. J. Ayer
- Professor A. M. Blackman
- Sir Cecil Carr
- Dr D. A. E. Garrod
- Dr A. L. Goodhart
- G. T. Griffith
- W. K. C. Guthrie
- Sir James Mann
- A. P. Oppé
- Professor J. Orr
- Professor D. L. Page
- Dr A. L. Poole
- H. G. Richardson
- Dr E. M. W. Tillyard
- Professor J. M. C. Toynbee
- Professor K. C. Wheare

== 1953 ==
- Professor J. Cerny
- Professor E. J. Dent
- Professor M. Ginsberg
- Professor R. H. Lightfoot
- Professor W. L. Lorimer
- Professor S. Piggott
- Lady Stenton
- Professor J. R. Sutherland
- Professor F. W. Walbank
- Dr E. J. Wellesz

== 1954 ==
- D. J. Allan
- Professor R. R. Darlington
- H. J. Davis
- C. H. S. Fifoot
- Professor H. Frankfort
- Professor W. B. Henning
- Professor M. E. L. Mallowan
- Professor A. D. Momigliano
- S. Morison
- Professor L. J. Russell
- P. Sraffa
- J. N. Summerson
- L. S. Sutherland
- Rev. Dr V. Taylor
- Professor J. A. Westrup

== 1955 ==
- Professor R. I. Aaron
- Very Rev. Matthew Black
- Professor D. W. Brogan
- Professor Andrew Browning
- Dr Florence E. Harmer
- Sir Ivor Jennings
- Dr Kathleen M. Kenyon
- Professor H. D. F. Kitto
- Professor C. S. Lewis
- Seton H. F. Lloyd
- John W. Pope-Hennessy
- Professor E. A. G. Robinson
- Dr H. H. Scullard
- Dr Friedrich Waismann
- Professor E. K. Waterhouse

== 1956 ==
- H. S. Bennett
- E. H. Carr
- N. K. Chadwick
- Professor E. E. Evans-Pritchard
- Professor J. N. Findlay
- Professor F. H. Lawson
- Dr O. E. Pacht
- C. A. R. Radford
- A. N. Sherwin-White
- Professor W. Simon
- Professor J. R. N. Stone
- A. J. P. Taylor
- Professor E. G. Turner
- Dr R. R. Walzer
- Dr Dorothy Whitelock
- Dr G. Zuntz

== 1957 ==
- Professor A. Andrewes
- Sir Isaiah Berlin
- Professor C. R. Boxer
- Professor R. B. Braithwaite
- A. M. Dale
- Professor D. Daube
- Professor A. Ewert
- Professor K. H. Jackson
- Dr L. Minio-Paluello
- Dr K. P. Oakley
- Hon. Sir Steven Runciman
- Professor R. S. Sayers
- G. F. Webb
- Dr G. L. Williams

== 1958 ==
- Professor J. L. Austin
- Dr D. R. S. Bailey
- Helen Gardner
- P. Grierson
- N. R. Ker
- Dr L. S. B. Leakey
- Professor K. R. Popper
- J. V. Robinson
- Dr A. L. Rowse
- Professor I. Schapera
- Professor T. B. Smith
- Professor E. C. S. Wade
- Dr J. Walker
- Professor R. P. Winnington-Ingram
- Professor R. Wittkower

== 1959 ==
- Dr H. Buchthal
- Professor Bruce Dickins
- Dr A. B. Emden
- Professor W. B. Emery
- Dr O. R. Gurney
- G. S. Kirk
- Dr Thomas Parry
- Professor M. M. Postan
- Rev. Professor H. F. D. Sparks
- J. E. S. Thompson

== See also ==
- Fellows of the British Academy
