= Leonard J. Russell (philosopher) =

British philosopher

Leonard James Russell, FBA (18 October 1884 – 8 March 1971) was a British philosopher. He was Professor of Philosophy at the University of Birmingham from 1925 to 1950.

== Early life and education ==
Russell was born on 18 October 1884 in Birmingham, where his father (the Rev. E. T. Russell) was working as a missionary. His older brother was the agricultural scientist Sir John Russell. The family moved to Barnsley, where Russell attended a local school and then they moved again to Glasgow, when Russell was aged 13, after his father became a Unitarian minister there. He then attended Hutchesons' Grammar School before studying mathematics and natural philosophy at the University of Glasgow from 1902.

He graduated with an MA in 1905 and a BSc in 1907. He was taught by John Swinnerton Phillimore, Sir Henry Jones and David Picken, the latter of whom gave some instruction on the philosophy of mathematics, which was then a topic of much interest from philosophers including Gottlob Frege, Bertrand Russell and A. N. Whitehead. After completing his degrees, Russell's prize money allowed him to keep studying and began working towards the honours school in English literature under Macneile Dixon, but in 1908 Glasgow's professor of logic, Robert Latta, encouraged him to study in the University of Cambridge as preparation for an academic career at Glasgow. He then went to Emmanuel College, Cambridge, and completed an advanced course on logic delivered by W. E. Johnson; he attended these with John Laird and C. D. Broad, and struck up a friendship with the geographer Griffith Taylor.

== Career ==
In 1910, Russell returned to the University of Glasgow to become lecturer in logic. During this time, he completed a thesis for a PhD, which was awarded in 1914. That year, he wrote an Introduction to Logic from the Standpoint of Education. In the meantime, he increasingly took an interest in the logic of the Enlightenment polymath Gottfried Wilhelm Leibniz, which was the specialism of Latta. After the First World War, he began work on producing an edition of Leibniz's papers for the Prussian Academy of Sciences, but the political instability in Germany prevented its realisation. In 1923, Russell was appointed Professor of Philosophy at the University of Bristol (succeeding his old Cambridge colleague C. D. Broad). After only two years, he moved to the University of Birmingham in 1925 to be Professor of Philosophy and remained there until he retired in 1950. A popular lecturer, he also served as dean of the Faculty of Arts from 1937 to 1940 and acting dean from 1941 to 1943. During this period, teaching and administrative duties occupied him more than his studies, though he authored Introduction to Philosophy in 1929, which was based on broadcasts he had given on the topic.

Russell was president of the Aristotelian Society and the Mind Association for the 1932–33 year, and oversaw the preparations for a new journal, Analysis. He was a visiting professor at Stanford University in 1932 and was a Nuffield Foundation Visiting Lecturer in Australia in 1951 and that year gave the Hertz Philosophical Lecture at the British Academy; he was elected a fellow of the academy in 1954. He died on 8 March 1971.
