= Susan Stebbing =

British philosopher (1885–1943)

- Stebbing by Howard Coster (1939)
- Born: Lizzie Susan Stebbing; 2 December 1885; North Finchley, Middlesex, England
- Died: 11 September 1943 (aged 57); Northwood, Middlesex, England

Education
- Education: Girton College, Cambridge
- Academic advisor: William Ernest Johnson

Philosophical work
- Era: 20th-century philosophy
- Region: Western philosophy
- School: Analytic philosophy Logical positivism
- Institutions: King's College London
- Doctoral students: Margaret MacDonald
- Main interests: Logic
- Notable ideas: Ordinary language as adequately describing everyday experience

Lizzie Susan Stebbing (2 December 1885 – 11 September 1943) was a British philosopher. She belonged to the 1930s generation of analytic philosophy, and was a founder in 1933 of the journal Analysis. Stebbing was the first woman to hold a philosophy chair in the United Kingdom, as well as the first female President of Humanists UK.

== Biography ==
Born in North Finchley, Middlesex, Susan Stebbing (as she preferred to be called), was the youngest of six children born to Alfred Charles Stebbing and Elizabeth (née Elstob), and was orphaned at an early age.

Stebbing was educated at James Allen's Girls' School, Dulwich, until she went, in 1904, to Girton College, Cambridge, to read history (though Cambridge did not award degrees or full University membership to women at the time). Having come across F. H. Bradley's Appearance and Reality she became interested in philosophy and stayed on to take part I of the Moral Sciences tripos in 1908. This was followed by a University of London M.A. in philosophy in 1912 that was awarded with distinction. Her thesis for the same, Pragmatism and French Voluntarism, subsequently being published in the Girton College Studies series.

From 1911 to 1924 she held a number of teaching appointments. She was lecturer in philosophy at King's College, London, from 1913 to 1915, when she became part-time lecturer in philosophy at Bedford College, London; this was made a full-time position in 1920 and in 1924 she was appointed as a Reader there. She also held visiting lectureships at Westfield College, London (1912–20), Girton College, Cambridge (1911–14), and Homerton College, Cambridge (1911–14). From 1915 until her death she was principal of the Kingsley Lodge School for Girls, Hampstead.

In 1927 the London University title of reader in philosophy was conferred upon her and held in conjunction with her position at Bedford College. She gained a DLitt in 1931. Stebbing was promoted to professor in 1933, thus becoming the first woman to hold a philosophy chair in the United Kingdom, an event that was, as Siobhan Chapman notes, "headline news". She was also a visiting professor at Columbia University from 1931 to 1932. She was president of the Mind Association from 1931 to 1932 and the Aristotelian Society from 1933 to 1934.

Stebbing was a pupil of William Ernest Johnson; according to John Wisdom she was most influenced by G. E. Moore, and was a point of contact with the Vienna Circle, first inviting Rudolf Carnap to talk in the UK.

Stebbing died, following the return of a cancer, on 11 September 1943 at Mount Vernon Hospital, in Northwood, Middlesex.

== Legacy ==
Following her early death, a group of scholars, including C. D. Broad, G. E. Moore, Helen Wodehouse and Dorothy Tarrant set up the L. S. Stebbing Memorial Fund to endow a scholarship for graduate study in philosophy. The Susan Stebbing Studentship now offers a stipend each year to a female graduate student in Philosophy at King's College London, which also now has a chair of philosophy named in her honour.

A posthumous Festschrift titled Philosophical Studies. Essays in Memory of L. Susan Stebbing, was published in 1948 on behalf of the Aristotelian Society. It included an appreciation by John Wisdom and a full bibliography of Stebbing's writings. And essay contributions from, amongst others, H.B. Acton, Beatrice Edgell, A.C. Ewing, Ruth L. Saw. and (her best known student) Max Black.

In a 1949 review of that work for Nature, physicist F. I. G. Rawlins noted that in "a life not free from controversy":

"Prof. Stebbing assuredly selected her targets with a refined academic glee, as, for example, in her Philosophy and the Physicists (1937). The thrusts she delivered seem somewhat on the harsh side; maybe they were not intended to endure. Her whole being brings into relief the difference between logic bent upon truth, and aesthetics bent upon beauty. In her greatness, she lived for the former, others perhaps for the latter. But one day a 'pontiff' will arise and throw a bridge across the narrows; when that happens, the sheer weight of her thought will help to anchor it well and truly on her territory."

Stebbing's philosophical significance has been more recently recognised by, and explored within, the Stanford Encyclopedia of Philosophy, which commissioned, and in 2017 published, a publicly accessible online entry on her life and work by Michael Beaney and Siobhan Chapman. The first book-length study of Stebbing's life and thought was published by Chapman in 2013.

== Thinking to Some Purpose ==
Stebbing's most popular work is Thinking to Some Purpose (1939), a book commissioned by Pelican Books and described on the cover as: "A manual of first-aid to clear thinking, showing how to detect illogicalities in other people's mental processes and how to avoid them in our own." One of the more quoted passages of the book did not in fact appear in the main body of the work but on the first inside of the dust jacket of the 1939 printing and in the front matter of subsequent printings prior to 1952. As it appeared in print (in both 1939 and 1941) it runs, in full, as follows:

"There is an urgent need to-day," writes Professor Stebbing, "for the citizens of a democracy to think well. It is not enough to have freedom of the Press and parliamentary institutions. Our difficulties are due partly to our own stupidity, partly to the exploitation of that stupidity, and partly to our own prejudices and personal desires."

The work arose out of a synopsis she wrote for a series of radio broadcasts intended for the BBC. Published on the eve of the Second World War, Stebbing wrote in the Preface:

"I am convinced of the urgent need for a democratic people to think clearly without the distortions due to unconscious bias and unrecognized ignorance. Our failures in thinking are in part due to faults which we could to some extent overcome were we to see clearly how these faults arise." p.9 [1952]

Chapter VI opens thus:

"Some forms of ineffective thinking are due to our not unnatural desire to have confident beliefs about complicated matters with regard to which we must take some action or other. We are sometimes too lazy, usually too busy, and often too ignorant to think out what is involved in the statements we so readily accept. ...we easily fall into the habit of accepting compressed statements which save us from the trouble of thinking. Thus arises what I shall call 'Potted Thinking'. This metaphor seems to me to be appropriate, because potted thinking is easily accepted, is concentrated in form, and has lost the vitamins essential to mental nourishment. You will notice that I have continued the metaphor by using the word 'vitamins.' Do not accept the metaphor too hastily: it must be expanded. Potted meat is sometimes a convenient form of food; it may be tasty, it contains some nourishment. But its nutritive value is not equivalent to that of the fresh meat from which it was potted. Also, it must have originally been made from fresh meat, and must not be allowed to grow stale. Similarly a potted belief is convenient; it can be stated briefly, sometimes also in a snappy manner likely to attract attention. A potted belief should be the outcome of a belief that is not potted. It should not be held on to when circumstances have changed and new factors have come to light. We should not allow our habits of thought to close our minds, nor rely upon catch-words to save ourselves from the labour of thinking. Vitamins are essential for the natural growth of our bodies; the critical questioning at times of our potted beliefs is necessary for the development of our capacity to think to some purpose." p.67–68 [1952]

== Works ==
=== Books ===
- Pragmatism and French Voluntarism (1914)
- A Modern Introduction to Logic (1930, revised 1933)
- Logical Positivism and Analysis (1933)
- Logic in Practice (1934)
- Imagination and Thinking (1936) with C. Day-Lewis
- Philosophy and the Physicists (1937)
- Thinking to Some Purpose (1939)
- Ideals and Illusions (1941)
- A Modern Elementary Logic (1943)
- Men and Moral Principles. L. T. Hobhouse Memorial Trust Lecture No. 13. (1944)

=== Papers ===
- "Dr. McTaggart and "Idealism"", Mind New Series, Vol. 35, No. 138 (Apr., 1926), pp. 267–268.
- "The Method of Analysis in Metaphysics", Proceedings of the Aristotelian Society, Volume 33, Issue 1, 1 June 1933, pp. 65–94.
- "Nebulous Philosophy—Jeans and Eddington", The American Scholar, Vol. 6, No. 1 (WINTER 1937), pp. 71-84.
- "Some Puzzles about Analysis", Proceedings of the Aristotelian Society New Series, Vol. 39 (1938-1939), pp. 69-84.
- "Language and Misleading Questions", The Journal of Unified Science (Erkenntnis), Vol. 8, No. 1/3 (Jun. 1, 1939), pp. 1–6.
- "Moore's Influence", in Paul Schilpp (ed.) The Philosophy of G.E. Moore, Volume 2 (1942)
