= Parable of the Invisible Gardener =

Philosophical tale

The Parable of the Invisible Gardener was first introduced by philosopher John Wisdom in his essay "Gods," published in the Proceedings of the Aristotelian Society (1944–45). Wisdom’s version featured two people who return to a garden and argue whether a gardener is responsible for its state, although no one is ever seen.

British philosopher Antony Flew later adapted and popularized the parable in a more vivid form during a 1950 symposium at Oxford University, later published in various collections. In Flew’s version, two explorers discover a jungle clearing filled with flowers and weeds. One insists there must be a gardener, while the other disagrees. They watch for the gardener, install electric fences, and use bloodhounds — but no evidence appears. The believer eventually claims the gardener is invisible, intangible, and undetectable. Flew concludes with the skeptic’s challenge:

"But what remains of your original assertion? Just how does what you call an invisible, incorporeal, eternally elusive gardener differ from an imaginary gardener or even from no gardener at all?"

Flew used the parable to illustrate his principle of falsifiability, arguing that beliefs must be open to potential disproof to be meaningful. If religious believers keep redefining God in ways that evade any test or evidence, Flew argued, the concept loses all meaning and dies "the death of a thousand qualifications."

The parable also played a central role in later debates about religious language, such as R. M. Hare’s response with his concept of "bliks"—unfalsifiable but psychologically important worldviews. More recently, philosophers such as Randal Rauser have argued that both theists and atheists can sometimes defend their views with unfalsifiable claims, making the parable relevant to discussions beyond theism.
