= Daniel O'Connor =

Daniel O'Connor may refer to:

== Politics ==
- Daniel O'Connor (politician) (1844–1914), Australian colonial politician and businessman
- Danny O'Connor (Northern Irish politician) (born 1965), former Social Democratic and Labour Party representative in Northern Ireland
- Danny O'Connor (Ohio politician) (born 1986), American Democratic congressional nominee

== Sport ==
- Daniel O'Connor (athlete) (born 1952), American Olympic racewalker
- Dan O'Connor (baseball) (1868–1942), Canadian Major League Baseball player
- Dan O'Connor (American football) (1894–1964), professional American football player
- Danny O'Connor (footballer) (born 1980), Irish footballer
- Danny O'Connor (boxer) (born 1985), American boxer
- Danny O'Connor (bowls) (?–2017), New Zealand lawn bowls player

== Other uses ==
- Dan O'Connor (prospector) (1864–1933), Canadian businessman and prospector
- Dan O'Connor, lead singer and guitarist of the pop punk band Four Year Strong
- Dan O'Connor (actor) (born 1978), Australian actor and singer
- Danny O'Connor (born 1949), American recording artist; see Canary Conn
- Daniel O'Connor (bishop)
- Daniel J O'Connor, British philosopher
- Danny Boy (rapper) (Daniel O'Connor, born 1968), American rapper, art director, and executive director of the Outsiders House Museum

== See also ==
- Daniel Connor (disambiguation)
