= Margaret MacDonald (philosopher) =

British analytic philosopher

- Born: 9 April 1903; London, England
- Died: 7 January 1956 (aged 52); London, England

Academic background
- Doctoral advisor: Susan Stebbing
- Other advisor: Ludwig Wittgenstein

Margaret MacDonald (9 April 1903 – 7 January 1956) was a British analytic philosopher. She worked in the areas of philosophy of language, political philosophy and aesthetics.

== Life and education ==
Margaret MacDonald was born in London and abandoned as a child.

She was educated at University College London and was awarded a first class degree in philosophy in 1932, followed by a PhD in 1934. Her PhD supervisor was Susan Stebbing who provided MacDonald with financial assistance during her research. The fees for her last year were covered by a John Stuart Mill Scholarship. In 1932 she joined the Aristotelian Society and became a participant in their meetings.

MacDonald joined Girton College, Cambridge, as a Pfeiffer Research Fellow in Moral Sciences between 1934 and 1937. While at Cambridge, she studied under G.E. Moore and was part of the inner circle of students that Ludwig Wittgenstein taught. Along with fellow student Alice Ambrose she secretly (since he did not allow this) made notes during Wittgenstein's lectures, which were later published. They later convinced Wittgenstein to allow them continue to write his lectures down.

== Career ==
From 1937 to 1941, MacDonald taught philosophy at St Hilda's College, Oxford, where she was also librarian. During the war she was temporary principal in the Board of Trade. This was followed by a lectureship at Bedford College, London. At this time, she was one of a very small number of women teaching philosophy outside of Oxford University. From 1947 she was also a lecturer on Ethics to staff at the Home Office. She became reader in philosophy at Bedford College in 1955.

MacDonald's early articles were criticisms of the work of contemporary philosophers. Later she concentrated on aesthetics, particularly on how language relates to art. She was also interested in political philosophy and published a significant article "Natural Rights", in which she argues against the idea that natural rights are founded on natural law. Her view is summarised by Jonathan Wolff as: "statements of natural rights are akin to decisions, declaring 'here I stand', and [she] ... uses an analogy with another area of critical judgement — in her case, literary appreciation — to point out the possibility of rational argument through the presentation of reasons".

Her work attracted substantial attention at the time. Two of her articles were reprinted in the series Logic and Language (1951), which included articles that were representative of current philosophical trends. Having studied with Wittgenstein before coming to Oxford in 1937, she deployed and developed Wittgensteinian themes in her own subsequent work. It has been argued that this work was an important source of ideas in her close friend Gilbert Ryle's philosophy. Cheryl Misak and Michael Kremer both argue that the distinction between knowledge-how and knowledge-that popularized by Ryle in The Concept of Mind (1949) was brought to his attention by MacDonald.

Mark Addis reports that, in 1933, MacDonald "helped to found" the philosophy journal Analysis "in collaboration with" Stebbing, C.A. Mace and Ryle. She was also the journal's editor from 1948 until 1956.

She died in London in 1956, following heart surgery.

== Publications ==
- Margaret MacDonald (1933). "Verification and Understanding". Proceedings of the Aristotelian Society 34:143 - 156.
- Margaret Macdonald (1936). "Russell and McTaggart". Philosophy 11 (43):322 - 335.
- Margaret Macdonald (1936). "Language and Reference". Analysis, 4 (2/3), 33–41
- Margaret MacDonald, Gilbert Ryle and I. Berlin (1937). "Symposium: Induction and Hypothesis". Aristotelian Society Supplementary Volume 16:20 - 102.
- Margaret MacDonald (1937). "Reply to Mr. MacIver". Analysis 4 (5):77 - 80.
- Margaret MacDonald (1937). "Further Reply to Mr. MacIver". Analysis 5 (1):12 - 16.
- Margaret MacDonald (1937). "The Philosopher's Use of Analogy". Proceedings of the Aristotelian Society, 38 (1937-1938): 291–312., reprinted in Gilbert Ryle and Antony Flew, ed, Logic and Language (First Series): Essays. Blackwell. (1951)
- Margaret MacDonald (1938). "Things and Processes". Analysis 6 (1):1 - 10. Reprinted in Philosophy and Analysis (1954)
- Margaret MacDonald (1940). "Necessary Propositions". Analysis 7 (2):45 - 51.
- Margaret MacDonald (1940). "The Language of Political Theory". Proceedings of the Aristotelian Society, (41): 91–112. reprinted in: Methods in Ethics: Virtual Issue No. 3, Proceedings of the Aristotelian Society (2015) and; Gilbert Ryle and Antony Flew, ed., Logic and Language (First Series): Essays. Blackwell. (1951)
- Margaret MacDonald (1946). "Natural Rights". Proceedings of the Aristotelian Society 47:225 - 250.
- A. H. Hannay, John Holloway and Margaret MacDonald (1949), "Symposium: What Are the Distinctive Features of Arguments Used in Criticism of the Arts?", Proceedings of the Aristotelian Society, Supplementary Volume (23): 165–94; MacDonald's contribution reprinted in William Elton, ed., Aesthetics and Language. (1954)
- Margaret MacDonald (1950). "Ethics and the Ceremonial Use of Language", in Max Black (ed.), Philosophical Analysis: A Collection of Essays (1950), pp. 211–29.
- Margaret MacDonald (1951). "Professor Ryle on the Concept of Mind". Philosophical Review 60 (January):80-90.
- Margaret MacDonald (1952). "Art and Imagination". Proceedings of the Aristotelian Society 53:205 - 226.
- Margaret MacDonald (1953). "Sleeping and Waking". Mind 62 (April):202-215.
- Margaret MacDonald (1953). "Linguistic Philosophy and Perception". Philosophy 28 (October):311-324.
- Margaret MacDonald and M. Scriven (1954). "Symposium: The Language of Fiction". Aristotelian Society Supplementary Volume 28:165 - 196; MacDonald's contribution reprinted in Margolis, Joseph (ed.). Philosophy Looks at the Arts: Contemporary Readings in Aesthetics (1962)
- Margaret MacDonald (ed.) (1954/1966). Philosophy and Analysis. Oxford, B. Blackwell.
