= John Alexander Stewart =

John Alexander Stewart may refer to:

- John Alexander Stewart (politician) (1867–1922), Canadian politician
- John Alexander Stewart (scholar) (1882–1948), classical scholar, colonial public servant and professor of Burmese
- John Alexander Stewart (philosopher) (1846–1933), Scottish writer, educator and philosopher

== See also ==
- John Stewart (disambiguation)
