= Wernham =

Wernham is an English surname. It may refer to:

- Archibald Garden Wernham, Scottish philosopher
- Charlie Wernham, English actor
- Herbert Fuller Wernham, British botanist
- R. B. Wernham, English historian
