= Daniel Connor (disambiguation) =

Daniel Connor (1831–1898) was an Irish convict transported to Western Australia in the 19th century.

Daniel or Dan Connor may also refer to:

- Dan Connor (American football) (born 1985), 2007 Chuck Bednarik Award winner
- Dan Connor (footballer) (born 1981), Irish football goalkeeper who played for Hereford United

== See also ==
- Dan Conner, a character in the American sitcom Roseanne and its spin-off, The Conners
- Dan Conners (1942–2019), American football player
- Daniel Connors (born 1988), Australian rules footballer who currently plays with the Richmond Football Club
- Daniel O'Connor (disambiguation)
