= Edward Fulham =

English professor and cleric (died 1694)

Edward Fulham D.D. (died 9 December 1694) was White's Professor of Moral Philosophy, Oxford University from 1633 and a Canon of Windsor from 1660 to 1694

== Career ==
He was educated at Christ Church, Oxford and graduated BA in 1628, MA in 1631, BD in 1643 and DD in 1660.

He was appointed:

- Professor of Moral Philosophy, Oxford University 1633
- Rector of Wootton, Oxfordshire 1638
- Chaplain to the British Factory in Livorno (during the English Civil War)
- Prebendary of Ibthorne in Chichester Cathedral 1641 - 1682
- Vicar of Bray, 1660
- Rector of West Ilsley, Berkshire 1662
- Prebendary of Lichfield 1673
- Chaplain to King Charles II

He was appointed to the second stall in St George's Chapel, Windsor Castle in 1666, and held the stall until 1694.
