= Adam Morton =

Canadian philosopher (1945–2020)

Adam Morton FRSC
- Born: John Adam Garibian; May 1945; London, England
- Died: October 22, 2020 (aged 75); Vancouver, British Columbia, Canada
- Other name: John Adam Morton
- Citizenship: British; Canadian

Academic background
- Education: McGill University; Princeton University

Academic work
- Discipline: Philosophy
- Sub-discipline: Epistemology; philosophy of mathematics; philosophy of mind
- Institutions: Princeton University; University of Ottawa; University of Bristol; University of Oklahoma; University of Alberta; University of British Columbia
- Website: fernieroad.ca/a

Adam Morton FRSC (1945 – 2020) was a Canadian philosopher. Morton's work focused on how we understand one another's behaviour in everyday life, with an emphasis on the role mutual intelligibility plays in cooperative activity. He also wrote on ethics, decision-making, philosophy of language and epistemology. His later work concerned our vocabulary for evaluating and monitoring our thinking. Morton was Professor of Philosophy from 1980 to 2000 at the University of Bristol in the UK and finished his academic career at the University of British Columbia. He was president of the Aristotelian Society during 1998–1999 and in 2006 was elected a Fellow of the Royal Society of Canada.

== Works ==
Morton authored Frames of Mind: Constraints on the Common Sense Conception of the Mental (1980), Disasters and Dilemmas: Strategies for Real-life Decision Making (1990), The Importance of Being Understood: Folk Psychology as Ethics (2002), On Evil (2005), Bounded Thinking: Intellectual Virtues for Limited Agents (2012), Emotion and Imagination (2013), and two textbooks, A Guide Through the Theory of Knowledge (2002) and Philosophy in Practice (2003). Along with Stephen P. Stich, he co-edited Benacerraf and His Critics (1997).

Professional and academic associations
Preceded by John Cottingham	President of the Aristotelian Society; 1998–1999	Succeeded by David Wiggins
