= Bernard Mayo =

Bernard Mayo (1921 – 14 February 2000) was an English philosopher. He worked at University of Birmingham until 1968, when he joined University of St. Andrews as professor of moral philosophy, from which he retired in 1983. He was editor of Analysis (1956–65) and The Philosophical Quarterly (1973–80).

== Books ==
- Logic of personality (Jonathan Cape, 1952)
- Ethics and the moral life (Macmillan Publishers and St. Martin's Press, 1958)
- The philosophy of right and wrong (Routledge, 1986)

== Publications ==
- Rules' of Language, Philosophical Studies, vol. 2, pp. 1–11, 1951
- Ethics and Moral Controversy, The Philosophical Quarterly, Vol. 4, No. 14 (Jan., 1954), pp. 1–14
- Poetry, Language and Communication, Journal of Philosophy, Vol. 29, No. 109 (Apr., 1954), pp. 131–145
- Events and Language, in Philosophy and Analysis by Margaret MacDonald, 1954
- Professor J. J. C. Smart on temporal asymmetry, Australasian Journal of Philosophy, Volume 33, Issue 1 May 1955, pp 38–44
- The Incongruity of Counterparts, Philosophy of Science, Vol. 25, No. 2 (Apr., 1958), pp. 109–115
- Objects, Events, and Complementarity, The Philosophical Review, Vol. 70, No. 3, pp. 340–361, July 1961
- The Open Future, Mind, vol. 71, 1962, pp. 1–14
- A note on J. L. Austin's performative theory of knowledge, Philosophical Studies, vol. 14, no. 1–2, January, 1963
- The Incoherence of Determinism, Journal of Philosophy, Vol. 44, No. 168 (Apr., 1969), pp. 89–100
- On the Keith Lehrer-Richard Taylor Analysis of 'Can'-Statements, Mind, New Series, Vol. 77, No. 306 (Apr., 1968), pp. 271–278
