= Donald M. MacKinnon =

Scottish philosopher and theologian (1913–1994)

Donald M. MacKinnon FRSE FBA
- Born: Donald Mackenzie MacKinnon; 27 August 1913; Oban, Scotland
- Died: 2 March 1994 (aged 80); Aberdeen, Scotland
- Spouse: Lois Dryer (m. 1939)

Academic background
- Education: New College, Oxford

Academic work
- Discipline: Philosophy; theology
- Sub-discipline: Philosophical theology
- School or tradition: Anglo-Catholicism
- Institutions: University of Oxford; University of Aberdeen; University of Cambridge
- Doctoral students: David F. Ford
- Notable students: Philippa Foot
- Influenced: David Fergusson; Fergus Kerr; Nicholas Lash; Iris Murdoch; Rowan Williams

Donald Mackenzie MacKinnon (27 August 1913 – 2 March 1994) was a Scottish philosopher and theologian.

== Life ==
He was born in Oban on 27 August 1913, the son of Donald M. MacKinnon, Procurator Fiscal, and his wife, Grace Isabella Rhynd.

He was educated at Cargilfield Preparatory School in Edinburgh then Winchester College in Hampshire. He then studied divinity at New College, Oxford, graduating MA in 1935. From 1940 he began tutoring at the University of Oxford becoming a lecturer in philosophy in 1945. In 1947 he became Regius Professor of Moral Philosophy in the University of Aberdeen, and in 1960 became the Norris–Hulse Professor of Divinity in the University of Cambridge. He retired from full-time academia in 1978. MacKinnon delivered the Gifford Lectures in 1965 and 1966 on 'The Problem of Metaphysics'. A revised version of the lectures was published under the same name in 1974.

He wrote the foreword to a 1979 posthumous collection of essays by Cornelius Ernst, entitled Multiple Echo.

He was President of the Aristotelian Society 1976/77 and President for the Society for the Study of Theology 1981/82. In 1984 he was elected a Fellow of the Royal Society of Edinburgh. His proposers were Thomas F. Torrance, J. MacIntosh, G, Donaldson, David Daiches, G. W. Anderson, Sir Thomas Broun Smith, Ronnie Selby Wright and G. P. Henderson.

He was an Episcopalian.

He died in Aberdeen on 2 March 1994.

== Family ==
In 1939 he married Lois Dryer.

== Views ==
MacKinnon is noted for his contributions to philosophical theology. He is particularly noted for the depth of analysis he applied to intractable theological problems, not least the refusal to simplify difficult questions in order to produce tidy or conclusive answers. His insistence on truth over tidiness is evident in his method of thought, an approach which some have labelled "open-textured". The label derives from MacKinnon's use of literary, artistic, and political sources in his work – modes of enquiry which operate in contrast to the systematic and epistemologically narrow approach of some theology and philosophy.

The intensity of MacKinnon's thought was matched by his lecturing style, which was marked by "his dangerously strong charisma, his ability to terrify adversaries". Some former students admit to "spending more time mimicking him than following his arguments about Kant or Hegel." At Aberdeen he was notorious among the students for talking to the ivy on the walls of King's College. Former students Dame Iris Murdoch, Philippa Foot, and Lord Williams of Oystermouth expressed deep indebtedness and admiration for his input into their intellectual development. His influential input into important and relatively widely read thinkers' work, such as Williams and Murdoch, would suggest that MacKinnon's contribution to theology and philosophy is most strongly felt through the subsequent work of his students. By contrast, MacKinnon did not publish extensively, and that which he did publish is largely in short essay form and out of print.

=== Realism and anti-realism ===
MacKinnon often used a broadly Kantian metaphysics to determine the limits of a person's knowledge of God. (Note: See MacKinnon 1974, passim, and MacKinnon 1987, part A.) Subsequently, there is a close relationship between God and ethics in MacKinnon's work. But MacKinnon veers away from concluding that Kant collapsed God into ethics. Nor does he accept – the further conclusion that sometimes follows this – that Kant's epistemology precludes metaphysical realism, i.e. necessitates anti-realism, in ethics and theology. (Note: See Cupitt 1984, pp. 136–140, for an example of these sorts of deductions.) In The Problem of Metaphysics (1974) MacKinnon develops a Kantian epistemology and comes close to an agnostic position on God, except for the proviso that ethical decision-making has the capacity to make agents aware of a kind of metaphysical realism. He goes on to argue that it is in keeping with a Kantian metaphysics to deduce God from this sense of awareness: "Kant [is] in the end a theist. ... His God does not enter into the texture of his exposition. ... he lies altogether beyond the frontiers of intelligible referential and descriptive statement. [But] we are all the time thrust outside those frontiers, precipitated beyond them by a moral experience on whose formal unity, in the most diverse human situations, Kant insists." MacKinnon is, in this respect, against interpreters of Kant who consider his epistemology to have anti-realist conclusions. He is also quite specifically against the view that an anti-realist theology needs to be developed as renewed approach to Christian thought, e.g. the approach developed by Don Cupitt.

Tragedy, construed as an ethical construct, plays an important part in the awareness of metaphysical realism. MacKinnon illustrates this with examples of tragedy from Shakespeare, Greek thought, and Jesus' parables, and concludes that "[i]t is as if we are constrained in pondering the extremities of human life to acknowledge the transcendent as the only alternative to the kind of trivialisation which would empty of significance the sorts of [tragic] experience with which we have been concerned".

== Selected works ==
- Christian Faith and Communist Faith (edited, 1953)
- A Study in Ethical Theory (1957)
- The Resurrection: A Dialogue (1966) with Geoffrey Lampe and William Purcell
- 'Moral Objections' in Objections to Christian Belief (1967)
- Borderlands of Theology and Other Essays (1968)
- The Stripping of the Altars (1969)
- The Problem of Metaphysics (1974)
- Explorations in Theology, Volume 5 (1979)
- Themes in Theology: The Three-Fold Cord (1987)
- Philosophy and the Burden of Theological Honesty (2011)
- Kenotic Ecclesiology: Select Writings of Donald M MacKinnon (2016)

== Notes ==
Academic offices
Preceded by John Laird	Regius Professor of Moral Philosophy; 1947–1960	Succeeded by Archibald Garden Wernham
Preceded by Herbert Henry Farmer	Norris–Hulse Professor of Divinity; 1960–1978	Succeeded by Nicholas Lash
Preceded by	Gifford Lecturer at the University of Edinburgh; 1965	Succeeded by Hywel Lewis
Professional and academic associations
Preceded by Anthony Quinton	President of the Aristotelian Society; 1976–1977	Succeeded by David W. Hamlyn
Preceded by James Atkinson	President of the Society for the Study of Theology; 1981–1982	Succeeded by James A. Whyte
