= Ruth L. Saw =

British philosopher and aesthetician (1901–1986)

Ruth Lydia Saw
- Born: 1 August 1901; Carshalton, Surrey
- Died: 23 March 1986 (aged 84); Carshalton, Surrey

Education
- Education: Bedford College, University of London

Ruth Lydia Saw (1 August 1901 – 23 March 1986) was a British philosopher and aesthetician.

== Education and career ==
Ruth Saw attended the County School for Girls in Wallington, Surrey, followed in 1926 by Bedford College, University of London, where she studied under Susan Stebbing. She accepted a position as lecturer in philosophy at Smith College and remained there for several years. She then returned to England and was appointed to a Lecturership in Philosophy at Bedford College in 1939 and remained there for the rest of her career. She became Reader in Philosophy in 1946 and then Professor of Aesthetics from 1961 to 1964. She was also Head of department there from 1953 until her retirement in 1964.

Saw's philosophical interests began with logic and philosophy of language, particularly on causal induction in Ockham's work. This moved towards metaphysics, particularly Gottfried Wilhelm Leibniz and Baruch Spinoza on whom she wrote full-length works. By the 1950s her interests lay with aesthetics. She was appointed Professor of Aesthetics in the 1961 and published three articles on the subject in the early 1960s.

Saw was a founding member of the British Society of Aesthetics. In 1963 she became vice-president of the Society, and in 1968, on the death of Sir Herbert, she became president. She began to play an active role in the Aristotelian Society from the mid-1930s eventually to become the fifth woman to be elected President of the Society in 1965.

== Publications ==
- Saw, Ruth L. (1941). "William of Ockham on Terms, Propositions, Meaning". Proceedings of the Aristotelian Society 42:45 - 64.
- Saw, Ruth L. (1951). The Vindication of Metaphysics. A study in the philosophy of Spinoza. London: Macmillan.
- Saw, Ruth L. (1952). "Our knowledge of individuals". Proceedings of the Aristotelian Society 52:167-188.
- Saw, Ruth L. (1954). Leibniz. London: Penguin Books.
- Saw, Ruth L. (1954). "Way to Wisdom: an Introduction to Philosophy. By Karl Jaspers. Translated by Ralph Manheim. (London: Gollancz, 1951, pp. 208. Price 10s. 6d.)". Philosophy 29 (109):176-.
- Saw, Ruth L. (1964). "E. F. Carritt". British Journal of Aesthetics 4 (1):3-6.
- Saw, Ruth L. (1969). "Personal identity in Spinoza". Inquiry 12 (1-4):1 – 14.
- Saw, Ruth L. (1973). "Aesthetics: An Introduction". Journal of Aesthetics and Art Criticism 31 (4):543-544.
