= Paul Oppé =

British art historian, critic, art collector and museum official (1878–1952)

- Born: Adolphus Paul Oppé; 22 September 1878; London, England
- Died: 29 March 1957; London, England
- Citizenship: United Kingdom
- Education: New College, Oxford; St Andrews University
- Occupations: Art historian, art critic, journalist, art dealer
- Parent(s): Siegmund Armin Oppé (father); Pauline Jaffé (mother)

Adolph Paul Oppé, CB, FBA (22 September 1878 – 29 March 1957) was a British art historian, critic, art collector and museum official. Born in London, the son of a silk merchant, he was educated at Charterhouse, the University of St Andrews, and New College, Oxford. From 1902 to 1905 he taught Greek and ancient history at the universities of St Andrews and Edinburgh, and from 1905 to 1938 worked as a civil servant in the Board of Education. He also served (1906–07 and 1910–1913) as Deputy Director of the Victoria & Albert Museum. Oppé was elected as a Fellow of the British Academy in 1952.

Oppé was a distinguished collector of drawings, and monographs on Raphael and Botticelli, but subsequently concentrated on British art, particularly works on paper including those by William Hogarth, Alexander Cozens, John Robert Cozens, and Thomas Rowlandson, and wrote important catalogues on the English drawings in the Royal Collection at Windsor including those by Paul and Thomas Sandby. He was a pioneer instigator of English watercolour and drawing studies, along with Laurence Binyon, Charles F. Bell and other enthusiasts, and built up what Sir Charles Wheeler called "the most important [collection] own its representation of English artists to have been formed in this century".

His collection of over 3,000 works of art on paper, including figurative drawings, portraits, and landscapes produced predominately between 1750 and 1850 was regarded as being of national importance and was acquired by Tate Gallery in 1996. The acquisition consisted of over 3,000 works of art on paper, including portraits, figurative drawings, and most notably landscapes from the ‘golden age’ of British watercolour painting (1750–1850). It includes watercolours by Alexander and John Robert Cozens, John Downman and Francis Towne and oils by Thomas Jones. From the nineteenth century there are works by John Constable, John Sell Cotman, George Richmond, J. M. W. Turner and John William Inchbold.

In 1915, he catalogued a previously undocumented collection of watercolours by the artist Francis Towne that were inherited by Maria Sophia Merivale (1853–1928) and Judith Ann Merivale (1860–1945), which has formed the basis of a subsequent catalogue raisonné on the artist.

== Archive and library ==
In 2018, Oppé's library and archive collection was accepted in lieu of tax and allocated to the Paul Mellon Centre for Studies in British Art under the UK Government's Acceptance in Lieu Scheme. The archive comprises research notes, correspondence, annotated exhibition and auction catalogues, and other associated material compiled by Oppé throughout his career largely concerning eighteenth century British artists as well as an extensive set of diaries and notebooks that he maintained throughout his adult life. The material is now fully catalogued and available for consultation in the public study room at the centre.

== Selected publications ==
- Oppé, Paul (1909). Raphael. London: Methuen.
- Oppé, Paul (1919). Francis Towne, landscape painter. The Walpole Society, 8. The Walpole Society: Oxford, pp. 95–126.
- Oppé, Paul (1923). The water-colour drawings of John Sell Cotman. London: The Studio.
- Oppé, Paul (1923). Thomas Rowlandson: his drawings and water-colours. London: The Studio.
- Oppé, Paul (1925). The watercolours of Turner, Cox and De Wint. London: Phaidon Press.
- Oppé, Paul (1947). The drawings of Paul and Thomas Sandby in the collection of His Majesty the King at Windsor Castle. Oxford; London: Phaidon Press.
- Oppé, Paul (1948). The drawings of William Hogarth. London: Halton and Truscott Smith.
- Oppé, Paul (1950). English drawings, Stuart and Georgian periods, in the collection of His Majesty the King at Windsor Castle. London: Phaidon Press.
- Oppé, Paul (1952). Alexander & John Robert Cozens. London: Adam and Charles Black.
