= Shadworth Hodgson =

British philosopher (1832–1912)

Shadworth Hollway Hodgson, FBA (25 December 1832 – 13 June 1912) was an English philosopher.

== Biography ==
He worked independently, without academic affiliation. He was acknowledged by William James as a forerunner of Pragmatism, although he viewed his work as a completion of Kant's project. Hodgson was a member of a London philosophy club with James, called the "Scratch Eight". Hodgson regarded the poets William Wordsworth and Samuel Taylor Coleridge as his chief inspirations, and had no academic background, though he was a member of the Metaphysical Society.

He was the first president of the Aristotelian Society and held that post from 1880 to 1894.

His principal work was The Metaphysic of Experience (1898) which prepared the way for New Realism. He objected to the stance of empiricism in its postulating of persons and things, and insisted that neither subject nor object are warranted as initial considerations of philosophy.

He died on 13 June 1912.

Hodgson believed in what he called the principle of reflective consciousness, namely that "A thing is what it is known as, this is the principle in its objective formula; 'the objective and subjective aspects are inseparable,' this is its subjective formula, expressing the way in which the same truth appears in reflection itself.".

Attention to Hodgson was briefly enlivened by an article by Wolfe Mays in a British phenomenology journal in the 1970s.

The volumes of Hodgson's principal work were often shipped with uncut pages and visits to libraries with these volumes has revealed that sometimes most pages of all 4 volumes remained uncut even one hundred years later.
