= Philosophy (journal) =

- Discipline: Philosophy
- Language: English
- Edited by: Maria Alvarez, Bill Brewer

Publication details
- Former name(s): Journal of Philosophical Studies
- History: 1926–present
- Publisher: Cambridge University Press for the Royal Institute of Philosophy (United Kingdom)
- Frequency: Quarterly

Standard abbreviations
- ISO 4: Philosophy

Indexing
- ISSN: 0031-8191 (print); 1469-817X (web)

Links
- Journal homepage

Philosophy is the scholarly journal of the Royal Institute of Philosophy. It is designed to be intelligible to the non-specialist reader and has been in continuous publication since 1926. The journal is triple-blind reviewed and published by Cambridge University Press, and is currently edited by Maria Alvarez and Bill Brewer. The journal was established in 1926 "to build bridges between specialist philosophers and a wider educated public". Each issue contains a "New Books" section and an editorial on a topic of philosophical or public interest.

== Editorial Board ==
=== Editors ===
- 1927 - 1956 Sydney E. Hooper
- 1957 - 1972 H. B. Acton
- 1973- 1994 Renford Bamborough
- 1994 - 2019 Anthony O'Hear
- From August 2019 - Maria Alvarez and Bill Brewer

=== Associate Editors ===
- Rachel Cristy, King’s College London, UK
- Sarah Fine, King’s College London, UK
- Alex Franklin, King’s College London, UK
- Sacha Golob, King’s College London, UK
- James Stazicker, King’s College London, UK
- Raphael Woolf, King’s College London, UK

=== Reviews Editor ===
- John Callanan, King’s College London, UK
