= John Skorupski =

British philosopher (born 1946)

John Skorupski FBA (born 19 September 1946) is a British philosopher whose main interests are epistemology, ethics and moral philosophy, political philosophy, and the history of 19th and 20th century philosophy. He is best known for his work on John Stuart Mill and his study of normativity, The Domain of Reasons. His most recent publication is Being and Freedom: on Late Modern Ethics in Europe.

== Career ==
Skorupski was educated at St Benedict's School, Ealing. He studied philosophy and economics at Christ's College, Cambridge, from which he received both an MA and a PhD.

- 1971–72 Visiting Lecturer at the University of Ife, Nigeria (now Obafemi Awolowo University)
- 1974 Visiting Professor at the Katholieke Universiteit Leuven (the University of Louvain), Belgium
- 1974–76 Research Fellow at Swansea University (University of Wales, Swansea)
- 1976–84 Lecturer at the University of Glasgow
- 1984–90 Professor of Philosophy at the University of Sheffield
- 1990–present Professor of Moral Philosophy at the University of St Andrews.

Skorupski was President of the Aristotelian Society in 1990–91. He was made an Honorary Fellow of the Centre for the Study of Political Thought of the Jagiellonian University, Kraków, in 1991, and was named Fellow of the Royal Society of Edinburgh in 1992. He was elected a Fellow of the British Academy in 2023.

== Publications ==
Books

- Symbol and Theory: A Philosophical Study of Theories of Religion in Social Anthropology. Cambridge: Cambridge University Press, 1975.
- John Stuart Mill. London: Routledge, 1989.
- English-Language Philosophy 1750–1945. (OPUS History of Western Philosophy, vol. 6) Oxford: Oxford University Press, 1993.
- Virtue and Taste: Essays in Memory of Flint Schier. Edited by John Skorupski and Dudley Knowles. Oxford: Basil Blackwell, 1993.
- Cambridge Companions to Philosophy: John Stuart Mill. Edited by John Skorupski. Cambridge: Cambridge University Press, 1998.
- Ethical Explorations. Oxford: Oxford University Press, 1999.
- Why Read Mill Today? London: Routledge, 2006.
- The Domain of Reasons. Oxford: Oxford University Press, 2010.
- Being and Freedom: on Late Modern Ethics in Europe. Oxford: Oxford University Press, 2021.

Papers

- Buckpassing about goodness, In Hommage à Wlodek. Philosophical Papers Dedicated to Wlodek Rabinowicz, ed. T. Rønnow-Rasmussen, B. Petersson, J. Josefsson and D. Egonsson, 2007.
