= Anthony Manser =

British philosopher (1924–1995)

Anthony Richards Manser (1924–1995) was a British philosopher and Professor of Philosophy at Southampton University. He was a president of Aristotelian Society and a member of the Mind Association. He is known for his works on the philosophy of F. H. Bradley.

== Books ==
- The Philosophy of F. H. Bradley, Oxford University Press 1984
- Bradley's Logic, Barnes & Noble Books 1983
