= Dudley Knowles =

British philosopher

Dudley Ross Knowles (/noʊlz/; 1947, Lancashire – 26 October 2014) was a British political philosopher and professor at Glasgow University. He was widely known for his influential book Political Philosophy (2001).

== Publications ==
Books

- 2001 Political Philosophy (Routledge/McGill University Press)
- 2002 Hegel and the Philosophy of Right (Routledge)
- 2009 Political Obligation: A Critical Introduction (Routledge)

Books edited

- 1990 Explanation and its Limits (Cambridge University Press)
- 1993 (with John Skorupski), Virtue and Taste (Blackwell)
- 2009 G.W.F. Hegel (Ashgate)
