= David Bell (philosopher) =

British philosopher (born 1947)

David Andrew Bell (born 1947) is a British philosopher. He is an emeritus professor of philosophy at the University of Sheffield, He studied in Dublin (Trinity College), Göttingen (Georg August University) and Canada (McMaster University), and is best known for his work on the philosophers Gottlob Frege, Immanuel Kant, and Edmund Husserl, and also on topics such as solipsism, phenomenology, the theory of thought and judgement, and the history of the Analytic Tradition.

Bell's awards include: Radcliffe Research Fellowship (1986–87); Alexander von Humboldt Research Fellowship (1988); British Academy Research Readership (1993); and the Alexander von Humboldt Prize in Philosophy (1995). He has held the posts of Visiting Professor, Institute of Philosophy, University of Leuven, (1987); Honorary Professor, University of Keele (1993–96); and Visiting Professor, LMU Munich (1994) He was a Fellow of the Wissenschaftskolleg zu Berlin [Institute of Advanced Study] (1995–96). And in 2001-2 he was President of the Mind Association.

Bell has been influential in seeking to integrate the Analytic (predominantly anglophone) and the Continental (mainly French and German) traditions in philosophy. In 1993, together with Mark Sacks, he was instrumental in founding a new journal, The European Journal of Philosophy with the aim of proving 'a platform to which those both inside and outside Europe can turn to find some of the diversity ... in European philosophy', and thus overcome the insularity and at times hostility that has characterized aspects of that philosophy during the last century. In 2015 the EJP was voted among the top 20 philosophy journals world-wide. In 1999 Bell published an influential study of Husserl, in which analytic techniques were applied to a central figure of continental phenomenology.

== Selected publications by topic ==
=== Gottlob Frege ===
Frege's Theory of Judgement, Oxford University Press, 1979.

'How "Russellian" was Frege?', Mind, vol 99 (1990), pp. 267–277.

'Reference and sense: An Epitome', Philosophical Quarterly, vol 34 (1984), pp. 369–372.

'The Place of the Grundlagen in Frege's Development', Philosophical Quarterly, vol 31 (1981), pp. 209–224.

=== Immanuel Kant ===
'The Art of Judgement', Mind, vol 96 (1987), pp. 221–244.

'Kant', Blackwell Companion to Philosophy, Basil Blackwell, 2002, pp. 725–740.

'Some Kantian Thoughts on Propositional Unity', Aristotelian Society Supplementary Volume, vol 75 (2001), pp. 1–16.

'Transcendental Arguments and Non-naturalist Anti-realism', in (ed) R. Stern, Transcendental Arguments, Oxford University Press, 1999.

=== Husserl and phenomenology ===
Husserl, Routledge (Arguments of the Philosophers Series), 1999.

'Phenomenology, Solipsism and Egocentric Thought', Aristotelian Society Supplementary Volume, vol 62 (1988), pp. 45–60.

'Reference, Experience and Intentionality', in (ed) L. Haaparanta, Mind, Meaning and Mathematics, Springer Verlag, 2012, pp. 185–209.

=== Solipsism ===
'Solipsism and Subjectivity', European Journal of Philosophy, vol 4 (1996), pp 155–174.

'The Solipsism Debates', in (ed) T. Baldwin, The Cambridge History of Philosophy 1870–1945, Cambridge University Press, 2003, pp. 544–553.

'Solipsismus, Subjektivität, und öffentlich Welt' [Solipsism, Subjectivity, and the Objective World], in (eds) D. Bell and W. Vossenkuhl, Wissenschaft und Subjektivität [Science and Subjectivity], Akademie Verlag, Berlin, 1992.

=== History of the Analytic tradition ===
The Analytic Tradition: Meaning, Thought and Knowledge, (eds) D. Bell and N. Cooper, Basil Blackwell, 1990.

'The Revolution of Moore and Russell. A Very British Coup?', in (ed) A. O'Hear, German Philosophy since Kant, Cambridge University Press, 1999, pp. 193–208.

Wissenschaft und Subjektivität. Der Wiener Kreis und die Philosophie des 20. Jahrhunderts [Science and Subjectivity. The Vienna Circle and the Philosophy of the 20th Century], (eds) D. Bell and W. Vossenkuhl, Akademie, Berlin, 1992.

=== Theory of judgement and thought ===
'The Art of Judgement', Mind, vol 96 (1987), pp. 221–244.

'Thoughts', Notre Dame Journal of Formal Logic, vol 28 (1987), pp. 36–50.

Frege's Theory of Judgement, Oxford University Press, 1979.

'The Formation of Concepts and the Structure of Thoughts', Philosophy and Phenomenological Research, vol 56 (1996), pp. 583–596.
