= Rebecca Roache =

British philosopher

Education
- Education: University of Cambridge
- Doctoral advisor: Jane Heal; D. H. Mellor

Philosophical work
- Era: Contemporary philosophy
- Region: Western philosophy
- School: Analytic
- Institutions: Royal Holloway University of London
- Main interests: Philosophy of language
- Notable ideas: Theory of swearing

Rebecca Roache is a British philosopher and senior lecturer at Royal Holloway, University of London, known for her work on the philosophy of language, practical ethics, and philosophy of mind. She is particularly noted for her work on swearing, which has featured in various media, such as the BBC.

== Biography ==
Roache received her Bachelor of Philosophy at the University of Leeds in 1996 and her MPhil at the same university in 1997, where she worked, among others, with Robin Le Poidevin. She then took another MPhil (1999) and a PhD (2002) at St John's College, Cambridge, with Jane Heal and D. H. Mellor as dissertation advisers. She subsequently worked in various projects at the University of Oxford, including a research fellowship at the Future of Humanity Institute. She is a senior lecturer at Royal Holloway, University of London. From 2013 to 2018, she was an associate editor for the Journal of Medical Ethics.

== Notable philosophical views ==
Roache's theory of swearing examines why swearwords (including non-slurs and non-religious swearwords) are so powerful. She proposes that swearwords have a unique linguistic role, coupled to a unique emotional role. According to Roache, swearing obtains its power from speaker inferences: when someone swears, they know their audience will find it offensive, and they know the audience knows the swearer knows that the audience will find it offensive, and so on, a process termed "offence escalation". Speakers and listeners who belong to the same cultural and linguistic community will likely find similar things offensive, which explains why some expressions (disrespecting social hierarchy, sexual taboos, mention of bodily fluids, etc.) tend to cross-culturally recur as swearwords.

Roache is also noted for a blog post where she said she unfriended people who voted for the Conservatives in the 2015 general election. She argued that "Openly supporting a political party "that — in the name of austerity — withdraws support from the poor, the sick, the foreign, and the unemployed while rewarding those in society who are least in need of reward" was "as objectionable as expressing racist, sexist, or homophobic views".

In addition to her work in the philosophy of language, Roache has published on a variety of topics in practical ethics and metaphysics, such as which biomedical modifications to humans could be used to fight climate change.

== Selected publications ==
- Roache, R. 1999: "Mellor and Dennett on the perception of temporal order", The Philosophical Quarterly 49: 231–38.
- Bostrom, N. and Roache, R. 2007: "Ethical issues in human enhancement", in J. Ryberg, T. Petersen, and C. Wolf (eds.) New Waves in Applied Ethics (Basingstoke: Palgrave Macmillan): 120–52.
- Roache, R. 2009: "Bilking the bilking argument", Analysis 69/4: 605–11.
- Liao, S.M., Sandberg, A. and Roache, R. 2012: "Human engineering and climate change", Ethics, Policy & Environment 15/2: 206–21.
- Roache, R. 2014: "Can brain scans prove criminals unaccountable?", AJOB Neuroscience 5/2: 35–37.
- Roache, R. 2016: "Infertility and non-traditional families", Journal of Medical Ethics 42/9: 557–58.
- Roache, R. 2017: "Is it better to die than to be lonely?" Journal of Medical Ethics 43/9: 575–76.
- Roache, R. 2023: For F*ck's Sake: Why Swearing Is Shocking, Rude, & Fun EAN/UPC: 9780190665067
