= H. Wildon Carr =

British philosopher (1857-1931)

- Born: 16 January 1857
- Died: 8 July 1931 (aged 74); Los Angeles
- Occupation: Philosopher

Herbert Wildon Carr (16 January 1857 – 8 July 1931) was a British philosopher. He was known for reconciling Leibnizian Monadology with Bergsonian vitalism.

== Life ==
Carr was Professor of Philosophy, King's College London from 1918 to 1925, and visiting professor at the University of Southern California from 1925 until his death.

He was Honorary Secretary of the Aristotelian Society for many years and President during 1916-1918. He was the editor of Proceedings of the Aristotelian Society until 1929.

Carr translated Henri Bergson's book Mind Energy, published in 1920. He died on 8 July 1931 in Los Angeles, aged 74.

== Philosophy ==
Carr was an advocate of Bergsonian vitalism which he combined with a monadistic idealism. In a symposium of the Aristotelian Society he authored The Idealistic Interpretation of Einstein's Theory (1921–1922) which declared that the theory of relativity was in "complete accord" with idealistic philosophy, not realism. Carr stated that "while my theory of knowledge is idealistic and even solipsistic, my theory of existence is vitalistic". He defined creative evolution as "an idealistic principle applied to positive science". He argued that materialistic and mechanistic principles fail to explain the intelligence of organisms. He has been described as a pantheist.

== Selected publications ==
- Henri Bergson: The Philosophy of Change, London: Jack, 1911
- The Problem of Truth, New York: Dodge, 1913
- The Philosophy of Benedetto Croce, London: Macmillan, 1917
- The General Principle of Relativity in Its Philosophical and Historical Aspect, London: Macmillan, 1922
- L'Énergie spirituelle, Translated by H. Wildon Carr as Mind-Energy: Lectures and Essays, London: Macmillan, 1920
- A Theory of Monads: Outlines of the Philosophy of the Principle of Relativity, London: Macmillan, 1922
- Scientific Approach to Philosophy: Selected Essays and Reviews, London: Macmillan, 1924
- Changing Backgrounds in Religion and Ethics: A Metaphysical Meditation, New York: Macmillan, 1927
- The Unique Status of Man, in, American Journal of Sociology, 1928
- The Freewill Problem, London: Benn Ltd., 1928
- Leibniz, Boston: Little Brown, 1929
