= David Wiggins =

English philosopher (born 1933)

David Wiggins FBA
- Born: 8 March 1933 (age 93); London, England

Education
- Education: Brasenose College, Oxford
- Academic advisor: J. L. Ackrill

Philosophical work
- Era: Contemporary philosophy
- Region: Western philosophy
- School: Analytic philosophy; Neo-Aristotelianism
- Institutions: New College, Oxford; Bedford College, London; University College, Oxford; Birkbeck College, London
- Notable students: See list: John Broome; J. A. Harris; John McDowell; Cheryl Misak; Jonathan Westphal
- Main interests: Logic; metaphysics; moral philosophy; meta-ethics
- Notable ideas: Conceptualist realism Dummy sortals (count nouns lacking criteria of identity)

David Wiggins (born 1933) is an English moral philosopher, metaphysician, and philosophical logician working especially on identity and issues in meta-ethics.

== Biography ==
David Wiggins was born on 8 March 1933 in London, the son of Norman and Diana Wiggins (née Priestley). He attended St Paul's School before reading philosophy at Brasenose College, Oxford, where he obtained a first-class degree. His tutor was J. L. Ackrill.

After completing his National Service, he joined the Civil Service and was appointed Assistant Principal in the Colonial Office, 1957–8. He left the Civil Service and was Jane Eliza Proctor Visiting Fellow at Princeton University in 1958–9. Returning to Oxford, he was Lecturer, 1959, then Fellow and Lecturer, 1960–7, at New College. After that, he was Chair of Philosophy at Bedford College, London, 1967–80; Fellow and Praelector in Philosophy at University College, Oxford, 1981–9; and Professor of Philosophy at Birkbeck College, University of London, 1989–94; and Wykeham Professor of Logic and Fellow of New College, Oxford, 1994–2000.

Wiggins was made a fellow of the British Academy in 1978. He was also President of the Aristotelian Society from 1999 to 2000. He was elected a foreign honorary member of the American Academy of Arts and Sciences in 1992.

== Philosophical work ==
Wiggins is well known for his work in metaphysics, particularly identity. In his Sameness and Substance (Oxford, 1980), he proposed conceptualist realism, a position according to which our conceptual framework maps reality. According to philosopher Harold Noonan:

The most influential part of Wiggins's work has been in metaphysics, where he has developed a fundamentally Aristotelian conception of substance, enriched by insights drawn from Putnam (1975) and Kripke (1980). His works also contain influential discussions of the problem of personal identity, which Wiggins elucidates via a conception that he calls the "Animal Attribute View."

He has also made an influential contribution to ethics. His 2006 book, Ethics. Twelve Lectures on the Philosophy of Morality defends a position he calls "moral objectivism".

He has written widely on other areas including philosophy of language, epistemology, aesthetics and political philosophy.

A Festschrift, Essays for David Wiggins was published in 1996.

== Selected writings ==
=== Books ===
- Identity and Spatio-Temporal Continuity (Oxford, 1967)
- Truth, Invention, and the Meaning of Life (Proceedings of the British Academy, 1976)
- Sameness and Substance (Harvard, 1980)
- Needs, Values, Truth (1987, 3rd ed., 1998, rev. 2002)
- Sameness and Substance Renewed (Cambridge, 2001)
- Ethics. Twelve Lectures on the Philosophy of Morality (Harvard, 2006)
- Solidarity and the Root of the Ethical (2008)
- Continuants. Their Activity, Their Being, and Their Identity (Oxford, 2016)

=== Articles ===
- "On Being in the Same Place at the same time", Philosophical Review, vol. 77 (1968), pp. 90–95.
- "On Sentence-sense, Word-sense and Difference of Word-sense: Towards a Philosophical Theory of Dictionaries" (1971) (link)
- "Towards a reasonable libertarianism" (Essays on Freedom of Action, Routledge & Kegan Paul, 1973)
- "Weakness of Will Commensurability, and the Objects of Deliberation and Desire" (Proceedings of the Aristotelian Society, 1978)
- "A Sensible Subjectivism?" (Needs, Values, Truth: Essays in the Philosophy of Value, New York: Oxford University Press, 1987, 185–214)

Academic offices
Preceded by Michael Dummett	Wykeham Professor of Logic; 1993–2000	Succeeded by Timothy Williamson
Professional and academic associations
Preceded by Adam Morton	President of the Aristotelian Society; 1999–2000	Succeeded by James Griffin
