= Martha Kneale =

British philosopher (1909–2001)

Martha Kneale (1909 – 2001)

Martha Kneale (née Hurst; 14 August 1909 – 2 December 2001) was a British philosopher.

== Education and career ==
Martha Hurst was born in Skipton, Yorkshire. She obtained her B.A. degree from Somerville College, Oxford in 1933. Martha was a tutor and Fellow in philosophy at Lady Margaret Hall, Oxford from 1936 to 1966.

Martha married William Kneale in 1938; they had two children, George (born 1942) and Jane (married name Heal; born 1946). She was one of the first women fellows at Oxford University to maintain a fellowship after marriage.

Kneale is best known for a 1962 book that she co-wrote with her husband, William, The Development of Logic. She wrote the chapters on ancient Greek logic. The "History" is commonly referred to in the academic world simply as "Kneale and Kneale". It was the only major history of logic available in English in the mid-twentieth century, and the first major history of logic in English since The Development of Symbolic Logic published in 1906 by A. T. Shearman. The treatise has been a standard work in the history of logic for decades. Kneale published five papers between 1934 and 1950. The one on metaphysical and logical necessity, from 1938, considers the metaphysics of time and offers an explanation of ‘the necessity of the past’.

She also worked on early modern philosophy, particularly Leibniz and Spinoza and the metaphysical implications of their thought. She was also interested in parapsychology, writing a number of papers on this topic.

She was president of the Aristotelian Society from 1971 to 1972.

== Publications ==
- Hurst, Martha (1934). Can the Law of Contradiction be Stated without Reference to Time? Journal of Philosophy 31(19): 518–525. doi:10.2307/2016315. JSTOR 2016315.
- Hurst, Martha (1935). Implication in the Fourth Century B.C. Mind 44(176): 484–495. doi:10.1093/mind/XLIV.176.484. JSTOR 2249912.
- Kneale, Martha (1938). Logical and Metaphysical Necessity. Proceedings of the Aristotelian Society 38:253–268. JSTOR 4544309.
- Kneale, Martha (1950). What is the Mind-Body Problem? Proceedings of the Aristotelian Society 50:105–122. JSTOR 4544467.
- Kneale, Martha (1950). Is psychical research relevant to philosophy? Proceedings of the Aristotelian Society, suppl. vol 24:173–188.
- Kneale, Martha (1954). Review of Hayek, F. A. (1952) The Sensory Order (U of Chicago Press), in Philosophical Quarterly 4 (15):189.
- Kneale, William & Kneale, Martha (1962). The Development of Logic. Oxford: Clarendon Press.
- Kneale, Martha (1962). Review of De Rijk, L.M.(1962) Logica Modernorum Vol I (Assen, van Gorcum & Comp. N.V.), in Archiv für Geschichte der Philosophie 46: 125–27.
- Kneale, Martha (1966). Review of Bird, O. (1964) Syllogistic and its Extension (Prentice Hall), in Foundations of Language 2: 400–401.
- Kneale, Martha (1967). Review of Rescher, Nicholas (1967) The Philosophy of Leibniz (Prentice Hall), in Philosophical Quarterly 17 (69):359.
- Kneale, Martha (1968). Review of Sullivan, Mark W. (1967) Apuleian Logic (Amsterdam: Noord Hollandsche U. M.), in Philosophical Quarterly 18: 266–67.
- Kneale, Martha (1968). Eternity and Sempiternity. Proceedings of the Aristotelian Society 69, new series, 223–238. JSTOR 4544777.
- Kneale, Martha (1969). Dreaming: Martha Kneale. Royal Institute of Philosophy Supplement 3:236–248.
- Kneale, William & Kneale, Martha (1970. Propositions and Time. In Ambrose A. and Lazerowitz M. (eds.), G.E. Moore: Essays in Retrospect, Allen and Unwin.
- Kneale, Martha (1971). Review of Pike, N. (1970) God and Timelessness (Routledge and Kegan Paul), in Philosophy 46: 178–79.
- Kneale, Martha (1971). Our Knowledge of the Past and of the Future. Proceedings of the Aristotelian Society 72:1–12.
- Kneale, William & Kneale, Martha (1972). Prosleptic propositions and arguments. In Richard Walzer, S. M. Stern, Albert Habib Hourani & Vivian Brown (eds.), Islamic Philosophy and the Classical Tradition (Bruno Cassirer) 189–207.
- Kneale, Martha: 1972, 'Leibniz and Spinoza on Activity', in H.G. Frankfurt (ed.), Leibniz; A Collection of Critical Essays, (University of Notre Dame Press), 215–237.
- Kneale, Martha (1973). Review of Hintikka, Jaakko (1973) Time and Necessity: Studies in Aristotle's Theory of Modality (Oxford: Clarendon Press), in Philosophical Quarterly 24 (97):369.
- Kneale, Martha (1978). Review of McCrae, Robert (1976) Leibniz: Perception, Apperception and Thought (University of Toronto Press), in Mind 87: 133–35.
- Kneale, Martha (1979). Review of Repici, Luciana (1977) La Logica di Teofrasto (Bologna, Il Mulino), in The Classical Review New Series 19: 166–67.
- Kneale, Martha (1996). Introduction to H.H. Price (1996) Collected Works (Thoemmes Continuum).
