= Sekyra and White's Professorship of Moral Philosophy =

The White's Chair of Moral Philosophy was endowed in 1621 by Thomas White (c. 1550–1624), Canon of Christ Church as the oldest professorial post in philosophy at the University of Oxford.

In 2021, the chair was renamed the Sekyra and White’s Professorship of Moral Philosophy following a gift from the Sekyra Foundation.

Under the original agreement, the professorship was to receive a stipend of £100 per annum, along with other payments and emoluments. The chair was not to be held for more than five years, or at the most ten years. In 1673, a practice began of electing one of the proctors, usually the senior, to the office; in course of time the lectures were entirely dropped; and at length the Professorship was so far forgotten, that it was never mentioned in the Oxford Calendar before the year 1831, the practice having continued, with one exception, until February 1829.

The professorship was established on a new footing by a statute approved by the Queen in Council in 1858. As a result of statutes made by the Commissioners of 1877, the professorship is now attached with a fellowship with Corpus Christi College.

The Sekyra and White’s Professor of Moral Philosophy leads the study and development of moral philosophy within Oxford and supervises doctoral and Master’s students in the subject. The postholder also chairs the Oxford Moral Philosophy Seminar, which has hosted the world’s leading moral philosophers in recent decades. Previous holders of the Chair have contributed to debates around the biggest challenges facing humanity.

== Holders of the White's Professorship of Moral Philosophy ==
- 1621 William Price, MA, Student of Christ Church
- 1630 Thomas Ballow, MA, Student of Christ Church
- 1634 Edward Fulham, MA, Student of Christ Church
- 1638 George Gisbey, MA, Fellow of St. John’s College
- 1643 John Berkenhead, MA, Fellow of All Souls College
- 1648 Edward Copley, MA, Fellow of Merton College
- 1649 Henry Wilkinson, BD, Principal of Magdalen Hall
- 1654 Francis Howell, MA, Fellow of Exeter College; afterwards Principal of Jesus College
- 1657 William Carpender, MA, Student of Christ Church
- 1660 Francis Palmer, MA, Student of Christ Church
- 1664 Andrew Crispe, MA, Fellow of Christ Church
- 1668 Nathaniel Hodges, MA, Student of Christ Church
- 1673 Abraham Campion, MA, Fellow and Senior Proctor of Trinity College

...

- 1708 Edward Thwaytes, MA, Fellow of The Queen's College; Regius Professor of Greek

...

- 1829 William Mills, BD, Fellow of Magdalen College
- 1834 Renn Dickson Hampden, DD, Principal of St. Mary Hall; afterwards Regius Professor of Divinity, Bishop of Hereford
- 1836 William Sewell, MA, Fellow of Exeter College
- 1841 Charles William Stocker, DD, sometimes Fellow of St. John’s College
- 1842 George Henry Sacheverell Johnson, MA, Fellow of The Queen's College, Savilian Professor of Astronomy
- 1845 Henry George Liddell, MA, Student, afterwards Dean, of Christ Church
- 1846 John Matthias Wilson, MA, Fellow, afterwards President, of Corpus Christi College
- 1851 John Matthias Wilson, re-elected
- 1856–1858 Vacant
- 1858 John Matthias Wilson, re-elected
- 1874 John Richard Turner Eaton (1825–?), MA, sometimes Fellow of Merton College
- 1878 Thomas Hill (T.H.) Green (1836–1882), MA, Fellow of Balliol College
- 1882 William Wallace (1843–1897), MA, Student of Balliol College; Fellow of Merton College
- 1897 John Alexander Stewart (1846–1933), MA, Student of Christ Church
- 1923 William David (W. D.) Ross (1877–1971), MA, Fellow of Oriel College
- 1928 Harold Arthur (H. A.) Prichard (1871–1947), MA, Scholar at New College; Fellow at Hertford College, Trinity College, and Corpus Christi College
- 1937 Herbert James Paton (1887–1969), MA (Glasgow), MA, Snell Exhibitioner at Balliol College; Fellow of Corpus Christi College
- 1952 John Langshaw (J. L.) Austin (1911–1960), MA, Fellow of All Souls College and Magdalen College
- 1960 William Calvert Kneale (1906–1990), MA, Fellow of Exeter College
- 1966 Richard Mervyn (R. M.) Hare (1919–2002), MA, Student and Fellow of Balliol College; Fellow of Corpus Christi College
- 1983–90 Vacant
- 1990 Bernard Arthur Owen Williams (1929–2003), MA, Fellow of Corpus Christi College
- 1996 James Griffin (1933–2019), BA (Yale), MA, DPhil, Fellow of Keble College and Corpus Christi College
- 2001 John Broome (1947–), BA (Cambridge), PhD (MIT), Fellow of Corpus Christi College
- 2014 Jeff McMahan (1954–), BA (Sewanee: University of the South), BA, MA (Oxford), PhD (Cambridge), Fellow of Corpus Christi College
- 2025 David Owens, BA (Cambridge), BPhil, DPhil (Oxford), Fellow of Corpus Christi College

== See also ==
- Wilde Professor of Mental Philosophy
- Waynflete Professor of Metaphysical Philosophy
- Wykeham Professor of Logic
