= Regius Professor of Moral Philosophy =

The Regius Professorship of Moral Philosophy is a Regius Chair at the University of Aberdeen. It was created in the 16th century, in the early years of the university's existence.

== List of Regius Professors ==
- 1760–1797: James Beattie
- 1820–1821: John Lee
- 1894–1900: William Ritchie Sorley
- 1900–1902: Robert Latta
- 1902–1924: James Black Baillie
- 1924–1946: John Laird
- 1947–1960: Donald M. MacKinnon
- 1960–1981: Archibald Garden Wernham
- 1996–2006: L. Gordon Graham
- 2009–2012: Catherine Wilson
