= John Broome (philosopher) =

British philosopher and economist (born 1947)

- Born: 17 May 1947 (age 79); Kuala Lumpur, Malayan Union

Education
- Education: Trinity Hall, Cambridge (BA); Massachusetts Institute of Technology (PhD); Bedford College, London (MA)
- Doctoral advisor: Duncan K. Foley
- Other advisors: Anthony Savile; David Wiggins

Philosophical work
- Era: Contemporary philosophy
- Region: Western philosophy
- School: Analytic philosophy
- Institutions: Birkbeck College, London; University of Bristol; University of St Andrews; Corpus Christi College, Oxford; Stanford University; Australian National University
- Doctoral students: William MacAskill; Toby Ord
- Main interests: Economics, normatively, ethics
- Notable ideas: Ethics of climate change

John Broome (born 17 May 1947) is a British philosopher and economist. He is emeritus White's Professor of Moral Philosophy at the University of Oxford and an emeritus Fellow of Corpus Christi College, Oxford.

== Biography ==
Broome was educated at Trinity Hall, Cambridge, graduating from the University of Cambridge in 1968 in Mathematics and Economics. He also studied at the University of London and at the Massachusetts Institute of Technology, where he received a PhD in economics. After being invited to study there by David Wiggins and receiving an MA in Philosophy at Bedford College, London Broome became an economics professor and taught at Birbeck College in London and later Bristol.

Before arriving at Oxford in 2000, he was Professor of Philosophy at the University of St. Andrews and, prior to that, Professor of Economics and Philosophy at the University of Bristol. At University of Bristol he served as a reader of economics and was later given a promotion to Professor of Philosophy and Economics. After leaving Oxford in 2014, he took a visiting professor position at Stanford University. He has also held visiting posts at the University of Virginia, the Australian National University, Princeton University, the University of Washington, the University of British Columbia, the Swedish Collegium for Advanced Study, and the University of Canterbury. In 2007, Broome was elected a Foreign Member of the Royal Swedish Academy of Sciences. In 2013, Broome received an honorary doctoral degree from the Faculty of Humanities at Lund University. In 2014, Broome was elected an International Honorary Member of The American Academy of Arts and Sciences for his contributions to the fields of philosophy and economics. He was made an honorary fellow of Trinity Hall, Cambridge, in 2015.

His book Weighing Goods (1991) explores the way in which goods "located" in each of the three "dimensions" — time, people, states of nature—make up overall goodness. Broome argues that these dimensions are linked by what he calls the interpersonal addition theorem, which supports the utilitarian principle of distribution. In his book Weighing Lives (2004), Broome rejects the presumed intuition that adding people to the population is ethically neutral. In his collection of papers, titled Ethics out of Economics (1999), he discusses topics such as value, equality, fairness, and utility.

== Selected bibliography ==
=== Books ===
- Broome, John (1983). The microeconomics of capitalism. London New York: Academic Press. ISBN 9780121357801.
- Broome, John (1992). Counting the cost of global warming : a report to the Economic and Social Research Council on research by John Broome and David Ulph. Cambridge: White Horse. ISBN 9781874267010.
- Broome, John (1995). Weighing goods: equality, uncertainty, and time. Oxford England: Basil Blackwell. ISBN 9780631199724.
- Broome, John (1999). Ethics out of economics. Cambridge New York: Cambridge University Press. ISBN 9780521644914.
- Broome, John (2006). Weighing lives. Oxford: Clarendon. ISBN 9780199297702.
- Broome, John (2012). Climate matters: ethics in a warming world. New York: W.W. Norton. ISBN 9780393063363.
- Broome, John (2013). Rationality Through Reasoning. New York: Blackwell. ISBN 9780393063363.

=== Chapters in books ===
- Broome, John (2009). "Why economics needs ethical theory". In Kanbur, Ravi; Basu, Kaushik (eds.). Arguments for a better world: essays in honor of Amartya Sen | Volume I: Ethics, welfare, and measurement. Oxford New York: Oxford University Press. pp. 7–14. ISBN 9780199239115.

== See also ==
- Derek Parfit
