= F. I. G. Rawlins =

British physicist and crystallographer

Francis Ian Gregory Rawlins CBE FRSE FSA FIP (1895–2 March 1969) was a British physicist and crystallographer. Professionally he was known as Ian Rawlins however most friends called him Fig Rawlins. He was an expert on x-ray photography and shadowgraphs.

He was Vice President of the International Institute for Conservation.

== Life ==
He was born in 1895 the son of William Donaldson Rawlins KC (1846-1920) and educated privately. He avoided service in the First World War due to illness.

From 1919 he studied physics first at the University of Edinburgh, and then at the University of Cambridge, graduating with an MSc. He then undertook postgraduate studies at Marburg University under Professor Schaefer.

In 1929 he became Supervisor of Crystallography at Fitzwilliam College, Cambridge he was promoted to Director of Natural Studies. In 1934 he became the official physicist for the National Gallery, London overseeing scientific authentication under Kenneth Clark. He rose to the position of Deputy Keeper of the Gallery.

In 1937 he was elected a Fellow of the Royal Society of Edinburgh. His proposers were Sir Edmund Taylor Whittaker, James Pickering Kendall, Charles Barkla and John Edwin MacKenzie.

In the Second World War he oversaw and advised on the relocation of the National Galleries artistic treasures to a quarry in Wales.

He died on 2 March 1969.
