= David Liggins =

Philosopher at the University of Manchester

David Liggins is a philosopher at the University of Manchester with research interests in metaphysics and philosophy of mathematics.

== Education and career ==
Liggins received his PhD in 2005 from the University of Sheffield. He then spent a year at University of Cambridge's faculty of philosophy before becoming a lecturer at the University of Manchester in 2006. In 2016, he was appointed joint editor of Analysis with Chris Daly. He served as the sole editor of the journal from 2017 to 2021 when it was announced that he would be joint editor alongside Stacie Friend and Lee Walters.
