= George Stout =

British philosopher and psychologist

George Stout FBA
- Born: George Frederick Stout; 6 January 1860; South Shields, England
- Died: 18 August 1944 (aged 84); Sydney, New South Wales, Australia
- Children: Alan Stout

Education
- Education: St John's College, Cambridge

Philosophical work
- Era: Contemporary philosophy
- Region: Western philosophy
- School: Personal idealism Analytic psychology
- Institutions: St John's College, Cambridge; University of Aberdeen; University of Oxford; University of St Andrews
- Main interests: Metaphysics, philosophy of psychology
- Notable ideas: Trope theory

George Frederick Stout (/staʊt/; 6 January 1860 – 18 August 1944), usually cited as G. F. Stout, was a leading English philosopher and psychologist. He was the father of the philosopher Alan Stout.

== Biography ==
Born in South Shields on 6 January 1860, Stout studied psychology at the University of Cambridge under James Ward. Like Ward, Stout employed a philosophical approach to psychology and opposed the theory of associationism.

It was as a fellow of St. John's College, Cambridge (1884–1896), that Stout published his first work in 1896: the two-volume Analytic Psychology, whose view of the role of activity in intellectual processes was later verified experimentally by the Swiss psychologist Jean Piaget. The work contains numerous references to Franz Brentano, Kazimierz Twardowski, Carl Stumpf, Christian von Ehrenfels, and Alexius Meinong. The term analytic psychology is Stout's translation of Brentano's term deskriptive Psychologie – descriptive psychology. (Cf. Analytic psychology in Dilthey.)

Stout was appointed to a new lectureship in comparative psychology at the University of Aberdeen in 1896, before becoming reader in mental philosophy at the University of Oxford (1898–1902), where he published his Manual of Psychology in 1899. This work formulated many principles later developed experimentally by the Gestalt school of psychology. Leaving Oxford, from 1903 to 1936, Stout served as professor of logic and metaphysics at St. Andrews, Fife, where he remained until his retirement in 1936.

Upon his retirement, Stout left for Australia to be with his son. He died in Sydney on 18 August 1944.

Over the course of his career, Stout taught a number of notable students, including G. E. Moore and Bertrand Russell at Cambridge University. In addition, from 1891 to 1920, he served as editor of Mind, a leading philosophical journal, and was president of Aristotelian Society from 1899 to 1904. In metaphysics, Stout is well known for his contribution to trope theory, specifically in the form of a 1923 paper for the Aristotelian Society. He delivered the Gifford Lectures in Edinburgh over 1919–1921, a first volume based on the same, was published as Mind and Matter in 1931. A second volume was published posthumously under the editorship of his son as God & Nature in 1952.

== Significant publications ==
- Analytic Psychology (1896)
- Manual of Psychology (1899, 3rd revised edition 1924)
- Studies in Philosophy and Psychology (1930)
- Mind & Matter (1931)
- God & Nature (1952)

== See also ==
- Gifford Lectures
