= Jane Heal =

British philosopher (born 1946)

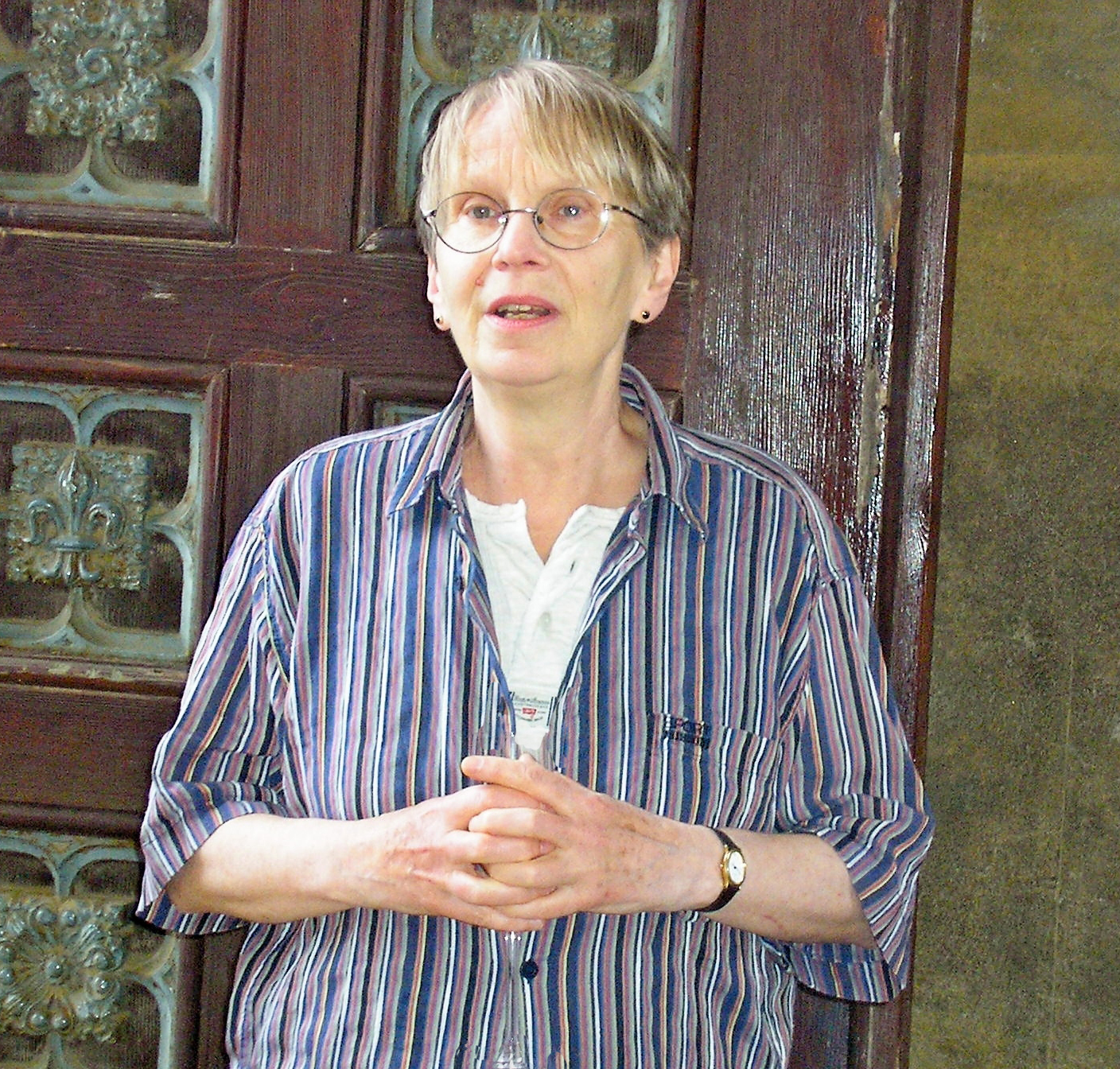
- Jane Heal in 2012
- Born: 21 October 1946 (age 79)

Education
- Education: New Hall, Cambridge

Philosophical work
- Era: Contemporary philosophy
- Region: Western philosophy
- School: Analytic
- Institutions: St John's College, Cambridge
- Doctoral students: Rebecca Roache
- Main interests: Philosophy of mind; Philosophy of language

Barbara Jane Heal (née Kneale, born 21 October 1946) is a British philosopher, and since 2012, Emeritus Professor of Philosophy at the University of Cambridge.

== Biography ==
Heal is daughter of a pair of notable Oxford philosophers William Calvert Kneale and Martha Kneale (née Hurst). She was educated at Oxford High School for Girls and New Hall, Cambridge, where she read first History before changing to Philosophy (Moral Sciences) after two years. She also took her PhD at Cambridge, working on problems in the philosophy of language. After two years of post-doctoral study in the US, at Princeton and Berkeley, she was appointed to a Lectureship at Newcastle University.

After ten years at Newcastle, she returned to the University of Cambridge as a lecturer in 1986. She was awarded her personal professorship in 1999. In the same year she became the first female President of St John's College, Cambridge serving between 1 October 1999 and 2003.

She was elected a Fellow of the British Academy in 1997. She was also President of the Aristotelian Society from 2001 to 2002.

Heal has written extensively on the philosophy of mind and language. Her work in the philosophy of mind came to be known as 'simulation' or 'co-cognition'- that our understanding of other people is achieved by, so far as we are able, placing ourselves inwardly in their situation and then allowing our thoughts and emotions to run forwards in a kind of imaginative experiment.

== Publications ==
- Fact and Meaning, 1989
- Mind, Reason and Imagination, 2003

== Sources ==
- "Heal, Prof. (Barbara) Jane," Who's Who 2012, A & C Black, 2012; online edn, Oxford University Press, Dec 2011; online edn, Nov 2011 accessed 25 Jan 2012
