= Robert Latta (philosopher) =

Scottish philosopher

Robert Latta Professor
- Born: 1865; Edinburgh
- Died: 1932 (aged 66–67)

Education
- Education: University of Edinburgh

Philosophical work
- Era: 19th-century philosophy, 20th-century philosophy
- Region: Western philosophy
- Institutions: University of St Andrews, University of Glasgow, University of Dundee, University of Aberdeen
- Main interests: Gottfried Wilhelm Leibniz

Robert Latta (1865–1932) was a Scottish philosopher known for his works on the philosophy of Gottfried Wilhelm Leibniz. He was the Regius Chair of Moral Philosophy at the University of Aberdeen.

== Life ==
Latta was born and educated in Edinburgh, and he graduated in 1886 with a first-class honours degree in MA. He continued his studies and earned a DPhil from the same university in 1897. In 1892, he became an Assistant and Lecturer in Logic and Metaphysics at the University of St Andrews, where he stayed for six years before moving to University College, Dundee to become a lecturer in Logic and Moral Philosophy. After two years, he went on to the University of Aberdeen to hold the Regius Chair of Moral Philosophy for another two years. However, his interests were not focused on moral philosophy, so he moved to the University of Glasgow in 1902 to become the Chair of Logic and Metaphysics. He taught Psychology with great enthusiasm. He retired early in 1925 due to poor health.

== Books ==
- The Monadology and Other Philosophical Writings: Leibniz; Translated With Introd. And Notes by Robert Latta (1898)
- 1899: On the Relationship between the Philosophy of Spinoza and that of Leibniz, Mind Vol. 8, pp. 333–356
- 1902: The Old Mysticism and the New Pluralism: An Inaugural Address Delivered in the University of Glasgow on October 16th, 190
- 1905: D. G. Ritchie: Philosophical Studies
- 1929: The elements of logic (with Alexander MacBeath)
