= Alan Stout (philosopher) =

Alan Stout FAHA
- Born: Alan Ker Stout; 9 May 1900; Oxford, England
- Died: 20 July 1983 (aged 83); Hobart, Tasmania, Australia
- Spouse: Evelyn Bail-Roberts
- Father: G. F. Stout

Education
- Education: Fettes College, Oriel College, Oxford

Philosophical work
- Era: 20th-century philosophy
- Region: Western philosophy
- School: Analytic philosophy
- Institutions: University College of North Wales, University of Edinburgh, University of Sydney

Alan Ker Stout (/staʊt/; 9 May 1900 – 20 July 1983) was a moral philosopher working at the University of Sydney, who also wrote on cinema. His father was G. F. Stout, British philosopher.

== Biography ==
Stout gained his MA at Oxford in 1924 and, in June of that year, he was appointed to an assistant lectureship at the University College of North Wales in Bangor, under Professor James Gibson. In this period he published three articles on Descartes and produced plays. He married Evelyn Roberts in 1927, an undergraduate leading lady in his theatre productions.

He was appointed Lecturer in Moral Philosophy at the University of Edinburgh in 1934. His mother, Isabella Ker (born in 1855), died at St Andrews in 1935. In June 1939, having applied for the position at the suggestion of Professor John Anderson, he commenced a career in the foundation Chair of Moral and Political Philosophy at the University of Sydney, Australia. He taught in Sydney until his retirement in 1965. He was the president of the New South Wales Film Council, and officer of Unesco for films.

His Sydney University appointment was meant to diminish the influence of John Anderson, a controversial atheistic philosopher whose opinions were at odds with the university and the Christian establishment of the state of New South Wales. Stout was supposed to teach the "sensitive" subjects, like moral and political philosophy, while Anderson taught logic and metaphysics. There was no genuine opposition between both philosophers though, because Stout ended up generally supporting Anderson's ideas.

From 1950 to 1967, Alan K. Stout was the editor of the Australasian Journal of Philosophy.

Stout was a foundation member of the Australian Humanities Research Council in 1956 and a foundation fellow of the Australian Academy of the Humanities in 1969.

== Major publications ==
=== Books ===
- Documentary films, Sydney, 1944
- Making films in Australia, Melbourne, Australian National Film Board, 1946.
- Abortion law reform, Sydney, 1968.

=== Articles ===
- "The Basis of Knowledge in Descartes", Mind, New Series, Vol. 38, No. 151, (Jul., 1929), pp.330–342.
- "The Basis of Knowledge in Descartes" (II), Mind, New Series, Vol. 38, No. 152, (Oct., 1929), pp.458–472.
- "Descartes' Proof of the Existence of Matter", Mind, New Series, Vol. 41, No. 162, (Apr., 1932), pp.191–207, reprinted in Descartes: a collection of critical essaysedited by Willis Doney (1967)
- "Symposium: Can Philosophy Determine What Is Ethically or Socially Valuable?", J. L. Stocks, A. K. Stout, W. D. Lamont, Proceedings of the Aristotelian Society, Supplementary Volumes, Vol. 15, What can Philosophy Determine?, (1936), pp.189–235
- "Free Will and Responsibility", Proceedings of the Aristotelian Society, 37 (1936–37), reprinted in Readings in Ethical Theory, selected and edited by Wilfrid Sellars and John Hospers, New York: Appleton-Century-Crofts, 1952.
- "But Suppose Everyone Did the Same", Australasian Journal of Philosophy 32, 1954, pp.1–29.
