= William Ritchie Sorley =

Scottish philosopher (1855-1935)

William Ritchie Sorley, FBA (/ˈsɔːrli/; 4 November 1855 – 28 July 1935), usually cited as W. R. Sorley, was a Scottish philosopher. A Gifford Lecturer, he was one of the thinkers of the British idealist school, with interests in ethics. He was opposed to women being admitted as students to the University of Cambridge.

== Life and career ==
William Ritchie Sorley was born in Selkirk, Scotland, the son of Anna Ritchie and William Sorley, a Free Church of Scotland minister. He was educated first at the University of Edinburgh, where he took a degree in philosophy and mathematics. This was followed by New College, Edinburgh where he studied theology with the intention of training for the church. He gave this up, and after winning the Shaw Fellowship he spent a year at Trinity College, Cambridge where he took Part II of the Moral Sciences Tripos. He subsequently spent several years at Cambridge where he was lecturer and in 1883 he was elected a Fellow at Trinity.

In 1886, he was appointed to a post at University College London. After two years he was appointed to a professorship at University College Cardiff, succeeding Andrew Seth as Professor of Logic and Philosophy.

In 1894 he was appointed Regius Professor of Moral Philosophy at the University of Aberdeen, and finally in 1900 he succeeded Henry Sidgwick in the Knightbridge Professorship at the University of Cambridge. He held this post until his retirement in 1933. He received the honorary degree Legum Doctor (LLD) from the University of Edinburgh in April 1900, and was made a Fellow of the British Academy in 1905.

Sorley's main philosophical interest was the place of moral values in the constitution of the universe. He thought that moral values are objective, a view he explains in his Gifford lectures and in his early work on the ethics of naturalism. What is morally good is what we are morally bound to pursue within our ability to do so. If it does not lie within our power to act in a certain way, then we are not bound to pursue it and it cannot be a moral value.

He is now remembered for his A History of British Philosophy to 1900, published in 1920, with its idiosyncratic slant, as a retrospective view from the point of view of British Idealism. Among his other published works are: The Ethics of Naturalism: a Criticism (second edition 1904), The Moral Life and Moral Worth (1911), and his Gifford Lectures which he gave in 1914-15 and were published under the title Moral Values and the Idea of God (second edition 1921). In his obituary, J.H. Muirhead said of this: "I can remember the sense of freshness and power that this book gave us all at the time". The poet Charles Sorley was his son.

During the long argument about admitting women as students at Cambridge, there were votes by the Senate in 1897 and again in 1920, following intense public debates among lecturers and undergraduates, and the circulation of many flysheets propounding arguments for and against. Sorley was persistently hostile to any presence of women at Cambridge and argued that they were not after equality but sought power and would damage university life. He authored several flysheets with William Ridgeway – both wanted women totally excluded from Cambridge and instead a separate women's university set up for them.

He died in Cambridge on 28 July 1935 aged 79, following an illness from pneumonia.

== Publications ==
- The Ethics of Naturalism (Edinburgh, 1885)
- Recent Tendencies in Ethics (Edinburgh, 1904)
- The Moral Life and Moral Worth (Cambridge, 1911)
- A History of English Philosophy (Cambridge, 1920)
