= Renford Bambrough =

British philosopher (1926–1999)

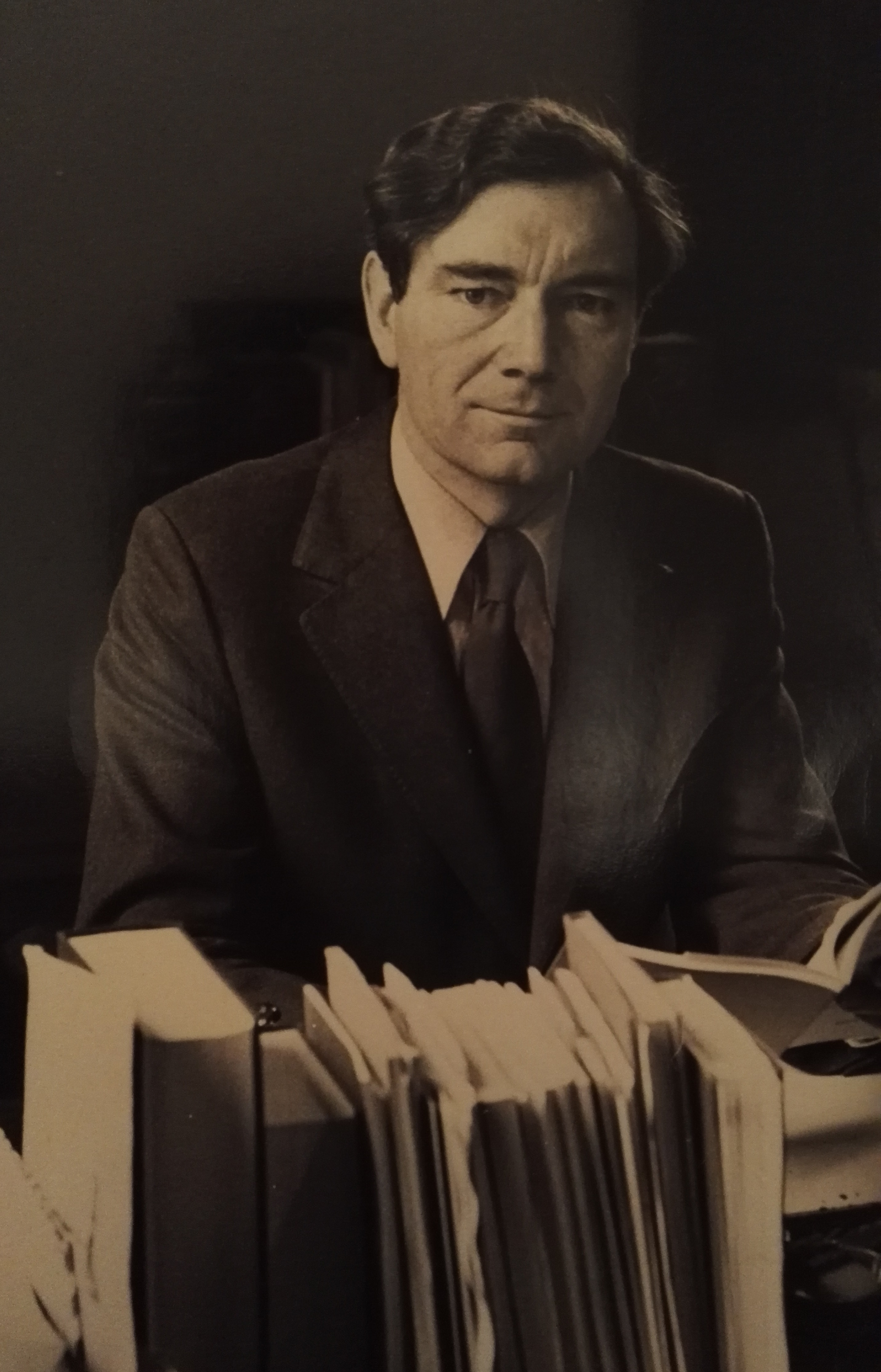
Renford Bambrough, taken 1974 in St John's College, Cambridge

John Renford Bambrough (29 April 1926 – 17 January 1999) was a British philosopher. He was fellow of St John's College, Cambridge from 1950 to 1999, where he held the positions of Dean (1964–1979) and President (1979–1983).

== Life ==
John Renford Bambrough was born in Silksworth, Sunderland, England on 29 April 1926. He was born into a mining background, his father having been an electrician at Silksworth Colliery. And he himself worked, as part of his national service, in a coalmine at Wearmouth Colliery from 1944 to 1945 as a Bevin Boy.

Bambrough was educated at Bede Grammar School in Sunderland and then at St John's College, Cambridge, where he graduated with a first in Classics in 1947 and was awarded a John Stewart of Rannoch Scholarship in the subject. After completing his graduate studies he was appointed a Fellow of St John's in 1950, a Tutor two years later, Dean in 1964 and, eventually, President from 1979 until 1983. During his time as Dean he was faced with severe student disruption in the aftermath of the 'events' that had erupted in Paris during May 1968.

He was the editor of Philosophy (the journal of the Royal Institute of Philosophy) from 1972 to 1994. Bambrough edited a Festschrift in honour of John Wisdom titled Wisdom: Twelve Essays (1974). He was also noted for his works on Aristotle.

Bambrough married his wife Moira in 1952. He was beset by Lewy body dementia in his later years, and died in Cambridge on 17 January 1999.

== Works ==
=== Books authored ===
- Reason, Truth and God (1969)
- Moral Skepticism and Moral Knowledge (1979)

=== Books edited ===
- The Philosophy of Aristotle (1963)
- New Essays on Plato and Aristotle (1965)
- Plato, Popper and Politics: Some Contributions to a Modern Controversy (1967).
- Wisdom: Twelve Essays (1974)

=== Select papers/book chapters etc. ===
- 'Universals and Family Resemblances', Proceedings of the Aristotelian Society, vol. 61 (1960–61), pp. 207–22.
- 'A Proof of the Objectivity of Morals', American Journal of Jurisprudence, vol. 14 (1969), pp. 37–53.
- 'Objectivity and Objects', Proceedings of the Aristotelian Society, vol. 72 (1971–2), pp. 65–81.
- 'Plato's Political Analogies', in: Vlastos, Gregory (ed.) Plato: a collection of critical essays v. II (1971)
- Conflict and the Scope of Reason, the St. John's College, Cambridge, lecture, 1973-74, delivered at the University of Hull, 8 March 1973, (1974)
- '"Literature and philosophy" in: Wisdom: Twelve Essays (1974), pp. 274–292
- 'Essay on Man', in: R.S. Peters (ed.), Nature and Conduct, Royal Institute of Philosophy Lectures, vol. 8 (1975), pp. 1–13.
- 'The Shape of Ignorance', in: Lewis, Hywel David (ed.) Contemporary British Philosophy Personal Statements Fourth Series (1976)
- 'Intuition and the inexpressible', In Steven T. Katz (ed.), Mysticism and Philosophical Analysis. (1978)
- 'Thought, Word and Deed', Proceedings of the Aristotelian Society, suppl. vol. 54 (1980), pp.105–17.
- 'Aristotle and Agamemnon', in: Griffiths, A. Phillips (ed.), Philosophy and Literature, Royal Institute of Philosophy Lectures 16 (1983) pp. 29–40.
- 'Discipline and Discipleship', in: Ilham Dilman (ed.), Philosophy and Life: Essays on John Wisdom (The Hague, 1984), pp. 201–17.
- 'Articulation and Justification', The Monist, vol. 71 (July 1988), pp. 311–19.
- 'Ounces of Example: Henry James, Philosopher' in: Boyle, Nicholas (ed.) Realism in European Literature, Essays in Honour of J P Stern (1986)
- "Fools and Heretics" in: Griffiths, A. Phillips (ed.),Wittgenstein Centenary Essays, Royal Institute of Philosophy supplement 28 (1991)
- 'Ethics and the Limits of Consistency', Proceedings of the Aristotelian Society, vol. 90 (1989–90), pp. 1–15.
- 'Reason and Faith—I', in: Warner, Martin (ed.), Religion and Philosophy, Royal Institute of Philosophy Supplement 31 (1992) pp. 23–32
- "Invincible Knowledge" in: Griffiths, A. Phillips .(ed.), Ethics, Royal Institute of Philosophy Supplements, 35, 51–62. (1993)
- 'Question Time' in: Fellows, Roger (ed.) Philosophy and Technology, Royal Institute of Philosophy Supplement 38 pp. 189–201 (1995)

For a more complete listing of publications see PhilPapers
