= John Alexander Stewart (philosopher) =

Scottish writer, educator and philosopher

- Born: 19 October 1846; Moffat, Dumfriesshire, Scotland
- Died: 27 December 1933 (aged 87); Oxford, England
- Occupations: Writer, philosopher, educator, lecturer
- Spouse: Helen J. Macmillan (1875–1925)
- Writing career
- Genres: Fiction, poetry, non-fiction, essay, philosophical literature, literary criticism
- Notable works: Notes on the Nicomachean Ethics of Aristotle, The Myths of Plato

John Alexander Stewart (19 October 1846 – 27 December 1933) was a Scottish writer, educator and philosopher. He was a university professor and classical lecturer at Christ Church, Oxford from 1875 to 1883, White's Professor of Moral Philosophy at Oxford, and professorial fellow of Corpus Christi College, from 1897 to his retirement in 1927. Throughout his academic career, he was an editor and author of works on Aristotle and considered one of the foremost experts on the subject. His best known books were Notes on the Nicomachean Ethics of Aristotle (1892) and The Myths of Plato (1905).

== Biography ==
John Alexander Stewart was born at Moffat, Dumfriesshire on 19 October 1846, the eldest son of the Rev. Archibald Stewart, D.D. Educated at Edinburgh University and Lincoln College, Oxford, he received the Newdigate Prize for English verse in 1868; he recited the prize-winning poem, 'The Catacombs', in the Theatre, Oxford, on 17 June that year. Stewart took a First in Classical Moderations, 1868, and a First in Greats in 1870. He was awarded his MA three years later. He was elected Senior Student of Christ Church, a position he held from 1870 to 1875, prior to marrying Helen J. Macmillan. Following his graduation, he continued to teach at Christ Church and was a classical lecturer there until 1882, occasional tutor and philosophy lecturer until 1897.

Over the next decade, he gradually established a formidable reputation as an authority on the ethics of Aristotle. Among his works were the 2-volume Nicomachean Ethics of Aristotle (1892) and The Myths of Plato (1905). He was also a contributor to the Encyclopædia Britannica. In 1897, he was appointed White's professor of moral philosophy at Oxford and Fellow of Corpus Christi College. His wife Helen died in 1925 and Stewart resigned from his professorship two years later. There were no children by the marriage. Stewart died at Oxford on 27 December 1933.

== Bibliography ==
- The Catacombs (1868)
- The English MSS. of the Nicomachean Ethics (1882)
- Remarks on Certain Memorialists (1899)
- Notes on the Nicomachean Ethics (1902)
- The Myths of Plato (1905)
- Plato's Doctrine of Ideas (1909)
- 'Cambridge Platonists', Encyclopaedia of Religion and Ethics, ed. J. Hastings, 3, 1910, 167-173
- Platonism in English Poetry (1912)
- Oxford After the War & A Liberal Education (1919) - available online : https://archive.org/details/oxfordafterwarli00stewrich
