= Archibald Garden Wernham =

Scottish philosopher

Archibald Garden Wernham (4 March 1916 – 7 May 1989) was a 20th-century Scottish philosopher.

Wernham was born in Kirkcaldy and educated at Robert Gordon's College; Aberdeen University; and Balliol College, Oxford. He served in World War II with the Royal Artillery. He was lecturer, reader and then Regius Professor of Moral Philosophy at the University of Aberdeen from 1960 to 1981.

Academic offices
Preceded by Donald M. MacKinnon	Regius Professor of Moral Philosophy, Aberdeen	Succeeded by L. Gordon Graham
