= William Ernest Johnson =

British philosopher, logician and economic theorist

W. E. Johnson FBA
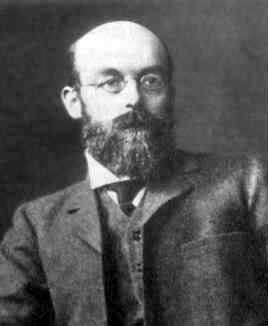
- Johnson, c. 1902
- Born: William Ernest Johnson; 23 June 1858; Cambridge, England
- Died: 14 January 1931 (aged 72); Northampton, England
- Occupations: Philosopher, logician, economist
- Spouse: Barbara Keymer Heaton

Academic background
- Education: King's College, Cambridge
- Academic advisor: Henry Sidgwick

Academic work
- Institutions: King's College, Cambridge
- Notable students: Susan Stebbing; C. D. Broad

William Ernest Johnson (23 June 1858 – 14 January 1931), usually cited as W. E. Johnson, was a British philosopher, logician and economic theorist. He is mainly remembered for his 3 volume Logic which introduced the concept of exchangeability.

== Life and career ==
Johnson was born in Cambridge on 23 June 1858 to William Henry Farthing Johnson and his wife, Harriet (née Brimley), half-sister of the essayist George Brimley. He was their fifth child. The family were Baptists and political liberals.

He attended the Llandaff House School, Cambridge where his father was the proprietor and headteacher, then the Perse School, Cambridge, and the Liverpool Royal Institution School. At the age of around eight he became seriously ill and developed severe asthma and lifelong ill health. Due to this his education was frequently disrupted.

In 1879 he entered King's College, Cambridge to read mathematics having won a scholarship and was placed 11th Wrangler in 1882. He stayed on to study for the Moral Sciences Tripos from which he graduated in 1883 with a First Class degree. Some sources assert that Johnson was a Cambridge Apostle but this is contradicted by Aldrich.

In 1895 he married Barbara Keymer. After her sudden death in 1904 his sister Fanny moved in with him to care for his two sons.

Having failed to win a prize fellowship, he taught mathematics. His first teaching post was as a lecturer in Psychology and Education at the Cambridge Women's Training College, which he held for several years. He was a University Teacher of Theory of Education 1893–1898 and, from 1896 until 1901, University Lecturer in Moral Sciences at the University of Cambridge. In 1902 he was elected a Fellow of King's College, and appointed to the newly created Sidgwick Lectureship, positions he held until his death. In 1923 he was elected a Fellow of the British Academy.

Johnson's students included I. A. Richards, Dorothy Wrinch, C. D. Broad, R. B. Braithwaite and Susan Stebbing. Frank Ramsey is sometimes described as one of his students. However, as John Aldrich notes, Johnson lectured to, and supervised, moral science students and had no official duties toward students of mathematics and there is no evidence Ramsey attended his lectures. Ramsey though, as Sahlin notes, "knew the work of Johnson extremely well". He would review the second part of Johnson's Logic in 1922 and referred to Johnson multiple times in his 1925 paper on 'Universals'.

In 1912 (at Bertrand Russell's request) Johnson attempted to 'coach' Ludwig Wittgenstein in logic but this was an arrangement that was both brief and unsuccessful. They had strong disagreements on logic and philosophy, but got on well when they did not speak about these things. Wittgenstein anonymously committed 200 pounds a year to a research fund for Johnson. He was also kind to Johnson during his ill-health.

He died in St Andrew's Hospital, Northampton, on 14 January 1931 and is buried at Grantchester, Cambridgeshire.

== Work ==
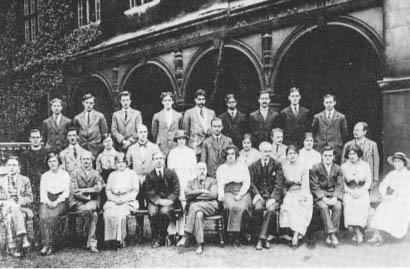
Members of the Moral Science Club circa 1913, with W. E. Johnson sat in the middle of the front row (to the right of Bertrand Russell)

Johnson, who suffered poor health, published little. That, though "very able", he was "lacking in vigour" and had "published almost nothing" is a matter Bertrand Russell commented upon unsympathetically in a letter to Ottoline Morrell of 23 February 1913. Johnson's obituary in The Times, penned by J. M. Keynes, more kindly reports that "his critical intellect did not readily lend itself to authorship." A memorial in Mind also proffered a charitable partial explanation of his reluctance to publish. In plainer terms, C. D. Broad wrote that Johnson "wrote much, but owing to ill-health and excessive diffidence and self-criticism he published very little."

Johnson's major publication was a three volume work Logic which was based on his lectures, Its volumes appeared, along with favourable reviews in the journal Mind, in 1921, 1922, and 1924.

This work may never have been published if it had not been for the efforts of Newnham student Naomi Bentwich (1891–1988). Bentwich persuaded him to publish, typed and co-edited the manuscript and encouraged him to finish the project. The preface to the first volume carries the acknowledgement: "I have to express my great obligations to my former pupil, Miss Naomi Bentwich, without whose encouragement and valuable assistance in the composition and arrangement of the work, it would not have been produced in its present form." A fourth volume on probability was never finished, but parts of it would be published posthumously as articles in Mind.

Logic ensured his election to the British Academy and won him honorary degrees from the universities of Manchester and Aberdeen. Though conceding that Logic was "dated", even at publication, Sébastien Gandon argues that it would be unfair, given "the richness of his thought", to see Johnson "only as a member of the British logic 'old guard' pushed aside by the Principia Mathematica" of Alfred North Whitehead and Bertrand Russell. Gandon contends that "many of Johnson's insights are today an integral part of philosophy" and that this is so especially of Johnson's doctrine of determinable and determinate. Johnson's work and influence in this latter regard is discussed in the Stanford Encyclopedia of Philosophy entry on Determinables and Determinates by Jessica Wilson.

In his early work "The Logical Calculus" (1892), as Baruch Brody notes, he "developed an elegant version of Boolean propositional and functional logic, using conjunction and negation as his primitive symbols." It reveals the technical capabilities of Johnson's youth. The article begins as follows:

"As a material machine economises the exertion of force, so a symbolic calculus economises the exertion of intelligence ... the more perfect the calculus, the smaller the intelligence compared to the results."

A. N. Prior's Formal Logic cites this article several times.

John Passmore tells us:

"His neologisms, as rarely happens, have won wide acceptance: such phrases as "ostensive definition", such contrasts as those between ... "determinates" and "determinables", "continuants" and "occurrents", are now familiar in philosophical literature." (Passmore, 1957, p. 346)

He is also credited with coining the term 'redundancy theory of truth'. Of his discussion of it, as Sahlin writes:

W. E. Johnson in his Logic of 1921 discusses the eliminability of the predicate 'true'. According to Johnson, this predicate and its semantic import is best understood if it is compared with the functioning of the number '1' within arithmetic. Multiplying a number by 1 does not change anything, nor does adding 'it is true' to a sentence.

Ramsey, as Sahlin notes, likely wrote his more substantial remarks on the topic thinking a reference to Johnson superfluous. Of Johnson, Keynes writes:

If his influence on Cambridge thought is to be summed up briefly, it may be said that he was the first to exercise the epistemic side of logic, the links between logic and the psychology of thought. In a school of thought whose natural leanings were towards formal logic, he was exceptionally well equipped to write formal logic himself and to criticise everything which was being contributed to the subject along formal lines.

=== Economics ===
Johnson wrote three papers on economics. The first two, both published in the Cambridge Economic Club, being 1891's "Exchange and Distribution" and 1894's "On Certain Questions Connected with Demand" (the latter being co-written with C. P. Langer). Of ‘The Pure Theory of Utility Curves’ (1913) Baumol & Goldfeld (who reprinted all three papers with brief commentary) said it was "a considerable advance in the development of utility theory". Joseph Schumpeter described it as an "important paper [that] contains several results that should secure for its author a place in any history of our science”.

He wrote fourteen entries for the first edition of R. H. Inglis Palgrave's Dictionary of Political Economy (1894–1899), mostly on economic method. He also lectured on mathematical economics from 1905–1922. He was of particular influence on John Maynard Keynes and had been a colleague of his father John Neville Keynes.

== Select publications ==
- "Exchange and Distribution" (1891)
- Treatise on Trigonometry (1889)
- "The Logical Calculus" Mind, Vol 1 (1892): [In 3 parts: pp. 3–30, pp. 235–250, pp. 340–357].
- (with C. P. Langer) "On Certain Questions Connected with Demand" (1894)
- "Sur la théorie des equations logiques" Bibliothèque du Congrès International de Philosophie, Volume 3, 1901, Logique et Histoire des Sciences, pp. 185–199.
- "The Pure Theory of Utility Curves" The Economic Journal, Vol. 23, No. 92 (December, 1913).
- "Analysis of Thinking" Mind, Vol 27 (1918): [In 2 parts: pp. 1–21, pp. 133–151].
- Logic, Part I, (Cambridge, 1921)
- Logic, Part II, (Cambridge, 1922)
- Logic, Part III, (Cambridge, 1924)
- "Probability: The Relations of Proposal to Supposal" Mind, Vol. 41, No. 161, 1932, pp. 1–16.
- "Probability: Axioms" Mind, Vol. 41, No. 163, 1932, pp. 281–96.
- "Probability: The Deductive and Inductive Problems" Mind, Vol. 41, No. 164, 1932, pp. 409–23.
