= Bill Brewer =

British philosopher

- Born: 19 January 1964 (age 62)

Education
- Education: Wadham College, Oxford, and Oriel College, Oxford (D. Phil)

Philosophical work
- Era: 21st-century philosophy
- Region: Western philosophy
- School: Analytic philosophy
- Institutions: King's College, Cambridge; King's College London
- Main interests: philosophy of mind, metaphysics, epistemology

Bill Brewer is a British philosopher and Susan Stebbing Professor of Philosophy at King's College London.

He was an undergraduate at Wadham College, Oxford, and a Senior Scholar at Oriel College, Oxford, reading Maths and Philosophy and graduating B. Phil. and D. Phil in Philosophy, supervised by P. F. Strawson, David Pears, Jennifer Hornsby, and John Campbell. He was then a Research Fellow at King's College, Cambridge, a Tutorial Fellow and University Lecturer at St Catherine's College, Oxford, and next a Professor in the Philosophy Department at the University of Warwick. He has also been a visiting Lecturer at Brown University, Hamburg, and the University of California, Berkeley.

In September 2012 Brewer was elected as the Susan Stebbing Professor of Philosophy at King's College, London.

== Books ==
- Perception and Reason, Oxford University Press, 1999
- Perception and Its Objects, Oxford University Press, 2011
