= James Griffin (philosopher) =

American philosopher (1933–2019)

- Born: James Patrick Griffin; 8 July 1933
- Died: 21 November 2019 (aged 86)

Education
- Education: St Antony's College, Oxford
- Doctoral advisor: Gilbert Ryle

James Patrick Griffin (8 July 1933 – 21 November 2019) was an American-born philosopher, who was White's Professor of Moral Philosophy at the University of Oxford from 1996 to 2001.

== Education ==
Griffin was educated at Choate School in Wallingford, Connecticut, and Yale University, obtaining a BA in 1955. He was then a Rhodes Scholar at Corpus Christi College, Oxford (1955–58), then a senior scholar at St Antony's College, Oxford (1958–60), obtaining his doctorate under the supervision of Gilbert Ryle in 1960.

== Career ==
After lecturing at Christ Church, Oxford from 1960 to 1966, he was appointed a Fellow of Keble College, Oxford in 1966, a position he held until 1996. He was then appointed White's Professor of Moral Philosophy at Oxford, becoming a Fellow of Corpus Christi College; he was appointed an Honorary Fellow of Keble in 1996, and also became an Emeritus Fellow of Corpus Christi.

In 2000 Griffin became distinguished visiting professor of philosophy at Rutgers University and in 2002 adjunct professor at the Centre for Applied Philosophy and Public Ethics in Australia in Canberra.

Griffin visited the Chinese University of Hong Kong in spring, 2010, as its thirteenth Tang Chun-I Visiting Professor, conducting a four-week graduate seminar What, if anything, can Philosophy Contribute to Normative Ethics? and also spoke on Human Dignity as the Ground of Human Rights, as well as addressing the issue, Does 'ought' imply 'can'? in a public lecture.

Griffin was awarded the Commission of National Education Medal from Poland (1992), the Order of Diego de Losada from Venezuela (1999) and Doctor honoris causa conferred by the University of Santiago de Compostela (2003).

Griffin published five books: Wittgenstein’s Logical Atomism (1965); Well-Being: Its Meaning, Measurement, and Moral Importance (1988); Value Judgement: Improving our Ethical Beliefs (1996); On Human Rights (2008); What Can Philosophy Contribute to Ethics? (2015).

He died on 21 November 2019 at the age of 86.

== Selected bibliography ==
His publications include:

- Griffin, James (1964). Wittgenstein's logical atomism. Oxford, Oxfordshire: Clarendon Press. OCLC 525515.
- Griffin, James (1986). Well-being: its meaning, measurement, and moral importance. Oxford, Oxfordshire: Clarendon Press. ISBN 9780198248439.
- Griffin, James (1996). Value judgement: improving our ethical beliefs. Oxford New York: Clarendon Press Oxford University Press. ISBN 9780198235538.
- Griffin, James (2008). On human rights. Oxford New York: Oxford University Press. ISBN 9781435633452.
- Griffin, James (2015). What Can Philosophy Contribute To Ethics?. Oxford New York: Oxford University Press. ISBN 978-0198748090.
