= John Wisdom =

British philosopher (1904–1993)

- Wisdom by Judith Jarvis Thomson (Note: "Thomson was especially impressed by John Wisdom, a follower of Wittgenstein and Thomson's Cambridge supervisor. His papers, she wrote, 'are often witty, and they are rich in clever examples'". She contributed the frontispiece and an essay to his 1975 Festschrift.)
- Born: Arthur John Terence Dibben Wisdom; 12 September 1904; Leyton, Essex, England
- Died: 9 December 1993 (aged 89); Cambridge, England

Education
- Education: Fitzwilliam House, Cambridge

Philosophical work
- Era: 20th-century philosophy
- Region: Western philosophy
- School: Analytic philosophy Ordinary language philosophy
- Institutions: University of St Andrews; University of Cambridge; University of Oregon
- Notable students: Iris Murdoch; Stephen Toulmin
- Notable ideas: Parable of the Invisible Gardener

Arthur John Terence Dibben Wisdom (12 September 1904 – 9 December 1993), usually cited as John Wisdom, was a leading British philosopher considered to be an ordinary language philosopher, a philosopher of mind and a metaphysician. He was influenced by G. E. Moore, Ludwig Wittgenstein, and Sigmund Freud, and in turn explained and extended their work. He is not to be confused with the philosopher John Oulton Wisdom (1908–1993), his cousin, who shared his interest in psychoanalysis.

== Life ==
The son of an Anglican clergyman, Wisdom was educated at Monkton Combe School, Bath,Aldeburgh Lodge School, Suffolk, and Fitzwilliam House, Cambridge, where he graduated with a first-class BA degree in Moral Sciences in 1924. He worked for five years at the National Institute of Industrial Psychology and was then a lecturer in the department of logic and metaphysics at the University of St Andrews from 1929 until 1934. Wisdom then returned to his alma mater, Cambridge University, as a Lecturer in Philosophy. There at Trinity College he was soon elected a fellow. Between the years 1948 and 1950 he delivered the famous Gifford Lectures on religion at the University of Aberdeen. He was president of the Aristotelian Society from 1950 to 1951. At Cambridge he became Professor of Philosophy in 1952, succeeding G. H. von Wright, and retiring in 1968.

At the end of his career, from 1968 to 1972, he was a Professor of Philosophy at the University of Oregon. A Festschrift, Wisdom: Twelve Essays (1974) edited by Renford Bambrough, was published near the time of his retirement from there. Reviewing the same, Peter Winch writes of having "learned so much in the post-war years about what philosophy is and is capable of being from Wisdom's writings".

Dying in 1993, he was cremated and his ashes were buried at the Parish of the Ascension Burial Ground in Cambridge.

== Philosophical work ==
Before the posthumous publication of Wittgenstein's Philosophical Investigations in 1953, Wisdom's writings were, writes Milkov, "read as indicators of the directions that Wittgenstein’s thought was taking following the latter’s return to philosophy in 1929". Indeed, according to David Pole, "in some directions at least Wisdom carries Wittgenstein's work further than he himself did, and faces its consequences more explicitly." Milkov however contends that:

In contrast to Wittgenstein, Wisdom ... maintained that most significant philosophical problems originate not with language but, in the first instance, as a result of our encounter with problems of the real world. From this standpoint, Wisdom introduced into analytic philosophy the discourse on the meaning of life and on problems of philosophy of religion.

Wisdom's 1936 essay "Philosophical Perplexity" was described by J. O. Urmson as the first article "which throughout embodied the new philosophical outlook, it is something of a landmark in the history of philosophy."

Wisdom wrote a number of essays addressing the question of the nature of religious beliefs, statements, and questions. Appraising this work, D. Z. Phillips writes that; "no one among contemporary philosophers has done more than Wisdom to show us that religious beliefs are not experimental hypotheses about the world". Wisdom utilises his famous Parable of the Invisible Gardener to this end.

The first recorded use of the term "analytic philosophers" occurred in Wisdom's 1931 work Interpretation and Analysis in Relation to Bentham's Theory of Definition, which expounded on Bentham's concept of "paraphrasis": "that sort of exposition which may be afforded by transmuting into a proposition, having for its subject some real entity, a proposition which has not for its subject any other than a fictitious entity". At first Wisdom referred to "logic-analytic philosophers", then to "analytic philosophers". According to Michael Beaney, "the explicit articulation of the idea of paraphrasis in the work of both Wisdom in Cambridge and Ryle in Oxford represents a definite stage in the construction of analytic philosophy as a tradition".

== Quotes ==
If I were asked to answer, in one sentence, the question 'What was Wittgenstein's biggest contribution to philosophy', I should answer 'His asking of the question "Can one play chess without the Queen?"'.

== Writings ==
For a more complete list of works see Wisdom: Twelve Essays (1974).

=== Books ===
- Interpretation and Analysis in Relation to Bentham's Theory of Definition (1931)
- Problems of Mind and Matter (1934)
- Philosophy and Psycho-analysis (1953)
- Paradox and Discovery (1965)
- Proof and Explanation, the Virginia Lectures, 1957 (1991)
- Logical constructions (1969)

=== Papers ===
- "God and Evil" in Mind, Vol. 44, No. 173 (Jan., 1935), pp. 1–20.
- "Philosophical Perplexity," in Proceedings of the Aristotelian Society, Volume 37, Issue 1, 1 June 1937, pp. 71–88.
- "Metaphysics and Verification" in Mind, Vol. 47, No. 188 (Oct., 1938), pp. 452–498.
- "Moore's Technique", in Paul Schilpp (ed.) The Philosophy of G.E. Moore, Volume 2.
- "Philosophy, Anxiety and Novelty", in Mind, Vol. 53, No. 210 (Apr., 1944), pp. 170–176.
- "L. Susan Stebbing, 1885-1943" in Mind, Vol. 53, No. 211 (Jul., 1944), pp. 283–285.
- "Gods" in Proceedings of the Aristotelian Society, Vol. 45 (1944-1945), pp. 185–206.
- "The Concept of Mind" in Proceedings of the Aristotelian Society, New Series, Vol. 50 (1949 - 1950), pp. 189–204.
- "Ludwig Wittgenstein, 1934-1937" in Mind, New Series, Vol. 61, No. 242 (Apr., 1952), pp. 258–260.
- "G. E. Moore" in Analysis, Vol. 19, No. 3 (Jan., 1959), pp. 49–53.
- "A Feature of Wittgenstein's Technique" in Proceedings of the Aristotelian Society, Supplementary Volumes, Vol. 35 (1961), pp. 1–14.
- "The Metamorphosis of Metaphysics" (1961) in Proceedings of the British Academy Vol. 47, pp. 37–59.
- "Eternal Life" in Royal Institute of Philosophy Supplements, Volume 2, March 1968, pp. 239–250.
- "Epistemological Enlightenment" in Proceedings and Addresses of the American Philosophical Association, Vol. 44 (1970-1971), pp. 32–44.
- "Appearance and Reality" in Philosophy, Vol. 52, No. 199 (Jan., 1977), pp. 3–11.
