= Analysis (journal) =

- Discipline: Philosophy
- Language: English
- Edited by: Stacie Friend, Lee Walters, Roger Clark

Publication details
- History: 1933–present
- Publisher: Oxford University Press
- Frequency: Quarterly

Standard abbreviations
- ISO 4: Analysis
- MathSciNet: Analysis (Oxford)

Indexing
- ISSN: 0003-2638 (print); 1467-8284 (web)
- LCCN: 2002-238559
- JSTOR: 00032638
- OCLC no.: 49855776

Links
- Journal homepage; Analysis Trust

Analysis is a peer-reviewed academic journal of philosophy established in 1933 that is published quarterly by Oxford University Press on behalf of the Analysis Trust. Prior to January 2009, the journal was published by Blackwell Publishing. Electronic access to this journal is available via JSTOR (1933–2013), Wiley InterScience (1996–2008), and Oxford Journals (2009–present). The journal publishes short, concise articles (of up to 4000 words, excluding bibliography) in virtually any field of the analytic tradition.

The journal was founded in 1933 by philosophers from Oxford, Cambridge, and London, who were influenced by the views and methods of philosophers like Bertrand Russell, G.E. Moore, and Ludwig Wittgenstein. Its first issued appeared in November of that year.

== Editors ==
- 1933–1948: Austin Duncan-Jones
- 1948–1956: Margaret MacDonald
- 1956–1965: Bernard Mayo
- 1965–1971: Peter Winch
- 1971–1976: C. J. F. Williams
- 1976–1987: Christopher Kirwan
- 1987–1999: Peter Smith
- 2000–2016: Michael Clark
- 2016–2017: Chris Daly and David Liggins
- 2017–2021: David Liggins
- 2021–2024: David Liggins, Stacie Friend, and Lee Walters
- 2024–present: Stacie Friend, Lee Walters, and Roger Clark

== Noteworthy articles ==
A number of noteworthy works by notable authors have been published in the journal. These include{

- Toulmin, Stephen. (1948). "The Logical Status of Psycho-Analysis". 9 (2), pp. 23–29.
- Church, Alonzo. (1950). "On Carnap's Analysis of Statements of Assertion and Belief". 10 (5), pp. 97–99.
- Anderson, Alan Ross. (1951). "A Note on Subjunctive and Counterfactual Conditionals". 12 (2), pp. 35–38.
- Nuel Belnap. (1962) "Tonk, Plonk and Plink". 22 (6) pp. 130–134.
- Gettier, Edmund. (1963). "Is Justified True Belief Knowledge?". 23 (6), pp. 121–123.
- Lewis, David. (1988). "Vague Identity: Evans Misunderstood". 48 (3), pp. 128–130.
- Clark, Andy and Chalmers, David. (1998). "The Extended Mind". 58 (1), pp. 7–19.
- Knobe, Joshua. (2003). "Intentional Action and Side Effects in Ordinary Language". 63 (279), pp. 190–194.

== See also ==
- List of philosophy journals
