= David E. Cooper =

British philosopher and writer (born 1942)

David Edward Cooper (born 1942) is a British philosopher and writer. He is Emeritus Professor of Philosophy at Durham University.

== Career ==
Cooper is a British author and philosopher. He was brought up in Surrey and educated at Highgate School and then St Edmund Hall, Oxford, the University at which he was given his first job in 1967, as a Lecturer in Philosophy. He went on to teach at the universities of Miami, London and Surrey before being appointed, in 1986, as Professor of Philosophy at Durham University – where he remained until retiring in 2008. During his academic career, David was a visiting professor at universities in the United States, Canada, Malta, Sri Lanka and South Africa. In 2022 he was Distinguished International Visiting Professor at Peking University. Cooper is the former Chair (or President) of the Aristotelian Society, the Mind Association, the Friedrich Nietzsche Society, and the Philosophy of Education Society of Great Britain. He is Secretary and a Trustee of the charity Project Sri Lanka, and he spends time each year visiting and supervising educational and humanitarian projects.

Cooper has published across a broad range of philosophical subjects, including philosophy of language, philosophy of education, ethics, aesthetics, environmental philosophy, animal ethics, philosophy of technology, philosophy of religion, history of both Western philosophy and Asian philosophy, and modern European philosophy, especially Heidegger, Nietzsche, and Wittgenstein. In recent years, Cooper has written widely on environmental and Buddhist aesthetics, music and nature, the relationship of beauty and virtue, cultures of food, the significance of gardens, Daoism, our relationship to animals, the notion of mystery, and philosophical pessimism and misanthropy.

He is joint editor of Key Thinkers on the Environment. Cooper is a regular reviewer of books for magazines, including The Times Literary Supplement and The Los Angeles Review of Books. He is also the author of four novels, all set in Sri Lanka: Street Dog: A Sri Lankan Story, its sequel, Old Stripe, A Shot on the Beach. and The Crossjack Club.

== Animal ethics ==
Cooper authored Animals and Misanthropy in 2018 which defends the thesis that misanthropy is justified towards humankind in the light of how humans both compare with and treat animals.

== Selected publications ==
- Philosophy and the Nature of Language (London: Longman, 1975).
- Illusions of Equality (London: Routledge, 1980).
- Authenticity and Learning: Nietzsche's Educational Philosophy (London: Routledge, 1983).
- Metaphor (Oxford: Blackwell, 1986).
- Heidegger (London: Claridge, 1996).
- World Philosophies: An Historical Introduction, 1st ed. (Blackwell, 1996).
- Existentialism: A Reconstruction (Oxford: Blackwell, 1999).
- The Measure of Things: Humanism, Humility and Mystery (Oxford: Oxford University Press, 2002).
- World Philosophies: An Historical Introduction, 2nd ed. (Blackwell, 2003).
- Meaning (Chesham, Bucks: Acumen, 2003).
- Buddhism, Virtue and Environment (with Simon P. James) (Aldershot: Ashgate 2005).
- A Philosophy of Gardens (Oxford: Oxford University Press, 2006).
- Convergence with Nature: A Daoist Perspective (Dartington: Green Books, 2012).
- Sunlight on the Sea: An Essay in Phenomenology (Kindle ebook, 2013).
- Senses of Mystery: Engaging with Nature and the Meaning of Life (Abingdon: Routledge 2017).
- Animals and Misanthropy (Abingdon: Routledge 2018).
- Street Dog: A Sri Lankan Story (Colombo: Sarasavi 2018)
- Old Stripe: A sequel to Street Dog (Amazon: 2019)
- A Shot on the Beach (Colombo: Jam Fruit Tree Publications 2020)
- The Crossjack Club (Amazon 2022)
- Pessimism, Quietism and Refuge in Nature (Newcastle, Agenda 2024)
- Natural Beauty: Why It matters to Us (Edinburgh University Press 2027)

== See also ==
- Animal ethics
