= Daniel J O'Connor =

British philosopher

Philosophical work
- Era: 21st-century philosophy
- Region: Western philosophy

Daniel J O'Connor (1914–2012) was a British philosopher who taught at the University of Exeter. He was known for his works on ancient philosophy.

== Books ==
- Aquinas and Natural Law (1967)
- Free Will (1971)
