= William Kneale =

English logician (1906–1990)

William Calvert Kneale (22 June 1906, Liverpool – 24 June 1990, Grassington) was an English logician best known for his 1962 book The Development of Logic, a history of logic from its beginnings in Ancient Greece written with his wife Martha. Kneale was also known as a philosopher of science and the author of a book on probability and induction.

Educated at the Liverpool Institute High School for boys, he later became a fellow of Exeter College, Oxford, and in 1960 succeeded to the White's Professor of Moral Philosophy previously occupied by the linguistic philosopher J. L. Austin. He retired in 1966.

== Life and work ==
Kneale's interest in the history of logic began in the 1940s. The focus of much of Kneale's early work was the legacy of the work of the 19th century logician George Boole. His first major publication in the history of logic was his paper "Boole and the Revival of Logic," published in the philosophy journal Mind in 1948. He was also the author of a number of papers in philosophical logic, particularly on the nature of truth for natural languages, and the role that linguistic concepts play in the treatment of logical paradoxes.

Kneale worked on his great history of logic from 1947 to 1957 together with his wife Martha (who was responsible for the chapters on the ancient Greeks). The result was the 800-page The Development of Logic, first published in 1962, which went through five impressions before going into a second, paperback, edition in 1984.

The 'History' is commonly referred to in the academic world simply as "Kneale and Kneale". It was the only major history of logic available in English in the mid-twentieth century, and the first major history of logic in English since The Development of Symbolic Logic published in 1906 by A. T. Shearman. The treatise has been a standard work in the history of logic for decades.

In 1938, he married Martha Hurst; they had two children, George (born 1942) and Jane (married name Heal); born 1946).

== Selected publications ==
- Kneale, W. C., & Kneale, M. (1962). The Development of Logic. Oxford University Press.
- Kneale, W. (1949). Probability and induction. Oxford: Clarendon Press. Pages 92-110 reprinted as “Induction, explanation, and transcendent hypotheses” in H. Feigl and M. Brodbeck (Eds.), Readings in the philosophy of science. New York: Appleton-CenturyCrofts, 1953. Pp. 353-367.
- Kneale, M. (1968, January). Eternity and sempiternity. In Proceedings of the Aristotelian Society (Vol. 69, pp. 223-238). Aristotelian Society, Wiley.
