= H. O. Mounce =

British philosopher (born 1939)

Howard O. Mounce
- Born: 1939 (age 86–87); Swansea, Wales

Philosophical work
- Era: 21st-century philosophy
- Region: Western philosophy
- Institutions: University of Wales Swansea

Howard Owen Mounce (born 1939) is a British philosopher and Honorary Fellow of Swansea University. He was a long-serving lecturer on philosophy at the then University College of Swansea. Influenced by Rush Rhees, he is amongst those labelled as members of the "Swansea School" or as "Swansea Wittgensteinians". He is a former editor-of Philosophical Investigations, and has made contributions to a broad range of areas including the philosophy of language, the philosophy of religion, metaphysics, ethics, and aesthetics.

== Life and career ==
H. O. Mounce was born in early 1939 in Swansea (then in Glamorganshire).

A student (and later colleague) of Rush Rhees, who Hertzberg describes as a "formative influence". Mounce obtained his B.A. in 1961 from the then University College of Swansea. He remained there as a tutor over 1962–1963, He was then a lecturer at the then University College of Cardiff 1963–1968, before returning to Swansea as a lecturer in philosophy in 1968/1969. He remained at Swansea, latterly with the position of Senior Lecturer in Philosophy (finally at the then University of Wales at Swansea), until 1999 when he was then elected an honorary fellow of what is now Swansea University. Mounce is, along with D. Z. Phillips, İlham Dilman, and R. W. Beardsmore, amongst those later thinkers who, along with Rhees, Peter Winch and R. F. Holland came to be labelled (by others) from the 1960s on as members of the "Swansea School" or as "Swansea Wittgensteinians".

He was the editor-in-chief of the Philosophical Investigations, a journal in which the work of Ludwig Wittgenstein is consistently highlighted, from 2006 to 2022. He took over the position following the death of Phillips and continued in that role until he was succeeded by Mario Von Der Ruhr.

Mounce has, as Weston notes, published books on American Pragmatism, David Hume, moral philosophy (with D.Z. Phillips) and Wittgenstein’s Tractatus, and articles on a wide range of topics "from Zande witchcraft to the smell of coffee". Many of these works are said by Weston to exhibit the influence of the philosophy of Wittgenstein.

== Works ==
=== Books authored ===
- with Phillips, D. Z. (1970) Moral Practices, Studies in Ethics and the Philosophy of Religion Vol. VI, Routledge & Kegan Paul.
- — (1981). Wittgenstein's Tractatus : an introduction. Chicago : University of Chicago Press. ISBN 978-0-226-54318-5.
- — (1997). The Two Pragmatisms: From Peirce to Rorty, Routledge.
- — (1999). Hume's Naturalism, Routledge.
- — (2001). Tolstoy on Aesthetics: What Is Art?. Routledge. ISBN 978-1-351-78738-3.
- — (2007). Metaphysics and the End of Philosophy, Continuum.

=== Select papers and book chapters ===
- with Phillips, D. Z. (1965). "On Morality's Having a Point". Philosophy. 40 (154): 308–319. doi:10.1017/S0031819100069722. ISSN 0031-8191. JSTOR 3748949.
- with Hamlyn, D. W. (1971). "Self-Deception". Proceedings of the Aristotelian Society, Supplementary Volumes. 45: 45–72. doi:10.1093/aristoteliansupp/45.1.45. ISSN 0309-7013. JSTOR 4106576.
- — (1967). "Virtue and the Understanding". Analysis. 28 (1): 11–17. doi:10.2307/3327607. ISSN 0003-2638. JSTOR 3327607.
- — (1973). "Understanding a Primitive Society". Philosophy. 48 (186): 347–362. doi:10.1017/S0031819100042297. ISSN 0031-8191. JSTOR 3749687.
- — (1980). "Art and Real Life". Philosophy. 55 (212): 183–192. doi:10.1017/S0031819100048993. ISSN 0031-8191. JSTOR 3750582.
- — (1989), "Anderson on Generality", in Phillips, D. Z.; Winch, Peter (eds.), Wittgenstein: Attention to Particulars, London: Palgrave Macmillan UK, pp. 61–73, doi:10.1007/978-1-349-11197-8_5, ISBN 978-1-349-11199-2.
- — (1991). "Art and craft". The British Journal of Aesthetics. 31 (3): 230–240. doi:10.1093/bjaesthetics/31.3.230. ISSN 0007-0904.
- — (1989). "The Aroma of Coffee". Philosophy. 64 (248): 159–173. doi:10.1017/S0031819100044454. ISSN 0031-8191. JSTOR 3751405.
- — (1994). "Faith and Reason". Philosophy. 69 (267): 85–95. doi:10.1017/S0031819100046635. ISSN 0031-8191. JSTOR 3751326.
- — (1997). "Philosophy, Solipsism and Thought". The Philosophical Quarterly. 47 (186): 1–18. doi:10.1111/1467-9213.00043. ISSN 0031-8094. JSTOR 2956468.
- — (1998). "Morality and Religion" in Brian Davies (ed.) Philosophy of Religion: A Guide to the Subject, London, pp. 253–286.
- — (2005), "Wittgenstein and Classical Realism", in Moyal-Sharrock, Danièle; Brenner, William H. (eds.), Readings of Wittgenstein's On Certainty, London: Palgrave Macmillan UK, pp. 103–121, doi:10.1057/9780230505346_7, ISBN 978-0-230-53552-7
- — (2010). "An Outline of Pragmatism". Revue française d'études américaines. 124 (2): 49–58. doi:10.3917/rfea.124.0049. ISSN 0397-7870.
- — (2020). "On the Differences Between Rush Rhees and Simone Weil". Philosophical Investigations. 43 (1–2): 71–75. doi:10.1111/phin.12260. ISSN 0190-0536.
