= A. E. Heath =

British philosopher

- Archie Heath, 1934
- Born: Archibald Edward Heath; 6 August 1887
- Died: 18 May 1961 (aged 73)
- Occupations: Philosopher; Professor of Philosophy
- Employer: University College, Swansea
- Organization: Rationalist Press Association Conway Hall Ethical Society

Archibald Edward Heath (6 August 1887 – 18 May 1961) was Foundation Professor of Philosophy at University College, Swansea, 1925–1952. He is commonly classed as a humanist, though Heath was amongst those non-theists and secularists uncomfortable with the term. Within and beyond philosophy, he had particular interest in, and published on, scientific methodology, and education. He is also classed as an 'educationist', (educationalist) and served as a lecturer in education at the Victoria University of Manchester and as a senior lecturer in education at the University of Liverpool before he ever formally taught philosophy.

His appointment of Rush Rhees from 1940, and of R. F. Holland (1950) and Peter Winch (1951), enabled the development under his professorial successor J. R. Jones of the 'Swansea School'. The lasting direct Influence on these (and later) "Swansea Wittgensteinians" was though very much the example and teaching of Rhees who was a friend of Wittgenstein. The 'school-building' achievement of Heath, acknowledged by Jones, was the devoted founding and development of the Swansea philosophy department over 27 years to its reputation as a 'nursery for professors' such as Richard Aaron.

Heath was President of the Rationalist Press Association (RPA) from 1949 until he was succeeded in 1955 by Bertrand Russell (under whom Heath had once studied philosophy) who remained in the post for life.

He is also noted as the English Editor of The Monist.

== Life and career ==
=== Early life and education ===
Archie Heath, as he was known to most and listed in Who's Who, was born on 6 August 1887 in Chesterfield. He was the son of Edward Heath of Hasland, Derbyshire. He was educated at Hasland School, Chesterfield Grammar School, (Note: The school magazine, The Cestrefeldian, which describes Heath as "a native of Chesterfield" (as well as an 'Old Boy') reports that he was "the writer of the words of the School Song", records that he returned to present the school prizes in 1934, and address the audience. He "said that people cannot attain success in several directions, and told of his own little failures. He pointed out that what matters is not petty success, but doing what one can, as well as one can.") and then Nottingham High School before attending Trinity College, Cambridge from 1907.

August 1908's The Educational Times records Heath's status at Trinity as a sizar. As the Encyclopædia Britannica of 1911 explains this means Heath was 'one of a class of students at a college of Cambridge [...] who, being persons of limited means' were 'received for lower fees, and obtained free commons, lodgings or other assistance towards their education during their terms of residence' (though by then the menial duties of “sizars” at Cambridge had long become obsolete). He is recorded as obtaining first class in part one of the Natural Science Tripos in 1909, and being awarded Tripos Part II in the same in 1910 "aegrotat" i.e. he was awarded an unclassified pass in his B.A.degree in the same on the grounds that illness prevented him from attending final examinations he would have otherwise passed. He was Research Student in Physics under J. J. Thomson, 1910–1912. He was awarded a Lees-Knowles Exhibition in 1911. He was awarded an Arnold Gerstenberg Studentship (Note: Isidor Gerstenberg (1821-1876) established the Arnold Gerstenberg Studentship at Cambridge University in 1892 in memory of her brother, a student of Trinity College, who had committed suicide in 1877 at the age of 23.) in 1912, undertaking studies in the Philosophy of Science. He was recognised with the rank of Master of Arts (Note: Unusually, the 'Cambridge M.A.' does not denote the completion of further formal study and academic award but is given as a mark of seniority if successfully applied for 3 or 4 years after B.A. completion.) at Cambridge in 1917.

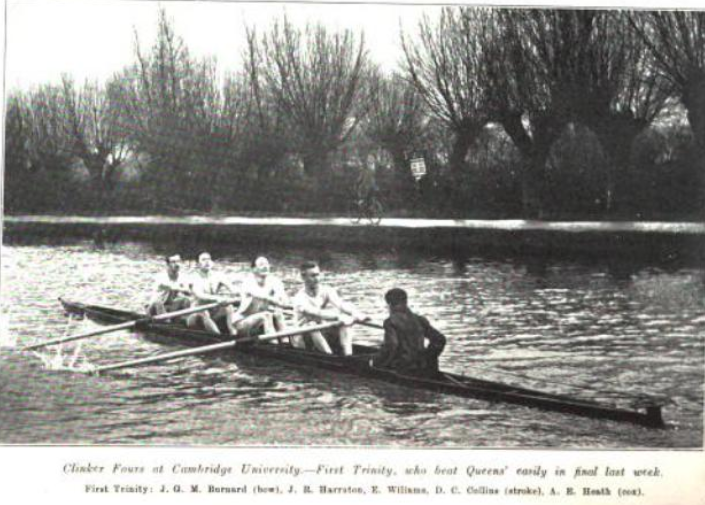
First Trinity rowing team 1911 with A. E. Heath (cox).

==== Rowing ====
Later colleague Glanmor Williams recalls Heath as "an uncommonly short man". This would be the norm for rowing as a 'cox', as he is recorded as doing for Trinity during his student days and beyond (including at the Henley Royal Regatta). Indeed, he is pictured doing so in the Illustrated Sporting and Dramatic News of 25 March 1911. He also wrote (at first pseudonymously) a column Tow-path Topics on the university rowing for the Cambridge Magazine. He is recorded as a member of the Leander Club in 1915. Some years later Heath remarked that his "only athletic distinction consisted in my not being athletic at all. I sat at the end of a long thin boat and said awful things to eight people who were being athletic like anything in front."

=== Schoolmaster and Liverpool lecturer ===
He was a temporary teacher at Oundle School, on the staff of Frederick William Sanderson in 1912. Though his "time at Oundle was short" Heath wrote that "it was long enough for me to learn the value of [his] method of approach, and to appreciate the new spirit which Sanderson was introducing into school science."

From September 1913, he was science master at Bedales School. One of the students he encouraged there was Robin Hill, who went on to be a plant biochemist. (Note: Heath encouraged Hill to take an interest in natural dyes and in astronomy, and his first published paper (1917) was on sunspots. Robin attributed his success in the scholarship examination for Emmanuel College to Heath’s coaching. Heath also recommended Robin to meteorologist C.J.P. Cave who was an important later influence.) Another was Eric M. Rogers whose interest in physics, reports Fuller, was 'nurtured' by the "teacher of small stature, but possessed of a wonderful, eccentric intellect". Frances Partridge of the Bloomsbury Group, another pupil, recalls Heath, with "his basso profundo voice", "as the master I got on best with". Heath remained at Bedales until 1919. He published whilst there. Heath of "The Flat, Steep, Petersfield" is recorded as having been elected to membership of the Aristotelian Society in 1918, and at the society meeting of 17 March 1919 delivered "The Scope of the Scientific Method".

He was appointed a Lecturer In Education at the Victoria University of Manchester in 1919. He was elected the same year as a member of the Manchester Literary & Philosophical Society and read a paper entitled "The disinterested character of Science in view of certain of its working maxims" there the next year. Before he left Manchester, he was also accepted as a member of the British Psychological Society.

He then served as a Senior Lecturer at the University of Liverpool, from 1921 to 1925. Mayer records that by 1921 Heath was "giving systematic instruction" in the history of science. Whilst there he also served as an educational adviser to the governor of the local prison.

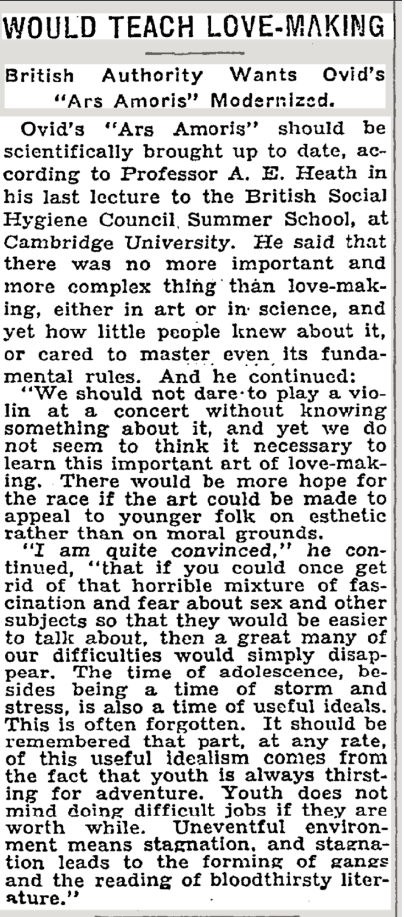
Heath "Would Teach Love-Making" (1928)

=== Professor of Philosophy ===
in 1925 Heath became the first Foundation Professor of Philosophy at the newly established University College, Swansea. Dykes notes his "special interest in the philosophy of science" but says that "his sweep was wide and embraced contemporary movements in art and literature" and he credits him with "the breaking of barriers in the early college between science and the arts".

==== Lectures outside Swansea ====
Dykes notes that he was 'much in demand as an extra-mural lecturer'.

In September 1926 Heath participated at the Sixth International Congress of Philosophy at Cambridge, Massachusetts (the first such congress to be held in America. and the first since the war) presenting, at an open session, part of his paper on "The notion of intelligibility in scientific thought" that was published in full the next year.

In 1928 Heath gave lectures to the British Social Hygiene Council, Summer School, at Cambridge University, the last of which attracted the attention of the New York Times (Note: And for somewhat different reasons, The Electrical Review, a journal for electrical engineers.) and the headline "WOULD TEACH LOVE-MAKING". Heath is quoted therein thus:

We should not dare to play a violin at a concert without knowing something about it, and yet we do not seem to think it necessary to learn this important art of love-making. There would be more hope for the race if the art could be made to appeal to younger folk on esthetic rather than on moral grounds. [..] if you could once get rid of that horrible mixture of fascination and fear about sex and other subjects so that they would be easier to talk about, then a great many of our difficulties would simply disappear.

On 19 October 1930 the same paper would quote from another lecture by Heath before the same council that refers to the 'soundness' of being able to laugh about sex. The same talk would also attract the attention of the Sheffield Independent and the headline "PROFESSOR SPEAKS OF LOVE".

1925 caricature of Archie Heath from the Swansea student magazine Dawn, originally captioned "The Mighty Atom".

In 1929 he was recorded as being a member of the Mind Association. the British Institute of Philosophical Studies. and of the British Institute of Adult Education on the Executive and Research Committees (and by 1934 as vice-chairman of the latter). During 1929 itself he attended, and addressed, the World Conference on Adult Education at Cambridge, England.

He was also an invited speaker at the second International Congress for the History of Science and Technology, in London in 1931. Mayer (2005) describes Heath and fellow participant F. H. (Frank) Hayward, along with Frank Sherwood Taylor, as contemporaries of Joseph Needham "in his desires to integrate intellectual, technological and spiritual progress". Mayer (2002) also identifies him as "an education journalist for the radical magazine Science progress and one of the editors of the Journal for adult education."

The first RPA conference, on ‘Rationalism in Education and Life’, was held at Wadham College, Oxford in August 1945 with a collection of papers read being published the next year. Heath spoke on "Science and Cultural Values" at the inaugural event, with papers on "The Idea of Progress" (1947), "Man in the Round" (1951) and "The Idea of Evolution" (1954) being read at subsequent meetings.

==== Heath as a recruiter ====
With the departure of his colleagues (and appointees) W. B. GallIe and Karl Britton for war service, (Note: "In 1940 Rhees answered an emergency call from Swansea. Professor A.E. Heath's colleagues W.B. GALLIE and Karl BRITTON had departed on war service.") Heath directly recruited Rush Rhees to work alongside him from 1940. Initially this was as a temporary assistant lecturer but Heath managed to secure him a permanent position. Rhees was a friend and disciple of Wittgenstein. Through his appointment of Rhees, and, shortly before his own retirement, of R. F. Holland and Peter Winch, Heath put in place the personalities that would later become known as the 'Swansea School' under hs successor J. R. Jones. D.Z. Phillips, notes that Heath “had an eye for philosophical talent” – his previous appointments having included (as well as the above) R. I. Aaron, H. B. Acton and A. C. Ewing. (Note: Ewing would later recall his "shock" on moving on to Cambridge in 1931 to find the influence of Wittgenstein dominant there, reporting that "the reaction his philosophy provoked in me was one of sharp antagonism".)

Heath's recruitment of philosophical talent was however, at least prior to World War II, constrained by the biases of the administration of the day – he had to inform Susan Stebbing that "he could not persuade the Council to contemplate appointing a woman" in the case of Helen Knight, on which grounds, as she reports, Margaret MacDonald did not apply for an opening. Heath himself is known to have been supportive of female students. His Belanes pupil Frances Partridge records being "grateful to him because when I decided to go to Cambridge he coached me in Logic [...] and succeeded in giving me some taste for abstract ideas." He also tried (unsuccessfully) to convince Swansea student Marian Phillips (1916-2013) to stay on for a fourth year as an undergraduate to gain double honours in Philosophy rather than immediately pursue historical research after graduating in 1935, even travelling "up to Cwmtwrch to argue the case with her father". Like Rhees after her. Phillips, would find entry into academic employment at Swansea through staff leaving for war work – in October 1939 she was offered a temporary assistant lectureship to cover the teaching responsibilities of historian Glyn Roberts, the first Swansea staff member to leave for such duty.

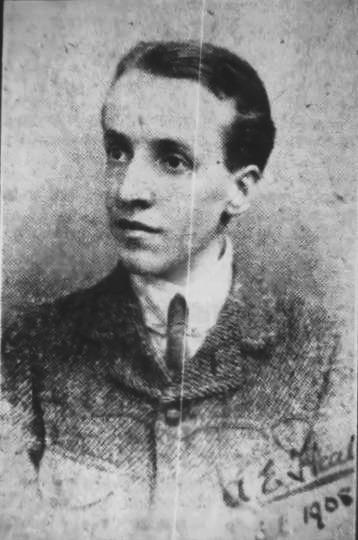
Heath as a young man

=== Thinker's Library and retirement ===
Heath wrote the introduction to the 1948 Thinker's Library edition of the late Stebbing's Ideals and Illusions [1941]. He described Stebbing as someone who had "scared academic persons because she not only professed rationality but also lived it. She made criticism an act of grace." He had participated in at least two symposiums with her before her early death in 1943. Stebbing had also been one of the philosophers listed as an Honorary Associate of the RPA, and had contributed a 'withering' review of Cyril Joad’s God and Evil (1942) to its Literary Guide. As Heath noted, "she was no respecter of persons, eminent or otherwise, when they talked pretentious nonsense."

He also wrote the introduction to a 1950 edition of The Man versus The State by Herbert Spencer within the same series. The year before, he had written the introduction to Philosophy for Pleasure (1949) by fellow humanist Hector Hawton (also published by Watts & Co).

Heath retired from his professorship as emeritus in 1952, to be succeeded by John Robert Jones who, very much unlike his predecessor, was "an intensely serious Christian".

=== Personality ===
Heath was remembered as a philosophy professor as "a man of wide cultural interests who tried to broaden the horizons of his students"– to which end he lent his philosophy student Marian Phillips "a copy of James Joyce's then-banned book, Ulysses, wrapped up in brown paper to look like a text book, so that she could read it on the bus". Dykes describes him as "revered" by students but disliked by many of his colleagues and "prickly, prejudiced and downright to the point of rudeness." Frances Partridge recalls, as a Belandes pupil, that he had "a furious temper when roused" by the boys. Swansea colleague Glanmor Williams recalls Heath as man of "acerbic of wit and tongue" and as "rationalist who delighted in deliberately saying outrageous things to shock the many ministerial students he had in his classes."

=== Humanism ===
Heath was the editor of Scientific Thought in the Twentieth Century, published in 1951. This contained contributions from high-profile thinkers including A. J. Ayer, Ronald Fisher, Peter Medawar, and Sir Harold Spencer Jones. Albert Einstein, wrote to the Rationalist Press Association's Board of Directors congratulating them on the volume. It was reviewed within the RPA's own Literary Guide by A. E. Trueman who had been Head of the Department of Geology at Swansea (1920–1933).

Heath was a Director of the Rationalist Press Association 1946 to 1958; its President from 1949 to 1954, and Vice President from 1955 until his death. Though often classed as a humanist, he was amongst those non-theists and secularists who were uncomfortable with the term. According to Lutgendorff, in 1946, at a World Union of Freethinkers conference which addressed “The Challenges of Humanism", Heath was of the opinion 'that “a philosophy of rationalist humanism” still had to be written'. Asked the next year about rationalism, the term he preferred for his own strand of non-religious thinking and activism, he spoke in terms of what it cannot do, writing that it “cannot give us the glittering prizes of final certitude, which resplendent dogmatisms hold out for our attention. Nor can it provide us with the assurances and comfort of intellectual safety.”

Heath placed great importance on the role of reflection. In the accompanying pamphlet for his 1931 BBC Radio series ‘Thinking Ahead – The Place of Reflection in Civilization,’he placed reflection at the centre of philosophy and of the human condition, arguing that “reflection is man's chief glory”. Humans, according to Heath, “make deliberate use of past experience in present acts” and it is reflection that distinguishes humans from other animals.

== Death ==
Heath died on 18 May 1961.

Heath's funeral was conducted at Swansea by H. J. Blackham, who quoted Heath's words during the humanist ceremony: "The study of human beings, in all their complex doings between a sleep and a sleep, is an endless source of interest and puzzlement."

Blackman also commented om Heath's career long role as a teacher, saying,

"For him, as for Plato, philosophy was naturally linked with education, not by any logical or academic connection, but because they belonged together in him. He was an educator because he liked teaching and had something to teach... Certainly he left his mark upon the minds and fortunes of countless pupils and students at Oundle and Bedales, in Manchester and Liverpool, and for longer than a quarter of a century here in Swansea.”

== Selected publications ==
- 1927 How we behave,.Workers' Educational Association Outlines. London: Longmans, Green & Co., Ltd. 1927. Pp. vi + 90 (Note: Public Domain Reviews:)
  - 1929 (2nd impression)
- 1931: Thinking Ahead: The Place of Reflection in Civilisation London: BBC
- 1936: (with W. E. Williams) Learn and live; London: Methuen.
- 1951: (ed.) Scientific thought in the twentieth century. An authoritative account of fifty year's progress in science London: Watts
