= Rush Rhees =

American philosopher (1905–1989)

- Rush Rhees, photographed by Michael Nedo
- Born: 19 March 1905; Rochester, New York, U.S.
- Died: 22 May 1989 (aged 84); Swansea, Wales
- Spouses: Jean Henderson; Margaret 'Peg' Britton

Education
- Education: University of Rochester, University of Edinburgh, University of Innsbruck, University of Cambridge
- Doctoral advisor: G. E. Moore
- Other advisor: Ludwig Wittgenstein

Philosophical work
- Era: 20th-century philosophy
- Region: Western philosophy
- School: Analytic philosophy
- Institutions: University of Manchester, University College of Swansea, King's College London
- Notable students: D. Z. Phillips
- Main interests: Philosophy of language, philosophy of religion, ethics
- Notable ideas: The possibility of discourse

Rush Rhees (/riːz/; 19 March 1905 – 22 May 1989) was an American philosopher. He is principally known as a student, friend, and literary executor of the philosopher Ludwig Wittgenstein. With G. E. M. Anscombe he was co-editor of Wittgenstein's posthumous Philosophical Investigations (1953), and, with Anscombe and G. H. von Wright, he co-edited Wittgenstein's Remarks on the Foundations of Mathematics (1956). He was solely responsible for the editing of Philosophical Grammar (1974) and Philosophical Remarks (1975). Rhees taught philosophy at what is now Swansea University from 1940 until 1966, when he took early retirement to devote more time to editing Wittgenstein's works.

== Early life and studies ==
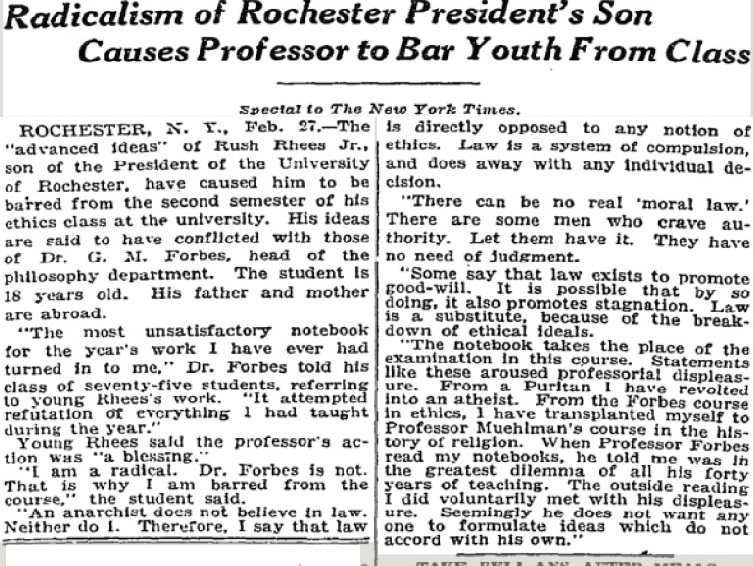
Rush Rhees makes the front page of The New York Times in 1924.

Rush Rhees was born on 19 March 1905 in Rochester, New York. He was the son of Harriet Chapin née Seelye (the daughter of Laurenus Clark Seelye) and her husband (Benjamin) Rush Rhees, a Baptist minister, author and president of the University of Rochester and, via the latter, the great-great-grandson of the radical Welsh-born preacher and pamphleteer Morgan John Rhys. Rhys, who fled to America from Wales in 1794 to avoid prosecution, was befriended and helped by Benjamin Rush. Rhys's appreciation was such that he named his second son Benjamin Rush Rhees (the surname having changed after emigration).

Rhees began studying philosophy at Rochester, aged 16, in 1922. As a sophomore, he was expelled from his ethics class by Professor George M. Forbes, who had "found his questionings rude and insolent." This controversy, which occurred in February 1924 while Rhees' father was out of the country, was reported on the front page of The New York Times. Rhees would withdraw from the university and leave for Scotland soon after.

Rhees matriculated at the University of Edinburgh later in 1924 where he was particularly influenced by John Anderson. Rhees was influenced by Anderson's left-wing social philosophy amongst other things, a sympathy he maintained for the rest of his life. He graduated with a first-class honours degree in philosophy there in 1928.

That same year he was appointed assistant lecturer, under J. L. Stocks, at the University of Manchester. This was a position he held for four years.

He then studied with Franz Brentano scholar Alfred Kastil at the University of Innsbruck for a year.

In 1933, Rhees became a doctoral student at the University of Cambridge with G. E. Moore as his supervisor. Rhees impressed Moore, who once described him as his ablest student, although Rhees ultimately proved unable to submit a dissertation. Rhees had, at first, been put off attending Wittgenstein’s lectures by the behaviour of his acolytes, with Moore's encouragement, he began to do so from 1933, and continued to do so during subsequent terms until the summer of 1936. (Note: Contrary to Monk (1990) p.357, Rhees arrived in Cambridge before 1935, and contrary to Von Der Ruhr (2009) p.224, Rhees did not only begin to attend Wittgenstein’s lectures in 1936.)

Rhees returned to Manchester as a temporary Assistant Lecturer in 1937 then left academia to work as a welder in a factory until 1940. In the 1940s Rhees considered joining the Trotskyist Revolutionary Communist Party. Previously he had been sympathetic to anarchism, publishing articles in the anarchist newspaper Freedom ( which had been founded by Peter Kropotkin ).

H. O. Mounce, a one-time student and later colleague, records that until middle age Rhees was "a militant atheist" holding "in the manner of Nietzsche, that religion was both false and servile" but, by the 1950s, his attitude entirely changed though it is unclear why this change came about. Though never a member of any church, Rhees became interested in, and sympathetic towards, Catholicism. Fergus Kerr identifies remarks in Rhees' nachlass that suggest "fairly sustained Mass-going over a period" and an expressed preference for the Latin mass over 'the vernacular'.

== Career ==
With the departure of two of his colleagues for war service, A. E. Heath directly recruited Rhees to work alongside him from 1940 at the then University College of Swansea. (Note: "In 1940 Rhees answered an emergency call from Swansea. Professor A.E. Heath's colleagues W. B. GALLIE and Karl BRITTON had departed on war service.") Initially this was as a temporary assistant lecturer but Heath managed to secure him a permanent position. Rhees taught philosophy at the Swansea until 1966, when he took early retirement from the university to devote more time to editing Wittgenstein's works. He has been known mainly as a Wittgenstein exegete and for his influence on his philosophical colleagues at Swansea such as Peter Winch and R. F. Holland, and D. Z. Phillips (a one-time student of Rhees and later his literary executor). Although he would not accept advancement to a senior lectureship, Rhees is credited by Hsu with exercising "extraordinary influence on the shape of the philosophy department and on the kind of philosophy done there" and, indeed, for bringing Winch, Holland and J. R. Jones into the department.

Rhees developed the legacy left by Wittgenstein, at times emphasising religious and ethical understandings of Wittgenstein's work. He was Wittgenstein's personal executor and, together with G. H. von Wright and G. E. M. Anscombe, he was also his literary executor. In this latter role he was responsible for (co-)editing Wittgestein's Nachlass. Rhees' work in this role was not without controversy. His editorial work on the Philosophische Grammatik (1970) – translated by Anthony Kenny as Philosophical Grammar (1974) – was the subject of particular criticism.

Rhees was also influential in bringing the work of other philosophers to greater attention, notably for example the French philosopher, Simone Weil. For a time, he was visiting professor at King's College London, and with Winch and Norman Malcolm (a fellow student from his Cambridge years), formed a 'formidable triumvirate' of Wittgensteinans.

Rhees returned to Swansea in 1982 after the death of his first wife Jean Henderson. In 1985 he would re-marry to artist and designer (Margaret) Peg Smythies, the widow of Wittgenstein disciple Yorick Smythies and the ex-wife of Barry Pink, a friend of Yorick's who had also been a friend to Wittgenstein during the last year of his life.

At Swansea Rhees continued to teach, leading weekly post-graduate seminars from 1983 and, in the Cambridge tradition, welcoming a few students in 'at home' sessions for more detailed discussions of their research work. He also attended weekly meetings of the University's Philosophical Society that he had founded around 1940 (and which had counted Wittgenstein as chief amongst the eminent philosophers who addressed it in the years when Rhees was still a lecturer). It was also a forum in which students were expected to test and sharpen their philosophical wits. It was clear in these seminars that Rhees was not only devoted to exegesis of one of the finest thinkers of the twentieth century, but was, in fact, constantly absorbed in developing his own profound insights in philosophy. He was self-effacing of his capacities and had to be persuaded to accept an honorary professorship at Swansea where he had previously turned down promotion during his teaching career.

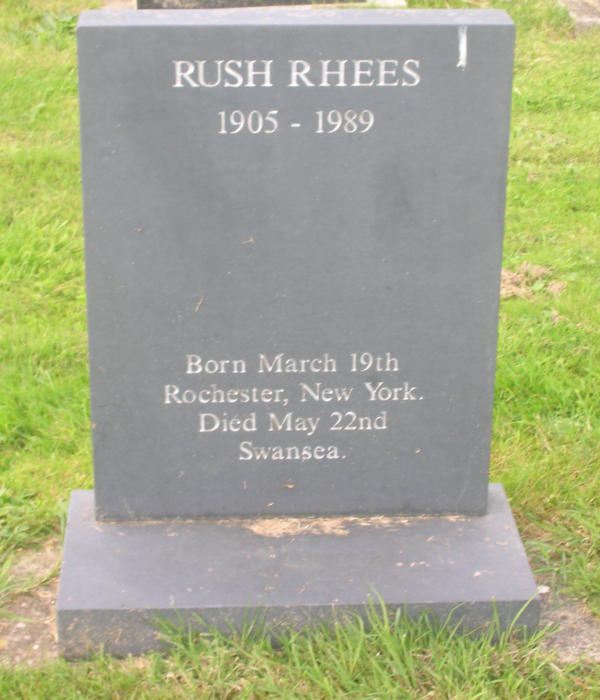
Gravestone

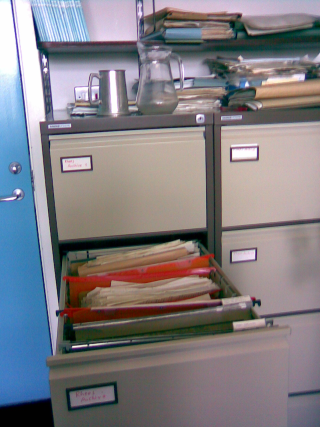
Archives at Swansea

Rhees died on 22 May 1989, and is buried at Oystermouth Cemetery in Mumbles near Swansea.

A volume of essays in Rhees' honour was published that same year. This collection was edited by D.Z. Phillips and Peter Winch, containing essays by Cora Diamond, Norman Malcolm, David Cockburn, H. O. Mounce, Raimond Gaita and others. Numerous posthumous collections of Rhees' published works, notes and manuscripts appeared under the editorship of D. Z. Phillips in the years that followed.

Rhees' papers are held by Swansea University Archives.

== Works ==
=== Books ===
- Without Answers (1969)
- Discussions of Wittgenstein (1970)

Nachlass works prepared for publication by D. Z. Phillips:

- Rush Rhees On Religion and Philosophy (1997)
- Wittgenstein and the Possibility of Discourse (1998, 2nd edition 2006)
- Moral Questions (1999)
- Discussions of Simone Weil (1999)
- Wittgenstein's On Certainty: There - Like Our Life (2003)
- In Dialogue with the Greeks (2004)
  - Volume I: The Presocratics and Reality
  - Volume II: Plato and Dialectic

=== Select papers and book chapters ===
- “Wittgenstein’s Builders” Proceedings of the Aristotelian Society, vol. 60, 1959, pp. 171–86.
- "Can There Be a Private Language?", Proceedings of the Aristotelian Society, Supplementary Volumes, Vol. 28 (1954) reprinted in Philosophy and ordinary language (1963).
- "The Tractatus: Seeds of Some Misunderstandings", The Philosophical Review, Vol. 72, No. 2 (Apr., 1963), pp. 213–220.
- "Some Developments in Wittgenstein's View of Ethics", The Philosophical Review, Vol. 74, No. 1 (Jan., 1965), pp. 17–26.
- "Symposium: Unanswerable Questions", Proceedings of the Aristotelian Society, Supplementary Volumes, Vol. 40 (1966), pp. 151–186.
- "Note on the Text", The Philosophical Review, Vol. 77, No. 3 (Jul., 1968), pp. 271–275.
- "'Ontology' and Identity in the Tractatus: Â Propos of Black's Companion", in Studies in the Philosophy of Wittgenstein, ed. Peter Winch, (1969).
- "Questions on Logical Inference", in Understanding Wittgenstein, ed. Godfrey Vesey (1974).
- "Wittgenstein on Language and Ritual", in Wittgenstein and His Times, ed. Brian McGuiness, (1982).

=== Edited works ===
(Co-)edited works by Wittgenstein:

- with G.E.M. Anscombe, Philosophical Investigations, (1953), G.E.M. Anscombe (trans.)
- with G. H. von Wright and G. E. M. Anscombe, Remarks on the Foundations of Mathematics, (1956), G. E. M. Anscombe (trans.), Oxford, revised edition 1978.
- The Blue and Brown Books: Preliminary Studies for the “Philosophical Investigations, (1958) with an introduction by Rhees.
- Philosophical Grammar, (1974), A. Kenny (trans.)
- Philosophical Remarks, (1975), R. Hargreaves and R. White (trans.).

Other edited works:

- Studies in Logic and Probability (1952), a selection of works by George Boole with a 'Note In Editing' by Rhees
- Ludwig Wittgenstein: Personal Recollections (1981) edited by Rhees.

*For a more complete list of major works published during his lifetime see "Rush Rhees: Main Publications" in Wittgenstein: Attention to Particulars (1989)

== Sources ==
- Erbacher, Christian (2023), "Wittgenstein and His Literary Executors: Rush Rhees, Georg Henrik von Wright and Elizabeth Anscombe as Students, Colleagues and Friends of Ludwig Wittgenstein", The Happy Afterlife of Ludwig W., Berlin, Heidelberg: Springer, pp. 31–79, doi:10.1007/978-3-662-66155-0_2 [revised version of "Wittgenstein and his literary executors. Rush Rhees, Georg Henrik von Wright and Elizabeth Anscombe as students, colleagues and friends of Ludwig Wittgenstein" (PDF). Journal for the History of Analytical Philosophy. 4 (3): 1–39. 2016.]
