= A. C. Ewing =

English philosopher (1899–1973)

A. C. Ewing FBA
- Ewing by Walter Stoneman (1956)
- Born: Alfred Cyril Ewing; 11 May 1899; Leicester, England
- Died: 14 May 1973 (aged 74); Manchester, England

Education
- Education: University of Oxford

Philosophical work
- Era: 20th-century philosophy
- Region: Western philosophy
- School: Analytic philosophy Analytic idealism Epistemic coherentism
- Institutions: University of Cambridge
- Main interests: Metaphysics, epistemology, ethics, philosophy of religion
- Notable ideas: Contemporary formulation of the coherence theory of justification The distinction between epistemological and metaphysical arguments for idealism

Alfred Cyril Ewing (/ˈjuːɪŋ/ YOO-ing; 11 May 1899 – 14 May 1973) was an English philosopher who spent most of his career at the University of Cambridge. He was a prolific writer who made contributions to Kant scholarship, metaphysics, epistemology, ethics, and the philosophy of religion.

== Biography ==
=== Early life and education ===
Alfred Ewing was born in Leicester, England, on 11 May 1899, the only child of Emma and H. F. Ewing. He was educated at Wyggeston Grammar School.

From his entrance to University College, Oxford, Ewing's early academic career was, as Russell Grice remarks, (Note: G. R. or Russell Grice who, as a research student in moral philosophy at Churchill College. worked under Ewing in the first half of the 1960s.) one of "almost unparalleled brilliance". Firsts in Classical Moderations and, in 1920, 'Greats' were followed by a Bishop Fraser Scholarship (Note: A scholarship intended to provide funds for a graduate wishing to study for a year after taking their BA, provided for by a benefaction from Agnes Fraser in memory of her husband James Fraser, the former Bishop of Manchester.) at Oriel College in 1920 and a Senior Demyship at Magdalen College in 1921 He was awarded the John Locke Scholarship in Mental Philosophy (now the John Locke Prize) the same year.

In 1923, Ewing was amongst the first Oxford students to be awarded a DPhil, his (revised) thesis being published as Kant's Treatment of Causality (1924). He served as a lecturer at Oxford 1924 –1925, He was awarded the Green Prize in Moral Philosophy in 1926. An expanded version of the essay for which he won the same was published as The Morality of Punishment (1929), with a short introduction by W. D. Ross.

=== Academic career ===
After holding temporary positions at Michigan University (in the summer session of 1926) and Armstrong College, Newcastle-upon-Tyne in 1927, he was appointed the same year, by A. E. Heath, as a lecturer in philosophy at University College, Swansea where he remained until 1931. There he would be reunited, as a colleague, with his former student at Oriel Richard Aaron, with whom he would remain a lifelong friend.

In 1931 he was appointed University Lecturer in Moral Science at Cambridge. (A. J. Ayer describes him as being 'imported' to teach the history of philosophy.) Ewing would later recall his "shock" on arriving at Cambridge to find "dominant not the influence of Moore, Broad, or Russell, but the influence of Wittgenstein" reporting that "the reaction his philosophy provoked in me was one of sharp antagonism".

He was awarded, the Cambridge D.Litt in 1933, at the remarkably early age of 34. The following year, Ewing published his extensive study Idealism: A Critical Survey, which was reviewed favourably by T. E. Jessop. It offers an early characterisation of a 'traditional account' of coherentist epistemic justification.

The late 1930s saw the publication of "Meaninglessness" and 'The Linguistic Theory' two "powerfully argued" papers that, Brand Blanshard contends, "must have contributed much to the disintegration of positivism".

He served as president of the Aristotelian Society from 1941 to 1942, and was elected a Fellow of the British Academy in 1941. He delivered the latter's annual Henriette Hertz philosophical lecture the same year. During the Second World War, Goebel records, Ewing turned his attention back to ethics with the publication of a series of articles that formed the basis of two works both published in 1947: The Definition of Good (an investigation primarily into problems of metaethics) and The Individual, the State, and World Government (a work on political ethics against the background of the European catastrophe and the danger of nuclear war). In a 1945 article for The Hibbert Journal he argued there were, as Brian McGuinness puts it, "no retributive, reformatory, or deterrent grounds, for making the terms of peace for Germany as a whole more severe than they would otherwise need to be". Wittgenstein wrote to Rush Rhees that Ewing’s article was "stupidish and academical but not unkind. It treated the Germans as prospective inmates of a reformatory school, managed on modern, humane principles. ... the Journal surprised me as being rather human."

Two visiting professorships took him to Princeton and Northwestern University in 1949. In the winter of 1950 Ewing attended the silver jubilee Indian Philosophical Congress in Calcutta and lectured at a number of Indian universities. He returned to India in 1959, to Mysore, to attend the joint symposium between the Indian Philosophical Congress and the International Institute of Philosophy, of which he was an active member.

At Cambridge where, as Ayer contends, Ewing was "not well treated", he was "eventually" made a reader in 1954. And, after many years of lecturing for the university, he was finally elected a fellow of Jesus College in 1962, Ayer thought that Ewing "was an able philosopher, a good scholar and a prolific writer" but one that "never caught the idiom ... largely foisted on Cambridge in the 1930s by Ludwig Wittgenstein." Philosophers Roger Scruton and Malcolm Budd were among the students tutored by him during the later years of his career.

=== Retirement and death ===
After holding a visiting position in Colorado in 1963, he retired from Cambridge in 1966 with an Honorary Fellowship from Jesus College. and moved to Manchester. But in 1967 he took a visiting position at San Francisco State College (Note: The visit being one recalled by Rudolph H. Weingartner.) and in 1971 such a post at Delaware.

He continued to write, working to complete Value and Reality: the Philosophical Case for Theism (1973) which was published posthumously. This was a work, Grice records, Ewing "had started writing for twenty-five years before its publication", and one "that had been his central concern for the last five years of his life".

Ewing died of a stroke in Manchester, England, on 14 May 1973. He left his papers, and Goebel reports, his body, to the University of Manchester. His eyes went to Manchester Royal Eye Hospital and the rest to Manchester anatomy department. To "the Moral Science Library in Sidgwick Avenue, Cambridge, he left his picture of Kant."

Ayer recalls Ewing "as naive, unworldly even by academic standards, intellectually shrewd, unswervingly honest and a devout Christian." Ayer also recalls teasing Ewing with the question of what he was most looking forward to in the afterlife, His immediate response being that "God will tell me whether there are synthetic a priori propositions."

Blanshard paid tribute to Ewing in both a journal obituary, and within his own Library of Living Philosophers Festschrift.

Thomas Hurka notes that "Grice's fine obituary of him is poignant, describing a man whose work was not appreciated at its true worth because of a change in philosophical fashion—and the arrogance of those who made the change—and irrelevant facts about his personality" but "that as parts of moral philosophy return to views like Ewing's his contributions are becoming better known."

== Philosophical work ==
Beaney reports in a footnote that Ewing's work has received the 'prima facie oxymoronic' description "analytic idealism". (In another brief note, Beaney directly connects this phrase to Ewing's 1947 work The Definition of Good). Goebel (2014) and (2010) suggests that Ewing characterised his work as "eine Art analytischen Idealismus" (a kind of analytical idealism). Goebel in both instances points to two pieces of intellectual autobiography, in which Ewing describes his attempt to combine what he takes to be the important insights of his idealist teachers with the methods of the early Cambridge School of Analysis around G. E. Moore and C. D. Broad.

He was one of the foremost analysts of the concept "good", and a distinguished contributor to justificatory theorizing about punishment.

Ewing was critical of the verification theory of meaning. He held the view that probability was not a quality of a thing, preferring to understand it in relative terms. Any probability statement without implicit or explicit reference to the relevant data upon which probability is based was considered meaningless.

Additionally he viewed self-contradictions to be meaningful. He said that although there is "a sense in which it seems reasonable to say that all self-contradictory sentences are meaningless" in that we cannot "combine" the meaningful constituents of self-contradictions in thought, there is also a sense in which they are meaningful. He therefore took issue with the thesis that "we cannot think the meaning of a self-contradictory statement as a whole, though we know the meaning of the separate words". A self-contradiction, according to Ewing, proposes that two ideas can be combined into one, which is a proposition. If self-contradictions were meaningless and a "mere set of words" then we would not be able to investigate or say if they were wrong, and it is this proposition that they can be combined which makes a self-contradictory utterance meaningful.

Ewing distinguished between two forms of philosophical analysis. The first is "what the persons who make a certain statement usually intend to assert" and the second "the qualities, relations and species of continuants mentioned in the statement". As an illustration he takes the statement "I see a tree", this statement could be analysed in terms what the everyday person intends when they say this or it could be analysed metaphysically by asserting representationalism.

== Works ==
=== Books ===
- Kant's Treatment of Causality. London: Kegan Paul, 1924.
- The Morality of Punishment. with Suggestions for a General Theory of Ethics, London: Kegan Paul, 1929. reprinted with a new preface, Montclair, N.J.: Patterson Smith, 1970
- Idealism: A Critical Survey. London: Methuen, 1934. (New edition, 1961.)
- A Short Commentary on Kant's "Critique of Pure Reason". London: Methuen, 1938. (New edition, 1950.)
- Reason and Intuition. London: Humphrey Milford, 1941.
- The Individual, the State, and World Government. New YorK: Macmillan, 1947.
- The Definition of Good. New York: Macmillan, 1947; London: Routledge, Kegan Paul, 1948.
- The Fundamental Questions of Philosophy. London: Routledge and Kegan Paul, 1951. (New edition, London: Routledge, 1980.)
- Ethics. London: English Universities Press, 1953. (New editions, New York: Free Press, 1965; London: Teach Yourself Books, 1975.)
- (ed.) The Idealist Tradition: from Berkeley to Blanshard; edited, with an introduction and commentary. Glencoe, Ill.: Free Press, 1957.
- Second Thoughts in Moral Philosophy. London: Routledge and Kegan Paul, 1959. (New edition, 2012.)
- Non-linguistic Philosophy. London: George Allen & Unwin, 1968.
- Value and Reality: the Philosophical Case for Theism. London: George Allen & Unwin, 1973

=== Papers and book chapters ===
- (1923) "Kant's Transcendental Deduction of the Categories" Mind 32 (125): 50–66
- (1925). "The Relation Between Knowing and its Object (I.)" Mind 34 (134): 137–153
- (1925) "The Relation Between Knowing and Its Object (II.)" Mind 34 (135): 300–310.
- (1927) "Punishment as a Moral Agency: An Attempt to Reconcile the Retributive and the Utilitarian View" Mind 36 (143): 292–305;
- (1929) "The Idea of Cause" Journal of Philosophical Studies. 4 (16): 453–466
- (1930) "Direct Knowledge and Perception". Mind 39 (154): 137–153.
- (1931) "The Message of Kant". Journal of Philosophical Studies. 6 (21): 43–55
- (1932) "A Defence of Causality". Proceedings of the Aristotelian Society. 33: 95–128, reprinted in Kennick, W. E. (ed.) Metaphysics: Readings and Reappraisals (1966) pp. 258–275
- (1933) "The Paradoxes of Kant's Ethics", Philosophy 13 (1938), 40-56 JSTOR 3747023
- (1935) "Mechanical and Teleological Causation", Proceedings of the Aristotelian Society, Supplementary Volume 14 , 67-82
- (1935) "Two Kinds of Analysis", Analysis 22(4): 60–64. JSTOR 3326782
- (1937) "Meaninglessness". Mind. 46 (183): 347–364. Excerpted in Edwards, Paul & Arthur Pap (eds.) A Modern Introduction to Philosophy (1965) [1957], an abbreviated form of this article contributed by Ewing, along with a brief 1961 addendum, can be found in MacGregor, Geddes & Robb, J. Wesley (eds.) Readings in religious philosophy (1962).
- (1937) "Some Points in the Philosophy of Locke" Philosophy, 12(45), 33–46. JSTOR 3747086
- (1938) "What is action?" Proceedings of the Aristotelian Society, Supplementary Volume 17
- (1939) "A Suggested Non-Naturalistic Analysis of Good" Mind 48 (1939), 1-22, JSTOR 2250596 reprinted in Readings in Ethical Theory, ed. Wilfrid Sellars and John Hospers (1952).
- (1939) "Intuitionism and Utilitarianism", Revue Internationale de Philosophie. 1 (4): 649–665 JSTOR 23932493
- (1939). "The Linguistic Theory of "A Priori" Propositions". Proceedings of the Aristotelian Society. 40: 207–244. reprinted in: H.D. Lewis (ed.), Clarity is not enough. Essays in Criticism of Linguistic Philosophy, London 2/1969, 147-169 (abridged version)
- (1940) "Ethics and Belief in God" Hibbert Journal 39: 4
- (1943) "Punishment as Viewed by the Philosopher" The Canadian Bar Review, 21
- (1944) "Subjectivism and Naturalism in Ethics" Mind, Vol. 53, No. 210, pp. 120–141, reprinted in: Sellars and Hospers (eds.), Readings in Ethical Theory, pp. 118–133 (1957)
- (1945) "The Ethics of Punishing Germany", Hibbert Journal 43: 2, 99-106
- (1947) "Kantianism" in Dagobert D. Runes (ed.) Twentieth Century Philosophy: Living Schools of Thought pp. 251–264
- (1949) "Philosophical Ethics and the Ethics of Practical Life" in Proceedings of the Tenth International Congress of Philosophy 1:470–472
- (1953)."Empiricism in Ethics". Proceedings of the XIth International Congress of Philosophy 10 pp. 78–82
- (1953) "The Necessity Of Metaphysics" in H. D. Lewis (ed.) Contemporary British Philosophy. Personal Statements. Third series.
- (1954) "Kant's Attack on Metaphysics". Revue Internationale de Philosophie. 8 (30 (4)): 371–391
- (1955) "Recent Tendencies in Moral Philosophy in Great Britain" Zeitschrift Für Philosophische Forschung, vol. 9, no. 2, pp. 337–347.
- (1957) "Recent Developments in British Ethical Thought," in C. A. Mace (ed.), British Moral Philosophy in the Mid-Century, London: George Allen & Unwin, pp. 63–95.
- (1961) "The Autonomy of Ethics" in: Ian Ramsey (ed.), Prospect for Metaphysics. Essays of Metaphysical Exploration, pp. 33–49
- (1967) "Conflicts of Duty", "Kant and Kantian Ethics", "Naturalistic Ethics" and other entries in: J. Macquarrie (ed.), The Dictionary of Christian Ethics
- (1968) "The Concept of Democracy" in: World Perspectives in Philosophy, Religion, and Culture
- (1968) "C.I. Lewis on the Relation Between the Good and the Right" in Schilpp, P. A. (ed.) The Philosophy of C. I. Lewis (The Library of Living Philosophers, vol. 13). Open Court.
- (1970) "Christian Ethics and Utilitarianism" in R. L. Cunningham (ed.), Situationism and The New Morality, New York, 152–167
- (1970) "Are all a priori propositions and inferences analytic?" International Logic Review 1, 77–87
- (1971) "The problem of universals" Philosophical Quarterly 21 , 207–216
- (1971) "The Significance of Idealism for the Present Day" Idealistic Studies 1 (1971), 1–12 doi:10.5840/idstudies1971112
- (1973) "Common Sense Propositions" Philosophy 48 , 363–379
- (1975) "My Philosophical Attitude" in Philosophers on Their Own Work, vol. 1 (in a series published under the auspices of the International Federation of Philosophical Societies.
- (1980) "Blanshard's View of Good" in Schilpp, P. A. (ed.) The Philosophy of Brand Blanshard (The Library of Living Philosophers, vol. 15).

*More complete publication details can be found online in Bernd Goebel's entry on Ewing for the BBKL.

== Sources ==
- Grice, G. R. (1975). "Alfred Cyril Ewing, 1899–1973" (PDF). Proceedings of the British Academy. 59 (1973): 499–513.
- Goebel, Bernd (2014). "Einleitung" ( (PDF)). Ethik: eine Einführung (in German). Archived from the original on 9 March 2024. (Introductory essay to a translation of Ewing's Ethics)
- Goebel, Bernd (2010). "Alfred Cyril Ewing". Biographisch-Bibliographisches Kirchenlexikon (in German). Vol. 31. pp. 414–424 [251–256]. ISBN 978-3-88309-544-8.
