= Dewi Zephaniah Phillips =

Welsh philosopher and theologian (1934–2006)

- Born: 24 November 1934; Morriston, Glamorgan, Wales
- Died: 25 July 2006 (aged 71); Swansea, Glamorgan, Wales

Education
- Education: Swansea University; St Catherine's College, Oxford
- Thesis: The language of talking to God: an investigation of some philosophical problems connected with prayer (1961)
- Academic advisor: Rush Rhees

Philosophical work
- Era: 20th-century philosophy
- Region: Western philosophy
- School: Analytic philosophy
- Institutions: Queen's College, Dundee; Bangor University; Swansea University; Claremont Graduate University
- Main interests: Philosophy of religion, ethics, philosophy of literature
- Notable ideas: A new role for the philosophy of religion: not in uniting theology and philosophy, but in recognising and analysing their different functions

Dewi Zephaniah Phillips (24 November 1934 – 25 July 2006), usually cited as D. Z. Phillips, was a Welsh philosopher and theologian. Phillips was a leading proponent of the Wittgensteinian philosophy of religion.

== Early life and education ==
Phillips was born in Morriston, Swansea, into a Congregational family on 24 November 1934. He was the youngest of the three sons of David and Alice Phillips. He attended the former Swansea Grammar School. Phillips studied philosophy at Swansea University from 1952 to 1958, where his teachers included J. R. Jones, R. F. Holland, Peter Winch, and, most importantly, Rush Rhees. From 1958 to 1961, he then studied at the University of Oxford, where he matriculated at St Catherine's College. While he was at Oxford he undertook a dissertation which Anglican philosopher Michael Foster initially tutored and which Rush Rhees later supervised. In 1965 his dissertation became the source for his first book The Concept of Prayer.

== Academic career ==
After his graduation from the University of Oxford, Phillips began his academic career in 1961 as an assistant lecturer in philosophy at Queen's College, Dundee. In the following year he became a lecturer. In 1963 he obtained a post as lecturer in philosophy at the University College of North Wales, Bangor.

In 1965 Phillips returned to Swansea University, to take up a lectureship in the Department of Philosophy. He was promoted to a senior lectureship in 1967. In 1971 he became its professor and head of department. He was also Dean of the Faculty of Arts (1982–1985) and Vice-Principal (1989–1992). His research interests included the philosophy of religion, ethics, philosophy and literature, Simone Weil, Søren Kierkegaard, and Ludwig Wittgenstein.

In 1992 Phillips was appointed Danforth Professor of Philosophy of Religion at the Claremont Graduate University in California, and thereafter divided his time between Claremont and Swansea where, in 1996, he became the Rush Rhees Professor Emeritus and Director of the Rush Rhees Archives and Peter Winch Archives based in Swansea University.

While at Swansea, Phillips made a substantial contribution to the University's reputation as a centre of Wittgenstein's philosophy, the Swansea School of Philosophy. Scottish Dominican Fergus Kerr noted: 'He became the best known of the "Swansea Wittgensteinians": philosophy understood as a kind of intellectual therapy in dark times rather than constructive theorizing; against prevalent aspirations and practice in the discipline, philosophical work as reminding ourselves of things we may overlook but cannot deny, rather than adding to the sum of knowledge by quasi-scientific discoveries.'

The Swansea school of thought is, perhaps, most thoroughly articulated as a positive research program in Phillips' own book on the subject, "Philosophy's Cool Place" (1999), in which he argues for the merits of "contemplative philosophy". On this view, philosophy is an activity involving both inquiries about reality and elucidations of the various contexts in which people live and speak. In contrast to the New Wittgenstein school of thought, philosophy is not limited to purely "therapeutic" treatments and the removing of philosophical confusion. Here, Phillips is primarily indebted to the work of Rush Rhees. For Phillips, what gives philosophy its unique disciplinary feature is its primary concern with the question of the nature of reality: "How can philosophy give an account of reality which shows that it is necessary to go beyond simply noting differences between various modes of discourse, without invoking a common measure of 'the real' or assuming that all modes of discourse have a common subject, namely, Reality?".

Phillips gave many endowed lectures during his tenure at California's Claremont Graduate University. These included the Cardinal Mercier Lectures (Leuven), Marett Lecture (Oxford), Riddell Lectures (Newcastle), McMartin Lectures (Carleton University, in Ottawa), Hintz Lecture (Tucson), the Aquinas Lecture (Oxford), and Vonhoff Lectures (Groningen).

== Philosophical ideas ==
=== Language game of prayer ===
Phillips argues that prayer is not primarily a request for empirical outcomes, as if addressing a cosmic agent who intervenes in natural processes. Such a view, he contends, misconstrues prayer's grammar, reducing it to a transactional mechanism akin to superstition. Instead, prayer is an expressive act, embedded in the believer's form of life, reflecting their relationship with God.

Phillips asserts that prayer's meaning consists in its role in religious practice, not in its causal efficacy. For example, petitionary prayer expresses dependence on God, articulating hopes or fears, while contemplative prayer fosters spiritual alignment. He rejects the notion that prayers must be answered in the sense of causal effect. He argues that this expectation distorts the purpose of prayer. Prayer, for Phillips, is a mode of self-reflection and moral orientation, not a tool for manipulating reality.

His conclusion emphasises that understanding prayer requires attending to its use in the language game of the religious community, not imposing external criteria of rationality. This clarifies prayer's significance as a practice of devotion, distinct from empirical or metaphysical claims.

== Cultural commitments ==
Outside philosophy and academia, Phillips was strongly committed to the Welsh language and the culture of Wales, including drama and poetry. He had books published in Welsh by Welsh publishers and he promoted the use of the Welsh language in local schools. He was instrumental in the founding of the Taliesin Arts Centre on the campus of Swansea University. He was honoured by membership of the Gorsedd Circle of the National Eisteddfod. He was a home supporter of the Swans, the colloquial name by which Swansea City Football Club is universally known.

== Personal life ==
From 1959 until 1961 Phillips was the minister of Fabian's Bay Congregational Church, Swansea where he had begun preaching in his native Welsh in his teens. He was licensed to preach but he was not ordained as a minister, which was his original intention.

In 1959 Phillips married Margaret Monica Hanford with whom he had three sons, Aled, Steffan and Rhys.

Phillips died of a heart attack in Swansea University Library on 25 July 2006. He was 71. From 2001 to 1996, when he retired, he was the Rush Rees Research Professor (Emeritus) at Swansea University. At the time of his death he held the Danforth Chair in Philosophy of Religion at Claremont Graduate University, California.

== Published works ==
Phillips was perhaps best known for his publications in the philosophy of religion. However, he also had published articles in the subjects of ethics, philosophy, literature and Ludwig Wittgenstein, and in Welsh language literature publications. He was editor of the journal Philosophical Investigations, the Swansea Studies in Philosophy and the Claremont Studies in the Philosophy of Religion. A selection of his publications is listed below.

=== 1960s ===
- The concept of prayer. Abingdon, Oxfordshire: Routledge. 2014 [originally 1965]. ISBN 978-0-415-73455-4.

=== 1970s ===
- Death and immortality. London: Macmillan and Co. 1970. ISBN 978-0-333-10270-1.
- Faith and philosophical enquiry. Abingdon, Oxfordshire: Routledge: Routledge. 2013 [originally 1970]. ISBN 978-0-415-65969-7.
- With H.O. Mounce. Moral practices Volume VI. Abingdon, Oxfordshire: Routledge. 2003 [originally 1970]. ISBN 0-415-31846-7.
- With Ilham Dilman. Sense and delusion. Londonj: Routledge & Kegan Paul. 1971. ISBN 0-7100-6935-9.
- Athronyddu Am Grefydd Cyfeiriadau Newydd. Llandysul: Gwasg Gorner. 1974. ISBN 0850882451.
- Religion without explanation. Oxford: Blackwell. 1976. ISBN 0631171002.

=== 1980s ===
- Dramâu Gwenlyn Parry. Caernarfon: Gwasg Pantycelyn. 1982. ISBN 1874786380.
- Through a darkening glass. Oxford: Basil Blackwell. 1982. ISBN 9780268018450.
- Belief, change and forms of life. Houndmills, Basingstoke, Hampshire: Macmillan Press. 1986. ISBN 978-1-349-07920-9.
- R.S. Thomas: Poet of the hidden God. Eugene, Oregon: Pickwick Publications. 1986. ISBN 978-0-915138-83-8.
- Co-edited with Timothy Tessin. Wittgenstein: Attention to particulars. UK: Palgrave Macmillan. 1989. ISBN 978-0-312-03499-3.

=== 1990s ===
- From fantasy to faith. Basingstoke, Hampshire: Macmillan. 1991. ISBN 0333529561.
- Interventions in ethics (Swansea Studies in Philosophy). London: Palgrave Macmillan. 1991. ISBN 0333524144.
- Wittgenstein and religion. Houndmills, Basingstoke, Hampshire: Macmillan Press. 1993. ISBN 0-333-52378-4.
- Introducing philosophy: The challenge of scepticism. Oxford: Blackwell Publishers. 1996. ISBN 0-631-20040-1.
- Philosophy's cool place. Ithaca, New York: Cornell University Press. 1999. ISBN 0-8014-3600-1.
- Co-edited with Timothy Tessin. Religion and Hume's legacy. Houndmills, Basingstoke, Hampshire: Macmillan Press. 1999. ISBN 978-1-349-27737-7.

=== 2000s ===
- Co-edited with Timothy Tessin. Kant and Kierkegaard on religion. Houndmills, Basingstoke, Hampshire: Macmillan Press. 2000. ISBN 978-0-333-79023-6.
- Recovering religious concepts. Houndmills, Basingstoke, Hampshire: Macmillan Press. 2000. ISBN 978-1-349-41139-9.
- Religion and the hermeneutics of contemplation. Cambridge: Cambridge University Press. 2001. ISBN 0-521-80368-3.
- The problem of evil and the problem of God. Minneapolis, Minnesota: Fortress Press. 2005. ISBN 0-8006-3775-5.
- With Kai Nielsen. Wittgensteinian Fideism?. London: SCM Press. 2005. ISBN 978-0334040057.
- Faith after foundationalism. Abingdon, Oxfordshire: Routledge. 2013. ISBN 978-0-415-82220-6.

=== 2010s ===
- Religion and friendly fire. Aldershot, Hampshire: Ashgate. 2004. ISBN 0-7546-4111-2.
- "John Locke (1632–1704)". Efrydiau Athronyddol. 67 (1): 1–15. 2004.
- The concept of prayer. Abingdon, Oxfordshire: Routledge. 2014 [originally 1965]. ISBN 041573455X.
