= Oswald Hanfling =

German-British ordinary language philosopher

- Hanfling in 1972
- Born: 21 December 1927; Berlin, Germany
- Died: 25 October 2005 (aged 77)

Academic background
- Education: Birkbeck College, University of London
- Thesis: Pleasure, Pain and Emotion (1971)
- Doctoral advisor: David Hamlyn
- Influences: Ludwig Wittgenstein

Academic work
- Discipline: Philosophy
- Institutions: Open University

Oswald Hanfling (21 December 1927 – 25 October 2005) was an ordinary language philosopher who worked at the UK's Open University from 1970, until his retirement in 1993. At the Open University, he, together with Stuart Brown and Godfrey Vesey, pioneered the teaching of philosophy to a higher-education standard via the means of BBC-broadcast radio and television programmes and written course books.

== Early life ==
Oswald Hanfling was born in Berlin in 1927. His parents were Jewish and when their business was vandalised on Kristallnacht in 1938, he was sent to England by Kindertransport and lived in Bedford with a foster family. After the Second World War, he traced his family to Israel, with the help of the Red Cross.

Hanfling left school at the age of 14 to become an "office boy". For the next 25 years, he worked in business, eventually running his own employment agency for au pairs. He picked up the English language through reading comics as a young boy.

== Education ==
Bored by business, Hanfling studied 'A' levels and then enrolled on a Bachelor of Arts in philosophy by correspondence at Birkbeck College. He gained a first, then embarked on a PhD, which he completed in 1971.

== Academic work ==
Hanfling was appointed as a lecturer at the Open University in 1970, and worked there until retiring as a professor in 1993. The primary influence on his thought was the later Wittgenstein. He was a regular attendee of the meetings of the British Society of Aesthetics and a contributor to their journal.

== Publications ==
=== Books ===
- Logical Positivism, Blackwell, 1981, ISBN 978-0-631-12853-3
- Essential Readings in Logical Positivism, (Editor), Blackwell, 1981, ISBN 978-0631125662
- The Quest For Meaning, Blackwell,1987, ISBN 978-0-631-15333-7
- Life and Meaning: A Philosophical Reader (Editor), Blackwell, 1988, ISBN 978-0-631-15784-7
- Wittgenstein's Later Philosophy, Palgrave Macmillan, 1989, ISBN 978-0-333-47575-1
- Philosophical Aesthetics (Contributing Editor), Blackwell, 1992 ISBN 978-0-631-18035-7
  - Hanfling's contributions being "The Problem of Definition', "Aesthetic Qualities", and "The Ontology of Art".
- Ayer, Weidenfeld & Nicolson, 1997, ISBN 978-0-7538-0182-6
- Philosophy and Ordinary Language: The Bent and Genius of Our Tongue, Routledge, 2003, ISBN 978-0-415-32277-5
- Wittgenstein and the Human Form of Life, Routledge, 2002, ISBN 0-415-25645-3

=== Papers ===
- "Hume and Wittgenstein", Royal Institute of Philosophy Lectures, Vol. 9 (1975), pp. 47–65.
- "Promises, Games and Institutions", Proceedings of the Aristotelian Society New Series, Vol. 75 (1974 - 1975), pp. 13–31.
- "Hume's Idea of Necessary Connexion", Philosophy, Vol. 54, No. 210 (Oct., 1979), pp. 501–514.
- "Does Language Need Rules?", The Philosophical Quarterly, Vol. 30, No. 120 (Jul., 1980), pp. 193–205.
- "Real Life, Art, and the Grammar of Feeling", Philosophy, Vol. 58, No. 224 (Apr., 1983), pp. 237–243
- "Scientific Realism and Ordinary Usage", Philosophical Investigations, Vol. 7, No. 3 (1984), pp. 187–205.
- "What Does the Private Language Argument Prove?", The Philosophical Quarterly, Vol. 34, No. 137 (Oct., 1984), pp. 468–481.
- "Can There Be a Method of Doubt?", Philosophy, Vol. 59, No. 230 (Oct., 1984), pp. 505–511.
- "How Is Scepticism Possible?", Philosophy, Vol. 62, No. 242 (Oct., 1987), pp. 435–453.
- "I heard a plaintive memory" in: (ed.) A. Phillips, Griffiths, Wittgenstein Centenary Essays, Royal Institute of Philosophy supplement 28 (1991).
- "What Is Wrong with the Paradigm Case Argument?", Proceedings of the Aristotelian Society New Series, Vol. 91 (1990 - 1991), pp. 21–38.
- "Loving My Neighbour, Loving Myself", Philosophy, Vol. 68, No. 264 (Apr., 1993), pp. 145–157.
- "Healthy Scepticism?", Philosophy, Vol. 68, No. 263 (Jan., 1993), pp. 91–93.
- "Changing the Subject", Philosophy, Vol. 70, No. 273 (Jul., 1995), pp. 448–452.
- "'Is', 'Ought' and the Voluntaristic Fallacy", Philosophy, Vol. 72, No. 282 (Oct., 1997), pp. 537–548.
- "What Is Wrong with Sorites Arguments?", Analysis, Vol. 61, No. 1 (Jan., 2001), pp. 29–35.
- "Learning about Right and Wrong: Ethics and Language", Philosophy, Vol. 78, No. 303 (Jan., 2003), pp. 25–41.
