= Zettel =

Zettel may refer to:

- Zettel (Wittgenstein), a collection of remarks on philosophy
- Zettel (Liechtenauer), a collection of verses on swordfighting

== People with the surname ==
- Charlene Zettel (born 1947), American politician
- Kathrin Zettel (born 1986), Austrian ski racer
- Sarah Zettel (born 1966), American science fiction writer
