= Remarks on the Philosophy of Psychology =

The Remarks on the Philosophy of Psychology are two posthumously published volumes of remarks pertaining to the philosophy of psychology written by Ludwig Wittgenstein.

The two volumes were first published in 1980, the first volume was edited by G.E.M. Anscombe and Georg Henrik von Wright and the second by von Wright and Heikki Nyman. The translations were made by Anscombe (vol.1), and C. G. Luckhardt and M. A. E. Aue (vol 2.). Not all of the material was new however, most of Zettel (1967) was material taken from Volume 1 of the Remarks and some of the remarks from the volumes had also been added to Part II of Philosophical Investigations (1953) which deals with many of the same themes.

The Remarks deal with topics such as volition, intention, and so on.

== Reception ==
Upon publication reception of the volumes was positive. A review in Ethics by Jeffrey Zekauskas noted that the volumes can clarify and aid in understanding Wittgenstein's Philosophical Investigations, adding that they are "significant additions to Wittgenstein's published corpus as well as to the contemporary literature in the philosophy of mind". Cora Diamond in The Philosophical Review said that there is "much of value in the two volumes" but considered it weak in comparison to Philosophical Investigations. Ian Hacking, in the New York Review of Books speculated that the volumes "may well turn out to be his most enduring secondary work, fair companions to the only books that Wittgenstein did cast into final form".

== See also ==
- Culture and Value
- Remarks on Colour
