= Peter Winch =

British philosopher

- Winch in 1984
- Born: Peter Guy Winch; 14 January 1926; London, England
- Died: 27 April 1997 (aged 71); Champaign, Illinois, U.S.

Education
- Education: St Edmund Hall, Oxford
- Academic advisor: Gilbert Ryle

Philosophical work
- Era: 20th-century philosophy
- Region: Western philosophy
- School: Analytic philosophy
- Institutions: University College of Swansea, Birkbeck, University of London, King's College London, University of Illinois Urbana-Champaign
- Main interests: Philosophy of social science, ethics, philosophy of religion
- Notable ideas: Application of Wittgensteinian philosophy to the philosophy of social science

Peter Guy Winch (14 January 1926 – 27 April 1997) was a British philosopher known for his contributions to the philosophy of social science, Wittgenstein scholarship, ethics, and the philosophy of religion. His early book The Idea of a Social Science and its Relation to Philosophy (1958) was an attack on positivism in the social sciences, drawing on the work of R. G. Collingwood and Ludwig Wittgenstein's later philosophy.

== Biography ==
Winch was born on 14 January 1926, in Walthamstow, London. He attended Leyton County High School for boys, before going up to St Edmund Hall, Oxford to read Philosophy, Politics and Economics. Following the outbreak of World War II, he served in the Royal Navy 1944–47, before graduating from the University of Oxford in 1949.

He was a lecturer in philosophy at the then University College of Swansea from 1951 until 1964. He was influenced by his colleagues Rush Rhees and R. F. Holland, both experts in the philosophy of Ludwig Wittgenstein. Alongside these two and D. Z. Phillips, Winch was one of "the Swansea Wittgensteinians", also known as the "Swansea School of Philosophy", which applied a Wittgensteinian framework to philosophy. In 1964, he moved to Birkbeck College, University of London, before becoming Professor of Philosophy at King's College London in 1967. During this period, he served as president of Aristotelian Society, from 1980 to 1981. In 1985 Winch moved to the United States to become Professor at the University of Illinois at Urbana-Champaign.

He died on the 27 April 1997, in Champaign, Illinois.

He was survived by his wife Erika Neumann and his two sons, Christopher and David.

== Thought ==
Major influences upon Winch include Ludwig Wittgenstein, Rush Rhees, R. G. Collingwood and Simone Weil. He gave rise to a form of philosophy that has been given the name 'sociologism'. He also bears responsibility for a small school of sociology that was prepared to accept his radical criticism of the subject.

Winch saw himself as an uncompromising Wittgensteinian. He was not personally acquainted with Wittgenstein; Wittgenstein's influence upon him was mostly mediated through that of Rush Rhees, who was his colleague at the University College of Swansea, now known as Swansea University, and whom Wittgenstein appointed as one of his literary executors. Winch's translation of Wittgenstein's Vermischte Bemerkungen (as edited by Georg Henrik von Wright) was published in 1980 as Culture and Value (with a new translation by Winch of a revised edition by Alois Pichler appearing in 1998). After the death of Rhees in 1989, Winch took over his position as literary executor.

From Rush Rhees, Winch derived his interest in the religious writer Simone Weil. Part of the appeal was a break from Wittgenstein into a very different type of philosophy which could nevertheless be tackled with familiar methods. Also Weil's ascetic, somewhat Tolstoyan, form of religion harmonised with one aspect of Wittgenstein's personality.

At a time when most Anglo-American philosophers were heavily under the spell of Wittgenstein, Winch's own approach was strikingly original. While much of his work was concerned with rescuing Wittgenstein from what he took to be misreadings, his own philosophy involved a shift of emphasis from the problems that preoccupied Oxford style ordinary language philosophy, towards justifying and explaining 'forms of life' in terms of consistent language games. He took Wittgensteinian philosophy into areas of ethics and religion, which Wittgenstein himself had relatively neglected, sometimes showing considerable originality. An example is his illuminating treatment of the moral difference between someone who tries and fails to commit murder and someone who succeeds, in his essay "Trying" in Ethics and Action. With the decline of interest in Wittgenstein, Winch himself was increasingly neglected and the challenge his arguments presented to much contemporary philosophy was sidestepped or ignored. In insisting on the continuity of Wittgenstein's concerns from the Tractatus through to the Philosophical Investigations, Winch made a powerful case for Wittgenstein's mature philosophy, as he understood it, as the consummation and legitimate heir of the entire analytic tradition.

Wittgenstein famously said that philosophy leaves the world as it is. Winch takes his ideas into regions that have strong moral and political implications.

== Works ==
=== Books ===
Authored

- The Idea of a Social Science and its Relation to Philosophy, London 1958.
  - 2nd edition, with new preface, London 1990.
- Ethics And Action, London 1972.
- Trying to Make Sense, Oxford 1987.
- Simone Weil, the Just Balance, Cambridge 1989.
- Spinoza on ethics and understanding, London 2020. ISBN 9781785275432.

Translated/edited

- Culture and Value, Ludwig Wittgenstein (1980, revised edition 1998). Both editions translated by Peter Winch.
- Studies in the Philosophy of Wittgenstein (1969). Edited, with an introductory essay, by Peter Winch.

=== Select articles and book chapters ===
- "Understanding a primitive society" 1964, American Philosophical Quarterly I, pp. 307–324, reprinted in Phillips, D. Z., ed. (1967). Religion and understanding. New York : Macmillan.
- "Ceasing to Exist" Proceedings of the British Academy 68, 1982 (1983)
- "Certainty and Authority". Wittgenstein centenary essays. Royal Institute of Philosophy Supplement. 28: 223–237.(1991)
- "Persuasion". The Wittgenstein Legacy, Midwest Studies in Philosophy. 17: 123–137. (1992)
- “Discussion of Malcolm’s Essay”. In Malcolm, N. Wittgenstein: a Religious Point of View, ed. Peter Winch. Ithaca, NY: Cornell University Press, 1994, pp. 95–135.

See also: works by Peter Winch at PhilPapers
