= Culture and Value =

Book by Ludwig Wittgenstein

- Cover of the 1980 English edition
- Editor: Georg Henrik von Wright
- Author: Ludwig Wittgenstein
- Original title: Vermischte Bemerkungen
- Language: German
- Subject: Philosophy
- Publisher: Suhrkamp Verlag
- Publication date: 1977
- Publication place: West Germany
- English publication date: 1980

Culture and Value is a selection from the personal notes of Ludwig Wittgenstein made by Georg Henrik von Wright. It was first published in German as Vermischte Bemerkungen in 1977 with the text being emended in following editions. Wright's second (1978) expanded edition was translated by Peter Winch and published in 1980 (and reprinted in 1984) as Culture and Value. Alois Pichler revised the work (producing a new German edition in 1994) and this was published with a new translation by Peter Winch in 1998.

The remarks are arranged in chronological order with an indication of their year of origin. Nearly half of them stem from the period after the completion (in 1945) of Part One of Philosophical Investigations.

At the end of the book appears a poem that was offered by Wittgenstein to the Hofrat Ludwig Hänsel, and it is assumed that he was its author.

Among the published notes particular attention has been bestowed on a passage where Wittgenstein enumerated people who, in his judgement, had influenced him: Boltzmann, Hertz, Schopenhauer, Frege, Russell, Kraus, Loos, Weininger, Spengler and Sraffa. Of note to literary scholars, the book also contains some of Wittgenstein's thoughts on Shakespeare, negatively comparing his depictions of character to those of Tolstoy.

Contained within the book are Wittgenstein's remarks on religion. Wittgenstein stated that "Christianity is not based on historical truth; rather, it offers us a historical narrative and says: now believe! But not, believe this narrative with the belief appropriate to a historical narrative, rather: believe, through thick and thin". For Wittgenstein you should "not take the same attitude to it as you take to other historical narratives...there is nothing paradoxical about that!" and that "The historical accounts in the Gospel, might historically speaking, be demonstrably false yet belief would lose nothing by this".

Wittgenstein observed a therapeutic impact of religion writing that "the Christian religion is only for the man who needs infinite help, solely, that is, for the man who experiences infinite torment" and is "a man's refuge in this ultimate torment". Religion is "the calm bottom of the sea at its deepest point, which remains calm however high the waves on the surface may be".

A further note dating from the same year (1931) witnesses the first occurrence of the term "family resemblance" in a discussion of Spengler's work.

The composer Steve Reich wrote a piece entitled Proverbs, which is set to a quote from the book: "How small a thought it takes to fill a whole life!".

== See also ==
- Remarks on the Philosophy of Psychology
