= Menna Gallie =

- Born: 18 March 1919
- Died: June 17, 1990 (aged 71)
- Occupations: Welsh novelist, translator and public speaker.

Menna Patricia Humphreys Gallie (18 March 1919 – 17 June 1990) was a Welsh-speaking Welsh novelist, translator and public speaker. In 1940 she married W.B. Gallie, a Scottish social theorist, political theorist, philosopher and a lifelong democratic socialist. She was a life-long Labour Party activist. She rejected feminism because she felt that it was ideologically hidebound. And she was cool towards what she perceived as "the more insistent parts" of its second-wave. From 1940 to 1990, while Gallie lived in Wales, she gave numerous talks to Neath Townswomen's Guild, Swansea University Women Graduates and Swansea Writers' Group. She is best known for her novels in the English language and as the first translator into English of the Welsh language novel Un Nos Ola Leuad by Caradog Prichard, the Welsh poet and novelist, as Full Moon (1973).

== Early life and education ==
Menna Patricia Humphreys was born in the mining village of Ystradgynlais, which was then in the historic county of Breconshire (now Powys), Wales. She was the youngest of the three daughters of William Thomas Humpherys, a carpenter from North Wales and his wife Elizabeth. She came from a Welsh-speaking family, which on her mother's side was socialist. Her mother was the secretary of the local women's section of the Labour Party. Her maternal grandfather had helped to found the Labour Representative Committee, which was launched at a conference that was held in London in 1900. And her uncle attended Ruskin College in Oxford before becoming a Labour Party County Councillor. Gallie was a life-long Labour Party activist. She rejected feminism because she felt that it was ideologically hidebound. And she was cool towards what she perceived as "the more insistent parts" of its second-wave.

Gallie's family moved to nearby Creunant in the County Borough of Nealth Port Talbot. Shortly afterwards she won a place at Neath Grammar School. From there she gained a place to study English at University College of Swansea.

== Married life ==
=== Swansea ===
While in Swansea, Gallie met Walter Bryce Gallie, a Scottish philosophy lecturer. They were married in July 1940, a month after she had taken her finals and five days before her husband left to serve in the Army during the Second World War, after which he left with the rank of Major and having been awarded the Croix de Guerre. During the war Gallie worked for the Inland Revenue in Llandudno and London. After the war her husband resumed his post as a philosophy lecturer in University College, Swansea and they moved, in her case returned to Ystradgynlais, where they had a son, Charles, and a daughter, Edyth. Gallie and her husband were committed to democratic socialism and were politically active.

In the autumn of 1949, A.D. Lindsay, the Master of Balliol College, Oxford, visited the Gallies in Swansea to tell them of his idea for a new university in Keele in North Staffordshire, the "University College of North Staffordshire" (the forerunner of Keele University) and his wish for Bryce to be its professor of philosophy. Bryce Gallie recalled that Lindsay met Menna:

and they had at once got on extremely well together. He had put out a great effort to paint Keele in glowing colours to her and had expressed the hope that, if we came, she would find in the lakes and woods of the estate (Note: The estate was the Keele Estate, the prospective campus of the new university.) consolation for the lost beauties of Wales.

=== Keele ===
The Gallies moved to Keele in the end of September 1950 for Bryce to take up the post as the "Professor of Philosophy" in the College. (Note: The jacket of Gallie 1960b states that Gallie 'was the first professor to be selected for Keele'.) He recalled that when he arrived his relations with Lindsay, by now the Principal of the College "were far from easy", the result of a combination of reasons, one of which comprised he husband described as the "political storms in the college grew more violent". He continued: "... Lindsay came to recognise that I was one of the handful of people he could trust .... This tardy recognition on his part helped our relationship, and during his last months he talked with me more and more. Quite as important, however, for the improvement in our relations was the part played by my wife". He explained:

Like many other women (I imagine) she had from the first regarded Lindsay with a mixture of love and awe, and as a source of authority on all moral and political matters. Her political loyalties, both because of family tradition and her experience of life, corresponded with his; (Note: Gallie 1960b, p. 16 alluded to Lindsay's family tradition with his observation that his father, T.M. Lindsay, gave 'his advice and assistance to ... many good and growing causes - to the Labour movement led by Ben Tillett and Tom Mann, to the problem of students' welfare in Glasgow [and] to the crofter agitation in the West Highlands', and, as King 1985 observed, he was a founder member of the Glasgow and West of Scotland Association for Women's Suffrage. Also, his mother, Anna Lindsay, was an activist and one of the founders of the Glasgow Association for the Higher Education of Women (Myers 2001), and whose name was said to be synonymous with the women's movement in Scotland.) (Note: Gallie 1960b, p. 21 alluded to Lindsay's experience of life with his observation that 'his welfare work in Wales, especially at the unemployed men's centre at Maesyrhaf'. Scott 1971, Lindsay's daughter, devoted one of her seventeenth chapters in the biography of her father to the subject of 'The Unemployed' during which she observed that he was closely involved in the centre from the beginning and gave it 'his ideas and his practical support' (Scott 1971, p. 150).) and his defence and justification of these loyalties seemed to her all that could be asked for in the way of philosophical wisdom.

Gallie continued, on a lighter note:

Her response to him, however, was certainly not one of mere reverence or adulation. On the contrary, she risked saying the most extravagant things to him - which he would amusingly carve down to a reasonable shape; she drew him out, she made him laugh, she produced her best cooking for him, she explained about her own - and retailed the glories of her grandmother's - home-made wines. Lindsay would shuffle through our kitchen, bend into our larder, sniff and peer at the huge vat filled with the red brew that was beginning "to work", then turn and solemnly assure my wife that in Scotland she would have been burnt as a witch had she lived there a century or so ago. On his last Christmas day we gave him a bottle of the best wine my wife had ever made, and at four in the afternoon he phoned to tell us that he and Bruce Williams had been drinking it after Christmas lunch and were finding it excellent. (Note: Lindsay and Williams were not the only people to benefit from Gallie's wine-making skills. Anna Świątecka (Sister Jadwiga OP) (2011), 'probably the most distinguished personality in all the first batch of students' (Gallie 1960b, p. 129), recalled her ‘getting tipsy on Menna Gallie’s elderberry wine’. "Our Keele". forever:keele. Keele University. 2011.)

=== Belfast ===
In 1954 the Gallies moved to Northern Ireland, where Bryce took up the post of Professor of Logic and Metaphysics at Queen's University Belfast. While there they lived in the estate of Castle Ward, an historic property outside Belfast. During their stay, Gallie and her husband stayed in New York for the academic year 1962-63, while he was the visiting Professor of Philosophy at New York University during the Cuban Missile Crisis. In 1965, Gallie gave a speech to the PEN society, the worldwide association of writers, in Bled, Slovenia (the former Yugoslavia) in her capacity as a delegate for Northern Ireland. (Note: https://archives.library.wales/index.php/pen-society Menna Gallie Papers (Archif Menywod Cymru / Women's Archive of Wales), Literary papers Talks and lectures PEN Society].)

=== Cambridge ===
The Gallies left Northern Ireland in 1967 upon Bryce's appointment as Professor of Political Science in Peterhouse, Cambridge. In his history of British intellectuals from World War II to Thatcherism, Scottish historian Colin Kidd referred to the 'suppressed cold war' which existed in Oxbridge after World War II 'between spouse and don, or between spouse and an different and demanding college' and that occasionally 'matters would erupt into the open'. He continued:

'In 1968 Menna Gallie, wife of the Cambridge professor of political science and fellow of Peterhouse W.B. Gallie, complained in the pages of the dons' own magazine that fellows' wives constituted an unacknowledged "guilty secret". Why she wondered, were wives made so unwelcome: "What the hell are the colleges trying to do. Break up our marriages? But she was conscious that in raising a complaint she was doing no more than "shaking a puny fist at a remote, indifferent universe of dons that sees me through a claret glass darkly".'

Shortly afterwards, Gallie also wrote a critical review of Germaine Greer's 1970 book, The Female Eunuch, which was published in the Cambridge Review. In it she took issue with her summation of Greer's conclusion that "Man is the enemy; so is the family and so is marriage" by citing "For God's sake hold your tongue and let me love", the first line of the poem The Canonization, by John Donne, the 17th century metaphysical poet.

File:Plaque on former home of the novelist Menna Gallie, Upper St. Mary's Street, Newport - Trefdraeth - geograph.org.uk - 5342034.jpgBryce retired in 1976. When he did so, the Gallies settled in their 'bolt hole' in Newport, Pembrokeshire, which they used when they were living in Ystradgynlais.

== Literary career ==
While in Northern Ireland, and at the age of 40, (Note: Gallie recalled that 'her role as wife and mother had not left much time to be me, not much time to remember or think about the idea that's long since slipped tidily down the sink with the dishwater or been wrung out hard with the nappies.') Gallie began her literary career with the publication of her first novel, Strike for a Kingdom (1959). (Note: Strike for a Kingdom is featured in the Literacy Atlas, an interactive online atlas of English-language novels set in Wales, see here.) Soon afterwards she wrote two novels in quick succession, Man's Desiring (1960), a campus novel, and The Small Mine (1962), an industrial novel.

Gallie wrote two novels about Northern Ireland. Travels with a Duchess (1968) was partly inspired by her visit to Dubrovnik in the former Yugoslavia (now Croatia) as the Northern Ireland representative at a Pen (Poets, Essayists, Novelists) International conference. You're Welcome to Ulster (1970) drew upon Gallie's experience there as an active member of its Labour Party.

Gallie found Cambridge "pretentious and hostile to women". Consequently, she was not inspired to write a novel about it. Instead, she wrote her 1986 novel These Promiscuous Parts about South West Wales. And she produced the first English translation of the Welsh-language novel Un Nos Ola Leuad, Full moon, by Caradog Prichard.

== Reviews, dramatisations and reprints ==
Strike for a Kingdom was shortlisted for a Gold Dagger Award. Australian academic Steven Knight (2019) observed that it was:

'received (sic) patronizingly by The Times Literary Supplement as "Fresh and beguiling from the land of her fathers" but is in fact an unsentimental account of politics and gender focusing on the 1926 general strike, set in a fictional version of Gallie’s native Ystradgynlais. ... Gallie strongly deploys a woman's voice - humour and gossip are central - and she emphasizes the effect of politics upon the social context, especially on women.'

In his review, Welsh historian Dai Smith described it as "both an engrossing detective novel and a social panorama of Cilhendre, a small Welsh village during the 1926 General Strike". In 2012 the novel was dramatised by BBC Radio 4 by Welsh author and dramatist Diana Griffiths. In 2020 it was reviewed by John Perrott Jenkins. In 2024 four Cardiff University Research Opportunities Placement Scheme (CUROP) students drew upon Strike for a Kingdom to create their artwork Motive and Opportunity. A reviewer described Man's Desiring (1960) as a novel with "warm and winning ways", a gentle comedy of contrasts about a Welsh man and an English woman at a Midlands university. The Small Mine (1962) tells the tale of a young collier's death in an industrial accident in Cilhendre, which featured in Strike for a Kingdom. Knight (2019) commented:

'In The Small Mine (1962), [Gallie] concentrates more on human relations in the context of a pit village than humour and politics. She thought this her best work, and Aaron shows how the central event is enriched with social symbolism: "This is the story not so much of an individual death as of a representative Valley community, and in particular its women folk, as they struggle to come to terms with the sudden catastrophic loss'.

In 2004 The Small Mine was dramatised for BBC Radio 4 by Diana Griffiths. Travels with a Duchess (1968) documents the holiday of a menopausal wife from Cardiff in former Yugoslavia which the narrator retrospectively described as "a terrible chronicle of debauchery".

Gramich (2017) commented: 'Gallie’s early novels Strike for a Kingdom (1959) and The Small Mine (1962) reflect a very South Walian socialist worldview, implicitly rejecting nationalist aspirations and yet charting carefully the ways in which Welsh workers and Welsh speakers had been systematically disempowered by an Anglocentric capitalist system'.

== Tributes ==
Plaque commemorating Menna Gallie on wall of her home in Upper St. Mary's Street, Newport / Trefdraeth

Gallie died in 1990 at her home in Newport. In 2005 Welsh historian Professor Angela John gave the Annual Lecture of the Women's Archive of Wales on the subject of "Place, Politics, and History: the life and novels of Menna Gallie" at the National Library of Wales, Aberystwyth. In 2006 Llafur hosted a day school in Ystradgynlais to examine the life and work of Gallie. In 2011 John dedicated Our mothers' land Chapters in Welsh women's history, 1830-1939 to Gallie. Also in 2011, Welsh historian Dai Smith included Gallie's Strike for a Kingdom in his 2011 Dai Smith's top 10 Welsh alternatives to Dylan Thomas.
