= Zettel (Wittgenstein book) =

Zettel (German: "slip(s) of paper") is a collection of assorted remarks by Ludwig Wittgenstein, first published in 1967. It contains several discussions of philosophical psychology and of the tendency in philosophy to try for a synoptic view of phenomena. It analyzes sense, meaning, thinking while speaking, behavior, pretense, imagination, infinity, rule following, imagery, memory, negation, contradiction, calculation, mathematical proof, epistemology, doubt, consciousness, mental states, and sensations. Most of the material in Zettel was taken from the manuscript that would later be published as Volume 1 of the Remarks on the Philosophy of Psychology.

Editions include a parallel text English/German edition, translated by Elizabeth Anscombe, edited by Anscombe and Georg Henrik von Wright, and first published by Blackwell (UK) and the University of California Press (US) in 1967. A 40th-anniversary edition was published by the University of California Press in 2007.
