= Casimir Lewy Library =

Library at the University of Cambridge

Coordinates: 52.2010°N 0.1091°E

The Casimir Lewy Library is the library of the Faculty of Philosophy at the University of Cambridge. The library is located in the Raised Faculty building on the Sidgwick Site, Sidgwick Avenue, Cambridge. It is open to all members of the university.

== History ==
The Moral Sciences (now Philosophy) Tripos was founded in 1861 at a time of rapid educational reform. Moral Sciences was interdisciplinary and included five subjects: moral philosophy, political economy, modern history, general jurisprudence and English law. In 1885, a small moral sciences (or moral science) library was created in one of the Literary lecture rooms in the Divinity School opposite St John's College.

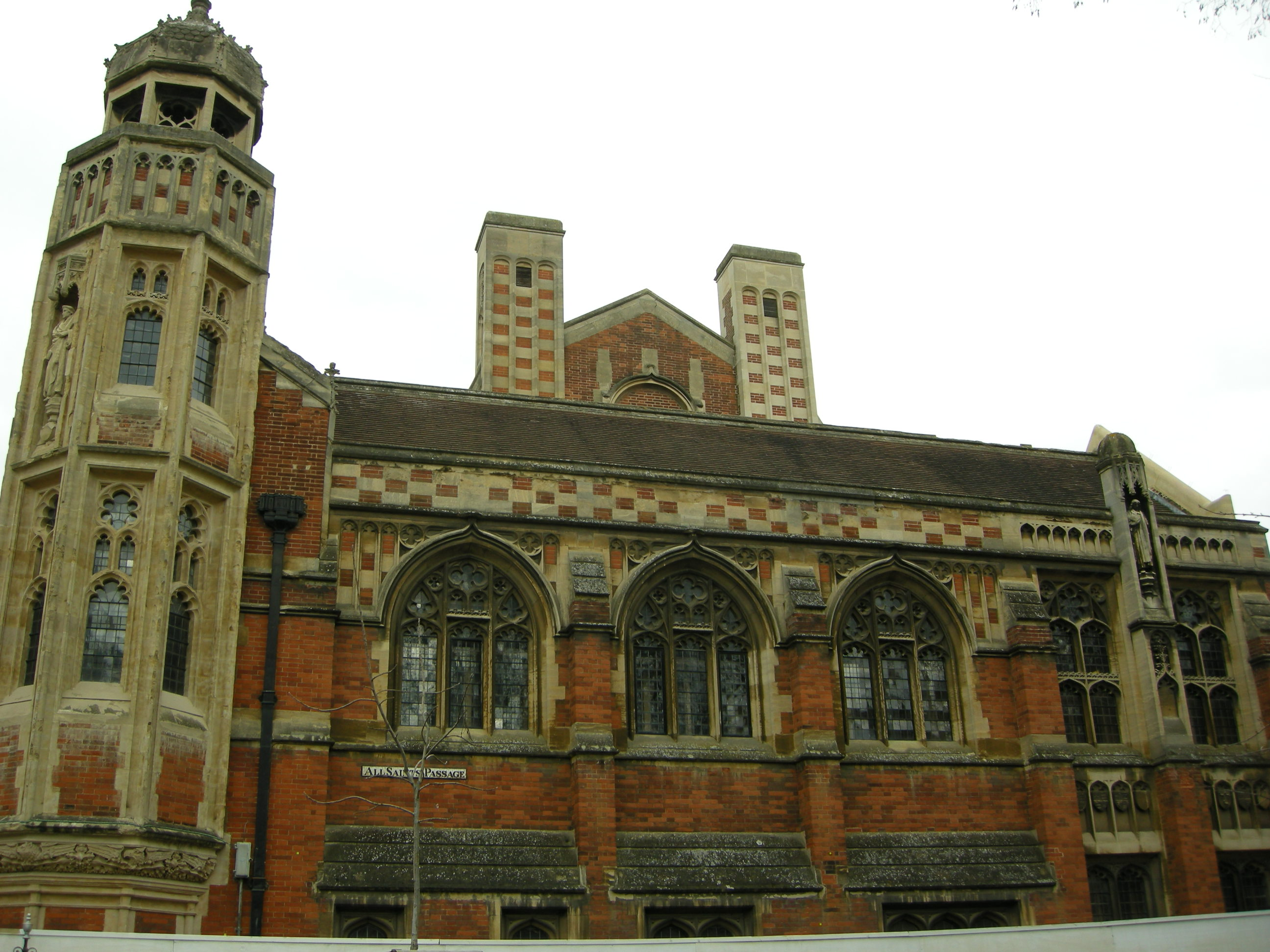
The former Divinity School on St John's Street

This was created by Alfred Marshall and Henry Sidgwick largely through the donation of their own books for student use. The library was mainly intended to be for students who were reading for the Moral Sciences Tripos but it was also open to members of the University and to students of Girton and Newnham Colleges. Application for admission had to be made to the Porter.

In 1910, the Arts School (University Lecture rooms) was built and provided accommodation for Moral Sciences and other departments.

Marshall died in 1924 and the majority of his personal library of books was given to the economics library (now the Marshall Library of Economics). In the 1920s, the Moral Sciences library was still located in the Arts School. The librarian at this time was Professor William Ritchie Sorley and there were about 400 volumes on philosophy and psychology.

From the 1930s to 1960s the Moral Sciences library was located in the Old Schools, Trinity Lane. Moral Sciences Club meetings were sometimes held there. In the 1950s the Sidgwick site was developed for the Arts, Humanities and Social Sciences subjects. In 1960 the Raised Faculty Building, designed by Sir Hugh Casson was opened. It housed the Faculties of English, Moral Sciences and Modern and Medieval Languages. The English and Moral Sciences libraries were co-located in the South Wing. In 1970 the Moral Sciences Tripos was renamed 'Philosophy'.

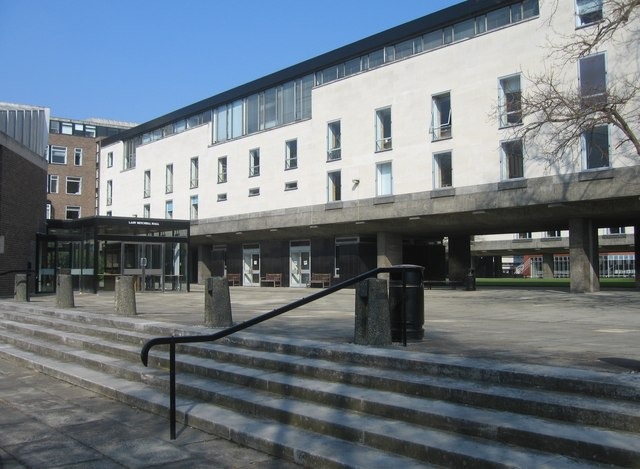
Raised Faculty Building - Sidgwick Site

In 1996 plans to refurbish the Raised Faculty Building began to take shape. After fundraising £6.5 million, the modernization and refurbishment of the Raised Faculty Building could finally go ahead. In January 2000, the English and Philosophy libraries moved into temporary accommodation. Several months later the two libraries moved back into the building and for the first time in 40 years they housed in separate buildings. The refurbished building was officially opened on 23 September 2000 by Onora O'Neill.

The newly refurbished Philosophy Library was renamed the Casimir Lewy Library and opened by Edward Craig on 23 September 2000. Casimir Lewy was a University Reader and Fellow of Trinity College who had been an inspirational teacher. Many of his former students made donations towards the refurbishment of the Library. It was located on the third floor of the Raised Faculty Building.

In 2006, the Raised Faculty Building had a second phase of refurbishment. The English Faculty and library moved into new premises on the Sidgwick site and the Casimir Lewy Library moved to its present location on the second floor of the Raised Faculty Building and reopened in September 2006

On 1 August 2014 the Casimir Lewy Library became an affiliated library of the University Library
