= Daniele Moyal-Sharrock =

Daniele Moyal-Sharrock is a philosopher, critic, and teacher. In 2007 she was appointed a professor of philosophy at University of Hertfordshire. She specialises in the works of Austrian-British philosopher Ludwig Wittgenstein.

== Biography ==
Moyal-Sharrock has written extensively about Wittgenstein's works post Philosophical Investigations, an era for which she has coined the term 'the third Wittgenstein'. She is also credited, along with Annalisa Coliva and Duncan Pritchard, with developing a new type of epistemology, 'hinge epistemology', which was developed from her efforts to share the insights within Wittgenstein's On Certainty.

She has completed a book-length study of On Certainty: Understanding Wittgenstein's On Certainty (Palgrave 2004/2007); and her other titles include Perspicuous Presentations: Essays on Wittgenstein's Philosophical Psychology; Hinge Epistemology (with A. Coliva); and F. R. Leavis: critic, teacher, philosopher. A further selection of her writings can be found in 'Certainty in Action: Wittgenstein on language, mind and epistemology' (Bloomsbury, 2021). She has provided the French translation of On Certainty (Gallimard, 2006), and is also the editor, of Reading Wittgenstein's On Certainty (Palgrave Macmillan, 2004) with William Brenner, and the editor of The Third Wittgenstein: The Post-Investigations Works (Ashgate, 2004).

Her published work encompasses topics including Wittgenstein, epistemology, and the philosophy of literature, and she authored a book with Constantine Sandis entitled Real Gender: A Cis Defence of Trans Realities. She has also interrogated the works of F.R. Leavis, Cora Diamond, Maurice Merleau-Ponty, Bernard Harrison and Kendall Walton.

Her publications explore Wittgenstein's contribution to the philosophy of language; epistemology; logic; ethics; religion; philosophy of psychology; culture; and aesthetics;, demonstrating how Wittgenstein's influence can extend beyond the discipline of philosophy but also to closely related fields such as psychology; linguistics; anthropology; sociology; education sciences; and cognitive science. She has also contributed to the discourse on the role of Wittgenstein's pioneering Enactivism in a stronger comprehension of the mind, action, language, and memory, showing how Wittgenstein facilitates a departure from looking at intelligence through a brain-centred lens and focusing on a person-centred approach to behaviour that focuses on ways of acting. She helps to debunk the reductive discourse of a quietist Wittgenstein which is in part responsible for a depreciation of interest by mainstream philosophy in him, instead helping to demonstrate the ways in which he can be considered an interventionist philosopher both within the field philosophy and for the neighbouring scientific disciplines.

Moyal-Sharrock has been president of the British Wittgenstein Society since 2007, and since 2012 has held the position of executive committee member of The Leavis Society.

== Selected publications ==
- Moyal-Sharrock, D., 2003, Logic in Action: Wittgenstein's Logical Pragmatism and the Impotence of Scepticism, In: Philosophical Investigations, Vol. 26, No. 2, p. 125-148
- Moyal-Sharrock, D., & Brenner, W. H., 2007, Readings of Wittgenstein's On Certainty, 2nd ed., London: Palgrave Macmillan
- Moyal-Sharrock, D., 2007, Unravelling Certainty, Readings of Wittgenstein's On Certainty, Moyal-Sharrock, D. & Brenner, W. (eds.), London: Palgrave Macmillan, p. 76-99
- Moyal-Sharrock, D., 2009, Wittgenstein and the memory debate, In: New Ideas in Psychology, Vol. 27, No. 2, p. 213-227
- Moyal-Sharrock, D., 2013, Wittgenstein's Razor: The Cutting Edge of Enactivism, In: American Philosophical Quarterly, Vol. 50, No 3, p. 263-279
- Moyal-Sharrock, D., 2015, Wittgenstein's Forms of Life, Patterns of Life and Ways of Living, In: Nordic Wittsgenstein Studies, October, p. 21-42
- Moyal-Sharrock, D., 2016, The Animal in Epistemology: Wittgenstein's Enactivist Solution to the Problem of Regress, In: International Journal for the Study of Skepticism, Vol. 6, No. 2-3, p. 97-119 23
