= W. B. Gallie =

Scottish social theorist, political theorist and philosopher (1912-1998)

W.B. Gallie
- Born: 5 October 1912; Lenzie, East Dunbartonshire, near Glasgow, Scotland
- Died: 31 August 1998 (aged 86)

Education
- Education: Balliol College, Oxford
- Thesis: The part played by symbols in the achievement of knowledge (1937)

Philosophical work
- Era: 20th-century philosophy
- Region: Western philosophy
- School: Pragmatism
- Institutions: University College of Swansea; University College of North Staffordshire; Queen's University, Belfast; Cambridge University
- Notable ideas: Essentially contested concepts

Walter Bryce Gallie (5 October 1912 – 31 August 1998) was a Scottish social theorist, political theorist, philosopher and a lifelong democratic socialist. In 1940 he married Welsh-speaking novelist Menna Humphreys, with whom he had a son, Charles, and a daughter, Edyth. He made notable contributions to philosophy in 1952 and 1956. In 1952 he had his book Peirce and Pragmatism published, which introduced the work of Charles Sanders Peirce to an international readership. In 1956 he introduced his concept of essentially contested concepts which argued that it is impossible to define certain concepts, for example, social justice, democracy, Christian life, art, moral goodness and duty, although it is possible and rational to discuss one's justifications for holding one interpretation over competing ones.

== Education ==
Gallie was born in Lenzie, East Dunbartonshire, near Glasgow, the son of an engineer. He was educated at Sedbergh School, a public school in Sedbergh, Cumbria. While there he attended a scholarship examination interview in Oxford for admission to Oxford University, in which he was examined by, among others, A.D. Lindsay, the Master of Balliol College, Oxford. Two years later, having passed the interview, he enrolled in Balliol College. In 1934 he obtained his Bachelor of Arts (First class honours) in Philosophy, Politics and Economics. In 1937 he received his Bachelor of Literature for his research into The part played by symbols in the achievement of knowledge.

== Swansea ==
In 1935 Gallie obtained a post in University College of Swansea as an assistant lecturer in philosophy. In 1938 he was appointed as a lecturer. In 1948 he was appointed as a senior lecturer. Later he met Menna Humphreys, like him a socialist, who was studying for an English degree in the University. They were married in July 1940, five days before he left to enrol in the Second World War.

Gallie served in the British Army from 1940 to 1945. He left the service with the rank of Major, having been awarded the Croix de Guerre. Philosopher R.A. Sharpe commented: 'The time he spent in the army evidently made an (sic) great impression upon him. He was a very out-going man. However, he never spoke of his wartime experiences, although he repeatedly returned to the philosophical aspects of war in conversation.' (Note: Gallie wrote several books about the Philosophy of war, see his publications from the 1970s onwards.) After the war, Lindsay told Gallie to come and see him, having read some of the essays that he had written, not on philosopy 'but on the three great poets – one of them Wordsworth – who had been [his] main intellectual sustenance during five years in the army.' When they met, Lindsay told Gallie about his 'North Staffordshire project' and asked him to send him copies of everything that he had published.

In 1948, Lindsay followed up his initial meeting with Gallie by visiting him and his wife in Swansea and expanded upon his 'North Staffordshire project'. He told them of his idea of an educational experiment, a new university in Keele in North Staffordshire, the 'University College of North Staffordshire' (the forerunner of Keele University), and he conveyed his wish for Gallie to be its professor of philosophy. In the following September, Gallie and his wife visited Lindsay, who was living with his family on the Keele Estate, the prospective campus of the new university. Gallie recalled that Lindsay 'had already told me that he wanted me to be professor of philosophy at the new college' but warned him 'that none of the chairs to be advertised would be in his gift, and that [he] should therefore have to apply in the ordinary way.' (Note: The jacket of Gallie 1960 states that Gallie 'was the first professor to be selected for Keele'.)

== Keele ==
In September 1950, Gallie and his family left Swansea for him to take up his new post, after him never having been 'much in sympathy with the Wittgensteinian influence which was beginning to dominate there'. British philosopher Christopher Hookway (2014) observed:

'In the 1930s, ... under the influence of Wittgenstein and Oxford philosophy, few British philosophers were sufficiently stirred by pragmatism or pragmaticism for Peirce to become a major topic for research.'

However, Lindsay was similarly disposed about Peirce. Gallie disclosed that, when he visited him in 1949, he told him about Peirce, on whom he was then working. In particular Gallie told Lindsay about Peirce's 'experimental Pragmatism', about which Lindsay 'didn't see anything very special'.

== Belfast ==
In 1954 Gallie became 'Professor of Logic and Metaphysics' at Queen's University, Belfast. (Note: Gallie's inaugural lecture, 'Free Will and Determinism Yet Again', was published as Gallie 1957.) While there, for the academic year 1962-63, he was also visiting Professor of Philosophy at New York University during the Cuban Missile Crisis. In 1960 he had published A new university: A.D. Lindsay and the Keele experiment, his homage to Lindsay.

== Cambridge ==
In 1967 Gallie left Belfast to become 'Professor of Political Science' at Cambridge University, where he was also a fellow of Peterhouse. While there, in 1970, and like Lindsay before him, he was elected President of the Aristotelian Society. (Note: See Gallie 1971 for his Presidential Address.) Gallie retired in 1976. When he did so, he and his wife settled in their 'bolt hole' in Newport, Pembrokeshire, which they used when he was in Swansea.

Gallie died in Cardigan, Ceredigion, on 31 August 1998. In 2000 an article was published in Philosophical Investigations which comprises extracts from his partly-autobiographical projected book Apologia Pro Opusculo Suo.

== Notable contributions ==
In 1952, while in Keele, Gallie had his book Peirce and Pragmatism published, which introduced the work of Charles Sanders Peirce to an international readership. (Note: The editor of Philosophical Investigations, in which Gallie's Apologia Pro Opusculo Suo (Gallie 2000) was posthumously published, observed: "his enthusiasm for the then largely ignored, fragmentary writings of Charles Sanders Peirce ... largely filled his years as a teacher at University College, Swansea". Gallie's Peirce and Pragmatism was published after he left Swansea.) A.J. Ayer, the English philosopher, provided the editorial foreword to the book. In it he credited Peirce's philosophy as being "not only of great historical significance, as one of the original sources of American pragmatism, but also extremely important in itself." Ayer concluded: "it is clear from Professor Gallie’s exposition of his doctrines that he is a philosopher from whom we still have much to learn."

In 1956, while in Belfast, Gallie had his paper "Essentially contested concepts" published in which he argued that it is impossible to conclusively define key appraisive concepts such as social justice, democracy, Christian life, art, moral goodness and duty, although it is possible and rational to discuss one's justifications for holding one interpretation over competing ones. Clarification of such concepts involves not the examination of predictive relations (as is the case for most scientific concepts), but rather, consideration of how the concept has been used by different parties throughout its history.

In 1960, while also in Belfast, Gallie had A New University A.D. Lindsay and the Keele Experiment published. In it he recounted the event which stimulated him to write it. One of the first intake of students, who he never taught and who he professed not to know at all well, approached him "with what she called a rather curious request":

Would [he] please soon write a book explaining for her again, and for all later students coming to Keele, what Lindsay had set out to do there; and she explicitly mentioned the kind of things he had said to the students on the opening day of the first term. She went on to say that she feared that she herself, like most of the original students, was beginning to forget these things, although she had it in her mind that they were immensely important and that all future students, as well as her own generation, should know about them. At the time I thought her rather naïve, even slightly sententious. But now I feel grateful as well as flattered that she spoke to me as she did, and I am glad that I promised, without any hesitation, to comply with her request as soon as I could possibly manage it.

Gallie concluded his book by revealing that he (also) wrote it "to fulfil a promise to a few of the thousands" who had met or heard Lindsay to write a portrait of him and by noting that "who knows, it may reach the feelings of some who knew him but mistrusted him, and may even persuade them, however belatedly, that they were wrong."

== Publications ==
Gallie wrote as 'W.B. Gallie'. He was a prolific author and the articles which are listed below are only a sample of his output. Works by Gallie, W.B. may be consulted for a complete listing.

Pre 1950

- 1939: "An Interpretation of Causal Laws". Mind. 48 (192): 409–426.
- 1949: An English School. London: Cresset Press.
- 1949: "The limitations of analytical philosophy". Philosophical Investigations. 9 (3): 35–43.

1950s

- 1952: Peirce and Pragmatism. Harmondsworth, Middlesex: Penguin Books.
- 1954: The Function of Philosophical Aesthetics. In 'Aesthetics and Language: Essays by W. B. Gallie and Others'. Edited by William Elton. Oxford: Basil Blackwell. Later republished in 1967. Accessed 28 February 2025.
- 1955: "Explanations in History and the Genetic Sciences". Mind. 64 (254): 160–180. doi:10.1093/mind/LXIV.254.160. JSTOR 2251465.
- 1956b: "Art As An Essentially Contested Concept". The Philosophical Quarterly. 6 (23): 97–114. 1956. doi:10.2307/2217217. JSTOR 2217217.
- 1956a: "Essentially contested concepts" (PDF). Proceedings of the Aristotelian Society. 56: 167–198.
- 1957: "What Makes a Subject Scientific?". The British Journal for the Philosophy of Science. 8 (30): 118–139. 1957. doi:10.1093/bjps/VIII.30.118.
- 1957: "The Lords' Debate on Hanging July 1956: Interpretation and Comment". Philosophy. 32 (131): 132–147. doi:10.1017/S0031819100051494. JSTOR 3749099.
- 1959: "Free Will and Determinism Yet Again". Philosophy. 34 (130): 275–276.(An Inaugural Lecture Delivered on 15 May 1957 at the Queen's University of Belfast which was originally published in 1957 by Marjory Boyd, M.A., Printer to the Queen's University of Belfast.)

1960s

- 1960: A new university A. D. Lindsay and the Keele experiment. London: Chatto & Windus.
- 1963: "The Historical Understanding". History and Theory. 3 (2): 149–202. Reprinted as Chapter 2 Narrative and historical understanding in 'The history and narrative reader'. Edited by Geoffrey Roberts. London: Routledge. Accessed 27 February 2025.
- 1967: "The Idea of Practice". Proceedings of the Aristotelian Society. New Series 68: 63–86. JSTOR 4544752.
- 1968: Philosophy and the historical understanding (Second ed.). New York: Schocken Books.

1970s

- 1973: "Wanted: A Philosophy of International Relations". Political Studies. 27 (3): 484–492. 1979. doi:10.1111/j.1467-9248.1979.tb01218.x.
- 1978: Philosophers of Peace and War: Kant, Clausewitz, Marx, Engles and Tolstoy. Cambridge: Cambridge University Press. ISBN 0-521-21779-2. (The Wiles Lectures which were delivered at Belfast University in May 1976.)
- 1979: "Kant's View of Reason in Politics". Philosophy. 54 (207): 19–33. 1979. doi:10.1017/S0031819100024852.

Post 1980

- 1983: How to Think about Nuclear Weapons: JR Jones Memorial Lecture. Swansea: University College of Swansea. 1983. ISBN 9780860760382.
- 1984: Prins, Gwyn (ed.). "The military and political background of the nuclear age". The nuclear crisis reader. New York: Vintage Books. ISBN 0-394-72768-1.
- 1991: Understanding War. London: Routledge. ISBN 978-0-415-05640-3.
- 2000: "Apologia Pro Opusculo Suo". Philosophical Investigations. 23 (2): 156–175.
