= Michael Nedo =

- Born: 1940 (age 85–86)
- Website: The Wittgenstein Archive Cambridge

Michael Nedo (1940-) is the director of the Wittgenstein Archive in Cambridge.

== Personal life ==
Nedo was born in 1940.

== Wittgenstein ==
Nedo developed an admiration for Wittgenstein while a physics student at the University of Tübingen. During the 1970s the trustees of the Wittgenstein estate awarded a contract to Nedo to publish a complete edition of the Wittgenstein manuscripts, although they had withdrawn their support by the time of the first edition in 1993. Since before 1997, Nedo has been the director of The Wittgenstein Archive, a privately funded organisation based in the city of Cambridge, England, aiming to publish Wittgenstein's work. The series of books created is known as the Wiener Ausgabe, the Vienna Edition, because of the location of the publisher, Springer-Verlag. Nedo was the subject of some criticism for the slowness of the publication rate and the competence of the work, although early editions of the Wiener Ausgabe attracted praise from The Times Literary Supplement and San Francisco Chronicle for elegance, beauty, and service to scholarship. Nedo's work has also been the subject of controversy in the German-language press.

Nedo co-edited a 1983 book, Ludwig Wittgenstein – Sein Leben in Bildern und Texten, with Michele Ranchetti, and in 2013 edited Ludwig Wittgenstein: Ein biographisches Album. Both books are albums of photographs related to Wittgenstein, linked by extracts from the writing of Wittgenstein and his circle. Ray Monk, in The New York Review of Books, estimated that 90% of the pictures and text in the latter book had also appeared in the former, but that no reason had been given for the removal of Ranchetti as a co-editor. In 2005, Nedo co-wrote Ludwig Wittgenstein: There Where You Are Not which combined a biographical collage by Nedo with photography by Guy Moreton and poetry by Alec Finlay.

== Editorial works ==
- Wiener Ausgabe: Einführung/Introduction, 1993, ISBN 3211824987
- Wiener Ausgabe: Band 1: Philosophische Bemerkungen, 1994, ISBN 3211824995
- Wiener Ausgabe: Band 2: Philosophische Betrachtungen, Philosophische Bemerkungen, 1994, ISBN 3211825029
- Wiener Ausgabe: Band 4: Bemerkungen zur Philosophie, Bemerkungen zur philosophischen, Grammatik, 2000, ISBN 3211825592
- Wiener Ausgabe Studien Texte: Band 1: Philosophische Bemerkungen, 1999, ISBN 3-211-83266-1
- Wiener Ausgabe Studien Texte: Band 2: Philosophische Betrachtungen, Philosophische Bemerkungen, 1999, ISBN 321183267X
- Wiener Ausgabe Studien Texte: Band 3: Bemerkungen, Philosophische Bemerkungen, 1999, ISBN 3211832688
- Wiener Ausgabe Studien Texte: Band 4: Bemerkungen zur Philosophie, Bemerkungen zur philosophischen, Grammatik, 1999, ISBN 3211832696
- Wiener Ausgabe Studien Texte: Band 5: Philosophische Grammatik, 1999, ISBN 321183270X
- Wiener Ausgabe: Konkordanz Zu Den Banden 1-5, 2000, ISBN 3211828591
- Ludwig Wittgenstein: There Where You Are Not, 2005, ISBN 1904772161
- Ludwig Wittgenstein – Sein Leben in Bildern und Texten, 2005, with Michele Ranchetti,
- Ludwig Wittgenstein: Ein biographisches Album, 2013.
