= David Hamlyn =

British philosopher (1924–2012)

David Walter Hamlyn (1 October 1924 – 15 July 2012) was a British philosopher.

== Life and works ==
He was a philosopher and long-serving academic at Birkbeck, University of London. He joined the Department of Philosophy in 1954 and led the Philosophy Department from 1964 to 1988. Educated at Oxford in classics, philosophy, and psychology, he authored several books on perception and the history of philosophy, and translated Books II and III (with passages from Book I) of Aristotle’s de Anima. Known for his commitment to Birkbeck’s mission of evening education and his care for colleagues and students, Hamlyn also served as vice-master and was made a Fellow of the College in 1988.
