= John Robert Jones =

Welsh philosopher (1911-1970)

J. R. Jones
- Jones in 1941
- Born: John Robert Jones; 4 September 1911; Pwllheli, Caernarfonshire, Wales.
- Died: 3 June 1970 (aged 58); Swansea, Wales
- Burial place: Pwllheli
- Occupation: Philosopher

Academic background
- Education: University College of Wales, Aberystwyth, Balliol College, Oxford

John Robert Jones (4 September 1911 – 3 June 1970), was a Welsh philosopher.

He was born in Pwllheli, and went to school there before going on to study philosophy at the (then) University College of Wales, Aberystwyth in 1929. He graduated with first class honours and did research for an MA there before going on to on to take his D.Phil. at Balliol College, Oxford.

In 1939 he returned to Aberystwyth to lecture in philosophy, and in 1952 was appointed Professor of Philosophy at the then University College of Swansea. In 1961 he was visiting professor at Chapel Hill University, North Carolina. On his return to Wales, he became more politically active, speaking out against the investiture of Charles, Prince of Wales in 1969, resigning from the Gorsedd of Bards in protest. He held his Chair of Philosophy until his untimely death in 1970.

As a philosopher, he was influenced by Wittgenstein and Simone Weil. His writings dealt mainly with three problems: the nature of the self, the nature of perception, and the nature of universals.

Jones died on 3 June 1970. at his home in, Swansea, his funeral service was held at Penmount Chapel, Pwllheli, on 6 June.

== Works ==
=== Welsh ===
- Yr Argyfwng Gwacter Ystyr (1964)
- Prydeindod (1966)
- A rhaid i'r iaith ein gwahanu? (1967)
- Ni fyn y taeog mo'i ryddhau (1968)
- Yr ewyllys i barhau (1969)
- Gwaedd yng Nghymru (1970)
- Ac Onide (1970)
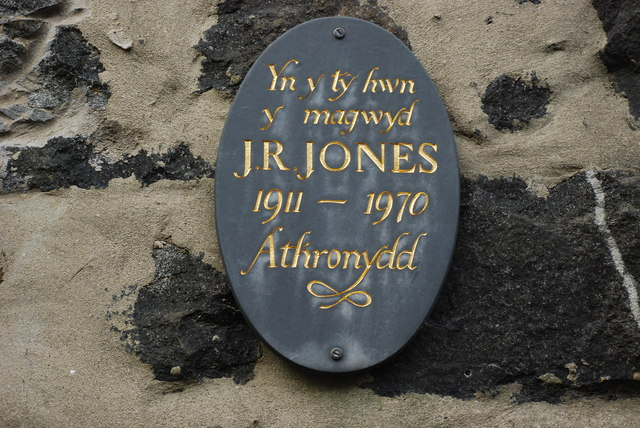
  Plaque on his house in Pwllheli: "J. R. Jones, philosopher, grew up in this house."

=== English ===
- "Are the Qualities of Particular Things Universal or Particular". The Philosophical Review. 58 (2): 152–170. 1949. doi:10.2307/2181389. ISSN 0031-8108.
- "The Self in Sensory Cognition". Mind. 58 (229): 40–61. 1949. ISSN 0026-4423.
  - ""Selves": A Reply to Mr. Flew". Mind. 59 (234): 233–236. 1950. ISSN 0026-4423. JSTOR 2250665. (Note: rejoinder to the reply by Flew.)
- "Our Knowledge of Other Persons". Philosophy. 25 (93): 134–148. 1950. ISSN 0031-8191.
- Religion as True Myth: Inaugural Lecture of the Professor of Philosophy (PDF). University College of Swansea. 1953.
- "Sense Data: A Suggested Source of the Fallacy". Mind. 63 (250): 180–202. 1954. ISSN 0026-4423. JSTOR 2251255.
- with Miles, T. R. (1956). "Symposium: Self-Knowledge". Proceedings of the Aristotelian Society, Supplementary Volumes. 30: 120–156. ISSN 0309-7013.
- "The Two Contexts of Mental Concepts". Proceedings of the Aristotelian Society. 59: 105–124. 1958. ISSN 0066-7374.
- "Love as Perception of Meaning" in: Phillips, D. Z., ed. (1967). Religion and understanding. New York : Macmillan.
- "The Inaugural Address: How Do I Know Who I Am?". Proceedings of the Aristotelian Society, Supplementary Volumes. 41: 1–18. 1967. ISSN 0309-7013.
- with Phillips, D. Z. (1970). "Belief and loss of belief: A discussion". Sophia. 9 (1): 1–7. doi:10.1007/BF02779105. ISSN 0038-1527. reprinted in Phillips, D. Z. (1993) Wittgenstein and Religion ISBN 978-0-333-58620-4.
