= Georg Henrik von Wright =

Finnish philosopher (1916–2003)

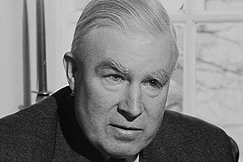
- von Wright in 1972
- Born: 14 June 1916; Helsinki, Grand Duchy of Finland
- Died: 16 June 2003 (aged 87); Helsinki, Finland

Education
- Education: University of Helsinki (MA, 1937; PhD, 1941); University of Cambridge (graduate student, 1939)
- Doctoral advisor: Eino Kaila
- Other advisors: R. B. Braithwaite; C. D. Broad; Ludwig Wittgenstein

Philosophical work
- Era: 20th-century philosophy
- Region: Western philosophy
- School: Analytic philosophy
- Institutions: University of Helsinki (1943–1961); University of Cambridge (1947–1951); Åbo Akademi (1968–1977)
- Doctoral students: Jaakko Hintikka
- Main interests: Modal logic, philosophy of action, philosophy of language, epistemology, philosophy of science
- Notable ideas: Deontic logic; Temporal logic; Myth of Progress

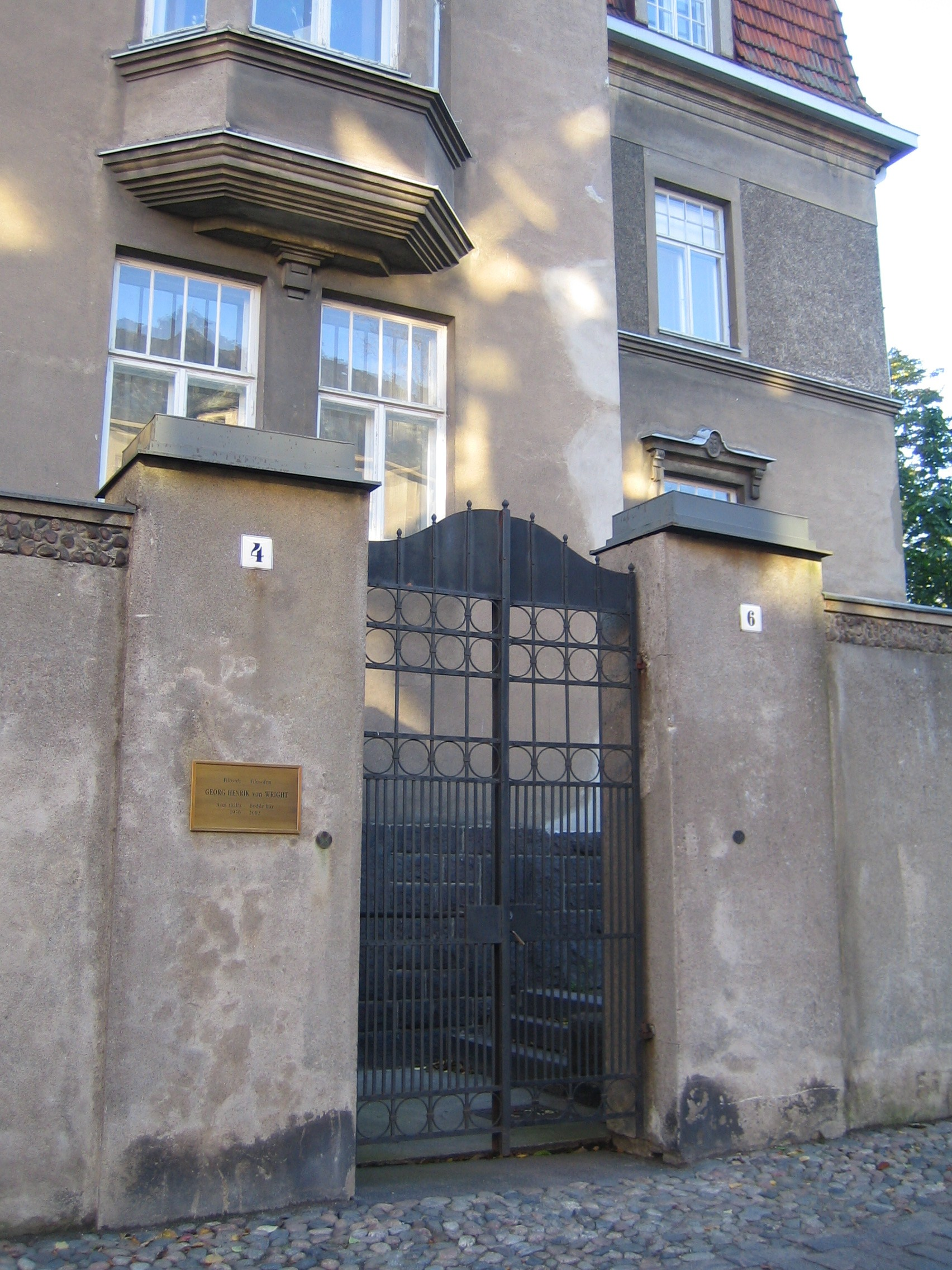
Von Wright's home on Laivurinkatu Street, Helsinki: a commemorative plaque marking his long-term residence was installed in 2006

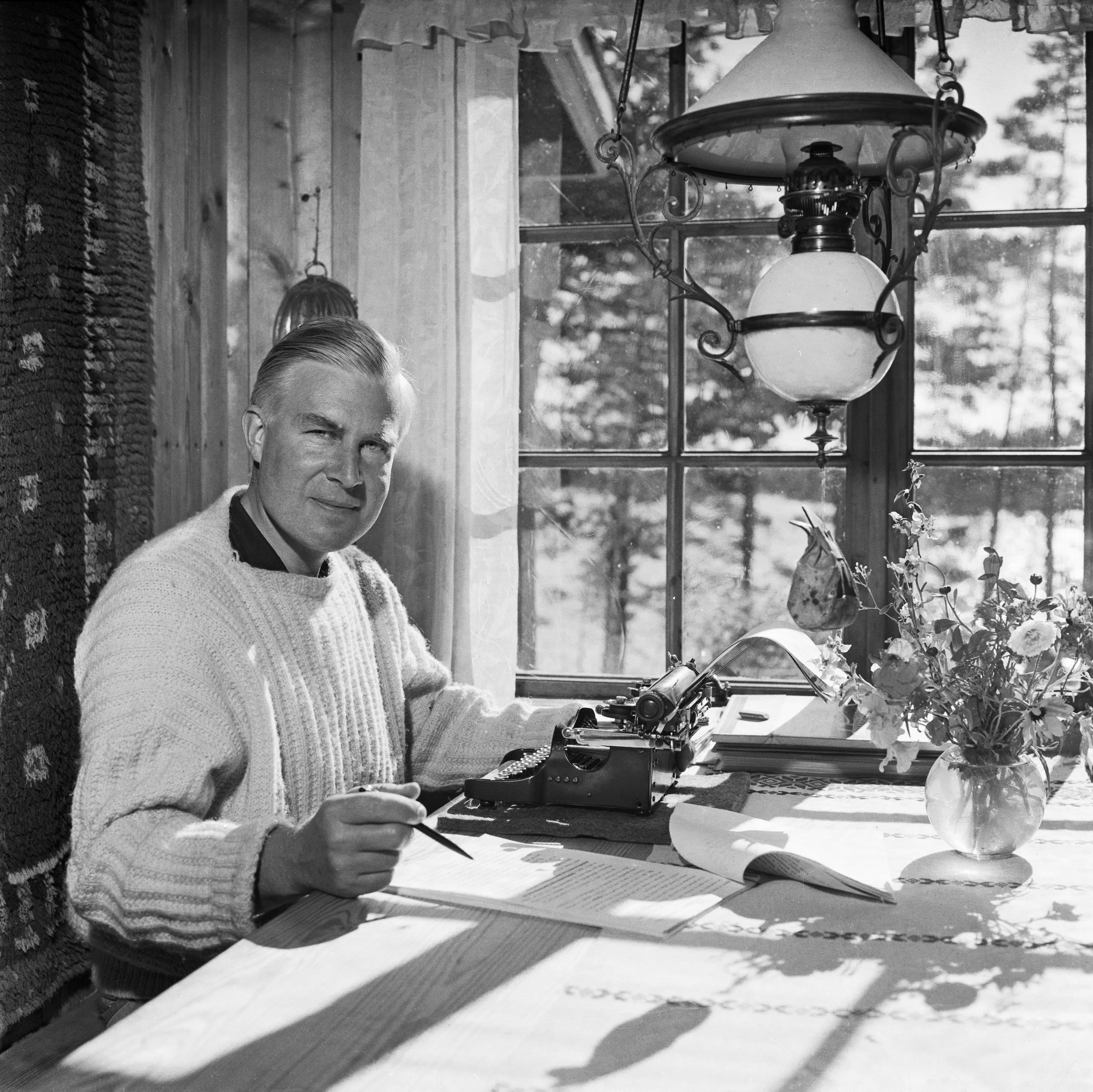
G. H. von Wright in 1961

Georg Henrik von Wright (Swedish: [ˈjěːɔrj ˈhɛ̌nːrɪk fɔn ˈvrɪkːt]; (Note: His obituarist in The Times claims that von Wright "used to tell British friends that the anglophone pronunciation was correct, since the name derived from a Scotsman" i.e. as rhyming with "bright" not “tricked.” The Institute for the Languages of Finland does however promote the rendering of the von Wright surname as "fånvrikt".) 14 June 1916 – 16 June 2003) was a Finnish philosopher. He is particularly known for his work in philosophical logic, especially deontic logic, his work on Ludwig Wittgenstein's later philosophy, and his work on moral pessimism, especially regarding the Myth of Progress.

== Early life and education ==
Georg Henrik von Wright was born in Helsinki, Finland on 14 June 1916 to Tor von Wright, a managing director, and his wife Ragni Elisabeth Alfthan. Von Wright was of both Finnish and 17th-century Scottish ancestry; the Scottish von Wright family had been raised to the Finnish nobility in 1772. He was an undergraduate at the University of Helsinki from 1934 to 1937, majoring in philosophy, history and political science while minoring in mathematics. His philosophy advisor was Eino Kaila, an affiliate of the Vienna Circle who introduced von Wright to logical empiricism. He was also particularly inspired by the lectures of Rolf Nevanlinna on probability and relativity.

As von Wright recounts, he visited Vienna in 1937 and met with Gödel and Viktor Kraft, but the Vienna Circle was already 'rapidly dispersing' by then and the Anschluss of 1938 put an end to his 'dreams' of studying there. Instead, it being customary for a Finnish postgraduate to spend some time at a foreign university, he went to Trinity College, Cambridge to work on his PhD thesis in March of 1939. There, he worked with C. D. Broad and R. B. Braithwaite and met G. E. Moore and Ludwig Wittgenstein.

He returned to Helsinki in the summer of 1939 and began working as a propagandist for Finland's World War II home front and then a military ballistics scientist. In 1941, he married Maria Elisabeth von Troil and completed his doctoral dissertation, titled The Logical Problem of Induction.

== Career ==
Von Wright became a lecturer at the University of Helsinki in 1943 and a chaired professor in 1946. He became known to the international philosophical community in the early 1940s via commentaries on his writings on the logic of induction by C. D. Broad in the journal Mind.

He returned to Cambridge in 1947 to lecture and attended Wittgenstein's lectures on psychology. Wittgenstein reportedly said von Wright was, as Risto Vilkko puts it, "the only one of his students who he had not spoiled with his education, the only one who did not attempt to imitate his way of thinking or his mode of expression." After Wittgenstein retired as professor at Cambridge in 1947, von Wright succeeded him in 1948, remaining until after Wittgenstein's death in 1951 and then returning to Helsinki. He was one of three scholars left Wittgenstein's literary estate, together with G. E. M. Anscombe and Rush Rhees. In 1951 he published A Treatise on Induction and Probability, which he regarded as the end of the phase of his philosophical career begun under Kaila's supervision in the 1930s.

Upon returning he began focusing on the development of deontic logic, writing the seminal essay "Deontic Logic" for Mind in 1951, and then moved on to the general philosophy of norms. He gave the Gifford Lectures in 1959 and used that material to write his books The Varieties of Goodness (1963) and Norm and Action (1963).

In the 1960s, he turned his attention to the logic of time and to organizational leadership roles. By the end of the 1960s, von Wright had begun to take an interest in political questions, having opposed the heavy bombing ordered by Lyndon B. Johnson during the Vietnam War in his "The War Against Vietnam" (1967). He became a member of the Academy of Finland in 1961 and its chairman from 1968 to 1970, remaining until 1986. He served as president of the Philosophical Society of Finland 1962–1973, president of the International Union of History and Philosophy of Science 1963–1965, and the Institut Internationale de Philosophie 1975–1977.

Traveling from Helsinki, he was a visiting professor at Cornell University in 1954 and a visiting professor at the University of California, Los Angeles 1964 and then a repeated visitor (the Andrew D. White professor-at-large) at Cornell 1965–1977. In 1973, interested in developing a Marxist humanism, he attended the Praxis School-organised Korčula Summer School in Yugoslavia. From 1968 to 1977, he was the chancellor of Åbo Akademi. He was the first Leibniz visiting professor to Leipzig University, for the academic year 1994–1995.

He published in English, Finnish, German, and Swedish, belonging to the Swedish-speaking minority of Finland. His career also included editorial work; he was editor-in-chief of Studentbladet in 1939, an editor for Finsk Tidskrift from 1941 to 1946, and an editor for Nya Argus from 1947 to 1960.

== Death ==
Von Wright died at his home in Helsinki on 16 June 2003. His library and papers were donated to the University of Helsinki and have become available to researchers via the National Library of Finland.

== Philosophical work ==
Von Wright's writings come under two broad categories. The first is analytic philosophy and philosophical logic in the Anglo-American vein. His 1951 texts An Essay in Modal Logic and "Deontic Logic" were landmarks in the postwar rise of formal modal logic and deontic logic. He was an authority on Wittgenstein, editing his later works and assembling the collection Culture and Value. He was the leading figure in the Finnish philosophy of his time, specialising in philosophical logic, philosophical analysis, philosophy of action, philosophy of language, and epistemology.

The other vein in von Wright's writings is moralist and pessimist. During the last twenty years of his life, under the influence of Oswald Spengler, Jürgen Habermas and the Frankfurt School's reflections about modern rationality, he wrote prolifically. His article "The Myth of Progress" (1993) questions whether our apparent material and technological progress can really be considered "progress" (see Myth of Progress).

== Awards ==
Von Wright was elected to an honorary fellowship at Trinity College, Cambridge, in 1983. In the last year of his life, he was awarded several honorary degrees, including one by the University of Bergen. He also received honorary doctorates from the University of Helsinki, the University of Innsbruck, the University of Buenos Aires, Stockholm University, the University of Turku, the University of Liverpool, St. Olaf College, and Lund University.

He was awarded the Swedish Academy Finland Prize in 1968. Other awards included the Wihuri International Prize in 1976 and the Swedish Cultural Foundation's Culture Prize in 1982. He received the Humboldt Research Award and the Academy of Sweden's gold medal in 1986. He won the Selma Lagerlöf Prize in 1993, the Tage Danielsson award in 1998, and the Critical European Prize in 2002.

== Publications ==
- The Logical Problem of Induction, PhD thesis, 31 May 1941
- Den logiska empirismen (Logical Empiricism), in Swedish, 1945. A Finnish translation by Hilppa Kinos, ''Looginen empirismi'', was also published in 1945.
- Über Wahrscheinlichkeit. Eine logische und philosophische Untersuchung (On Chance), in German, 1945
- An Essay in Modal Logic, (Studies in Logic and the Foundations of Mathematics: Volume V), L.E.J. Brouwer, E.W. Beth, and A. Heyting (eds.), Amsterdam: North-Holland,1951
- A Treatise on Induction and Probability, 1951
- "Deontic Logic" Mind, 60: 1–15, 1951
- Tanke och förkunnelse (Thought and Preaching), in Swedish, 1955. Translated into Finnish by Jussi Aro as ''Ajatus ja julistus'' in 1961
- Logical Studies, 1957.
- Logik, filosofi och språk (Logic, philosophy and language), in Swedish, 1957. Translated into Finnish by Jaakko Hintikka and Tauno Nyberg as ''Logiikka, filosofia ja kieli'' in 1958
- The Varieties of Goodness, 1963. (revised version of the second half of his 1959–60 Gifford Lectures, given at the University of St. Andrews)
- Norm and Action, 1963 (revised version of the first half of his Gifford lectures at St. Andrews).
- The Logic of Preference, 1963
- Essay om naturen, människan och den vetenskaplig-tekniska revolutionen (Essay on Nature, Man and the Scientific-Technological Revolution), in Swedish, 1963
- An Essay in Deontic Logic, 1968. Published with a bibliography of deontic and imperative logic
- Time, Change and Contradiction, (The Twenty-Second Arthur Stanley Eddington Memorial Lecture Delivered at Cambridge University 1 November 1968) Cambridge University Press. 1969
- Tieteen filosofian kaksi perinnettä (The Two Traditions of the Philosophy of Science), in Finnish, 1970
- Explanation and Understanding, 1971
- Causality and Determinism, 1974. (The 1972 Woodbridge Lectures delivered at Columbia University)
- Handlung, Norm und Intention (Action, Norm and Intention), in German, 1977
- Humanismen som livshållning (Humanism as an approach to Life), in Swedish, 1978. Translated into Finnish by Kai Kaila as ''Humanismi elämänasenteena'' in 1981
- Freedom and Determination, 1980
- Wittgenstein, 1982
- Philosophical Papers I–III, 1983–1984
  - v. I Practical Reason, v. II Philosophical Logic, v. III Truth, Knowledge, and Modality
- Of Human Freedom, 1985. (1984 Tanner Lectures at the University of Helsinki)
- Filosofisia tutkielmia (Philosophical Dissertations), in Finnish, 1985
- Vetenskapen och förnuftet (Science and Reason), in Swedish, 1986
- Minervan pöllö (The Owl of Minerva), in Finnish, 1991
- Myten om framsteget (The Myth of Progress), in Swedish, 1993
- The Tree of Knowledge and Other Essays, Leiden, Brill. doi:10.1163/9789004450554, 1993
- Att förstå sin samtid (To Understand one's own Time), in Swedish, 1994
- Six Essays in Philosophical Logic. Acta Philosophica Fennica, Vol. 60, 1996
- Viimeisistä ajoista: Ajatusleikki (On the End Times: A Thought Experiment.), in Finnish, 1997
- Logiikka ja humanismi (Logic and Humanism), in Finnish, 1998
- In the Shadow of Descartes: Essays in the Philosophy of Mind, Dordrech, Kluwer, doi:10.1007/978-94-015-9034-1 1998
- Mitt liv som jag minns det (My Life as I Remember it), in Swedish, 2001

Von Wright edited posthumous publications by Wittgenstein, which were published by Blackwell (unless otherwise stated):

- 1961. Notebooks 1914-1916.
- 1967. Zettel (Translated into English by G. E. M. Anscombe as Zettel).
- 1969. On Certainty.
- 1969. Briefe an Ludwig von Ficker. Salzburg: Otto Müller Verlag. Co-edited with Walter Methlagl
- 1971. ProtoTractatus—An Early Version of Tractatus Logico-Philosophicus. Cornell University Press; co-edited with B. F. McGuinness and T. Nyberg, with a historical introduction by von Wright.
- 1973. Letters to C. K. Ogden with Comments on the English Translation of the Tractatus Logico-Philosophicus.
- 1974. Letters to Russell, Keynes and Moore.
- 1977. Muistikirja 1914–1916. Finnish translation of Notebooks 1914–1916, co-published with G. E. M. Anscombe and translated by Heikki Nyman
- 1978 (1956). Remarks on the Foundations of Mathematics (German: Bemerkungen über die Grundlagen der Mathematik); co-edited with Rush Rhees and G. E. M. Anscombe.
- 1978. Zettel. Filosofisia katkelmia. Finnish translation of Zettel, co-published with G. E. M. Anscombe and translated by Heikki Nyman
- 1979. Yleisiä huomautuksia (General Remarks). Co-edited with Heikki Nyman.
- 1980. Remarks on the Philosophy of Psychology, Vols 1–2.
- 1980. Culture and Value (Revised edition 1998).
- 1982. Last Writings on the Philosophy of Psychology, Vols. 1–2, 1992.

Von Wright also edited extracts from the diary of David Pinsent, also published by Wiley-Blackwell:

- 1990. A Portrait of Wittgenstein as a Young Man: From the Diary of David Hume Pinsent 1912–1914. ISBN 0-631-17511-3.

For more complete publication details see "Bibliography of the Writings of Georg Henrik von Wright" (in Schilpp, 1989) and "The Georg Henrik von Wright-Bibliography" (2005).

== Sources ==
- Von Wright Obituary. The Guardian, 4 July 2003.
- G. H. von Wright. Encyclopædia Britannica. (Archived by Wayback Machine.)
