= Philosophical Investigations (journal) =

- Discipline: Philosophy
- Language: English
- Edited by: Mario Von Der Ruhr

Publication details
- History: 1978–present
- Publisher: Wiley-Blackwell
- Frequency: Quarterly

Standard abbreviations
- ISO 4: Philos. Investig.

Indexing
- ISSN: 0190-0536 (print); 1467-9205 (web)

Links
- Journal homepage; Online access

Philosophical Investigations is a quarterly peer-reviewed academic journal which features articles, discussion, and literature reviews from every field of philosophy. Special issues are occasionally published on topics of current philosophical interest. It is the official journal of the British Wittgenstein Society, which aims to ensure that Ludwig Wittgenstein's philosophy continues to play a fertile and creative role in 21st century thought. Since 2022 Mario Von Der Ruhr has been its editor-in-chief.
