= R. F. Holland =

English philosopher (1923–2013)

- Born: Roy Fraser Holland; 18 March 1923; Manchester, England
- Died: 5 March 2013 (aged 89)

Roy Fraser Holland (18 March 1923 – 5 March 2013) was a philosopher who was a part of the group "The Swansea Wittgensteinians", or "Swansea School", in the philosophy of religion which sought to interpret religion in light of the works of Ludwig Wittgenstein.

== Biography ==
He attended Manchester Grammar School from 1934 to 1941, and later went on to study at University College, Oxford through a scholarship. In 1942, he joined the army and served as a regimental officer across Africa and South-East Asia. He later returned to Oxford in 1948 and graduated in Literae Humaniores.

He taught at the University College Swansea from 1950 to 1965, later being appointed as Professor of Philosophy at the University of Leeds, here he supervised the PhD thesis of Raimond Gaita. He served as Professor and Chair of the Department of Philosophy at Leeds from 1967 till 1983.

From 1981 to 1982 he served as President of the Aristotelian Society, and also as President of the Mind Association. He was also a council member of the Royal Institute of Philosophy and on the editorial board of Philosophical Investigations.

Holland edited the book series Studies in Philosophical Psychology. He published only one book in his lifetime Against Empiricism (1980), a collection of fifteen of his essays. In the book he critiques what he considers a philosophy of education that originates from an empiricist view of the world.

== Miracles ==
In philosophy the word miracle usually refers to an event caused by God or one that cannot happen within the laws of nature. While this view is accepted by philosophers such as David Hume, Holland argued in his article The Miraculous that this definition is inadequate because it is too restrictive. Holland argues that a miracle is when an event contrary to usual experience occurs, and this occurrence has such human significance that it is interpreted to be miraculous. This means that a miracle can be deemed one even if there is a known natural explanation.

Holland gives an example of a boy playing with a toy motor-car on a railway crossing. A wheel of the toy gets stuck in the tracks, and a train is approaching from a curve, making it impossible for the driver to see the boy and stop before hitting him. The boy's mother sees him from their house, and hears the train approaching, but is too far away to do anything. Nevertheless, the train's brakes apply and it stops just before hitting the boy. Having seen this, the mother believes it to be a miracle, however the brakes had applied automatically because the driver passed out from circumstances unrelated to seeing the boy on the crossing. While this event has a natural explanation, the mother will continue to believe it was a miracle.

== Bibliography ==
=== Books ===
- Against Empiricism: On Education, Epistemology and Value. Bloomsbury Academic. 1980. ISBN 978-0389200536.

=== Papers ===
- The Empiricist Theory of Memory (1954) in Mind, Vol. 63, No. 252, pp. 464-486.
- Morality and the Two Worlds Concept (1955) in Proceedings of the Aristotelian Society, New Series, Vol. 56, pp. 45-62.
- Religious Discourse and Theological Discourse (1956) in Australasian Journal of Philosophy, Vol. 34, No. 3, pp. 147–163.
- On Making Sense of a Philosophical Fragment (1956) in The Classical Quarterly, Vol. 6, No. 3-4, pp. 215-220.
- Modern Philosophers Consider Religion: A Reply (1958) in Australasian Journal of Philosophy, Vol. 36 No. 3, pp. 208–209.
- The Miraculous (1965) in American Philosophical Quarterly, Vol. 2, No. 1 (Jan., 1965), pp. 43-51.
- For Ever? (1974) in The Philosophical Quarterly, Vol. 24, No. 94, pp. 1-16.
- Philosophers Discuss Education (1977) in Philosophy, Vol. 52, No. 199, pp. 63-81.
- Euthyphro (1981) in Proceedings of the Aristotelian Society, New Series, Vol. 82, pp. 1-15.
- Hidden Complication and True Belief (1985), in Proceedings of the Aristotelian Society, Supplementary Volumes, Vol. 59, pp. 1-16.
- Not Bending the Knee (1990) in Philosophical Investigations Vol. 13 No. 1., pp. 18-30.
- Fanciful Fates (1997) in Philosophical Investigations, Vol. 20 No. 3., pp. 246–256.
