= Socialist Studies =

Socialist Studies may refer to:

- Socialist Studies (1981), a series of publications by the Socialist Labor Party
- Socialist Studies (1989), a quarterly Marxist periodical and the London-based group which publishes it
- Socialist Studies (book series), an academic book series published annually by the Society for Socialist Studies
- Socialist Studies (Committee on Socialist Studies journal), the journal of the Committee on Socialist Studies
- Socialist Studies (Society for Socialist Studies journal), a peer-reviewed, interdisciplinary journal published by the Society for Socialist Studies
- Socialist Studies, a quarterly magazine published by the United Socialist Party (UK)
- Socialist Studies Bulletin, an interdisciplinary journal published by the Society for Socialist Studies
