= Mark Neocleous =

British critical theorist

- Born: 1964 (age 61–62)
- Occupations: Political scientist, academic

Academic background
- Education: City University (BSc); Birkbeck College (MSc); Middlesex University (PhD)
- Thesis: State, Power, Administration: Marxist and Foucauldian Perspectives on State Development in Britain 1832–1918 (1995)
- Doctoral advisor: Peter Osborne

Academic work
- Discipline: Philosophy
- Sub-discipline: Critical theory Political philosophy Critical security studies
- School or tradition: Continental philosophy
- Institutions: Brunel University (1994–)

Mark Neocleous (born 1964) is a British political philosopher and critical theorist, notable for his radical critique of the concept of security.

== Biography ==
Neocleous graduated with a BSc in philosophy and sociology from London's City University and with an MSc in politics and sociology from Birkbeck College. He defended his PhD dissertation in philosophy on State, Power, Administration: Marxist and Foucauldian Perspectives on State Development in Britain 1832–1918, written under the guidance of Peter Osborne at Middlesex University's Centre for Research in Modern European Philosophy (CRMEP), in 1995.

He joined the Department of Government at Brunel University in 1994 and taught politics there. He later moved to the Department of Social and Political Sciences at Brunel, where he holds the position of Professor of the Critique of Political Economy.

He was a member of the editorial collective of Radical Philosophy from 1998 to 2016, and of the external advisory board of Red Quill Books.

== Work ==
Neocleous presents his research interests as focused on "questions of state and capital, especially as they pertain to police, security, and war". He has accordingly been described as a "political theorist of state and security power". However, he has explicitly criticised the "specialization-induced intellectual poverty" and stated that his work was "not situated intellectually within any particular discipline".

Neocleous developed an interest in the concept of security as a political theorist studying the state and police power by following Karl Marx's claim that "Security is the supreme social concept of bourgeois society, the concept of police". In his 2008 first book on the subject, he argued that (in)security is fundamental to the liberal political order, linking its emergence to the creation of the modern market society and working class through enclosure in 17th-century Britain. He denied that a progressive reading of security was possible, and called for "eschewing the logic of security altogether", adopting a position more radical than the critical security scholars. He has proposed to understand police power as a "means of preserving and fabricating capitalist order".

== Books ==
- Administering Civil Society: Towards a Theory of State Power, Basingstoke: Macmillan, 1996, ISBN 9780333658543
- Fascism, Buckingham: Open University Press, 1997, ISBN 9780335194889
- The Fabrication of Social Order: A Critical Theory of Police Power, London: Pluto Press, 2000, ISBN 9780745314891
- Imagining the State, Maidenhead: Open University Press, 2003, ISBN 0-335-20351-5
- The Monstrous and the Dead: Burke, Marx, Fascism, Cardiff: University of Wales Press, 2005, ISBN 0-7083-1903-3
- Critique of Security, Edinburgh: Edinburgh University Press, 2008, ISBN 9780748633289
- Anti-Security (ed., with George S. Rigakos), Ottawa: Red Quill Books, 2011, ISBN 978-1-9269581-4-9
- Güvenlik, Şiddet ve Savaş, Ankara: Dipnot Press, 2012, ISBN 978-605-4412-40-2
- War Power, Police Power, Edinburgh: Edinburgh University Press, 2014, ISBN 978-0-7486-9237-8
- The Universal Adversary: Security, Capital and 'The Enemies of All Mankind' , Abingdon: Routledge, 2016, ISBN 978-1-13-895515-8
- Critique de la sécurité : Accumulation capitaliste et pacification sociale, Paris: Editions Eterotopia, 2017, ISBN 979-1093250205
- A Critical Theory of Police Power, London: Verso Books, 2021, ISBN 978-1788735209
- The Politics of Immunity: Security and the Policing of Bodies, London: Verso Books, 2022, ISBN 9781839764837
- The Security Abolition Manifesto (with The Anti-Security Collective), Ottawa: Red Quill Books, 2024, ISBN 978-1926958385
- Πρόληψη, ασφάλεια, αστυνομία: θεωρία ενάντια στο επερχόμενο κράτος (with C. Boukalas), Athens: Affect Editions, 2024, ISBN 978-618-86986-2-8
- Pacification: Social War and the Power of Police, London: Verso, 2025, ISBN 9781804294017
