= Caygill =

Caygill is a surname. Notable people with the surname include:

- Alex Caygill (born 1940), English golfer
- David Caygill (born 1948), New Zealand politician
- Howard Caygill (born 1958), British philosopher
- Josh Caygill (born 1989), British racing driver
- Howard Caygill (born 1958) European Philosopher

== See also ==
- Cargill (surname)
