= Peter Dews (philosopher) =

British philosopher (born 1952)

- Born: 22 April 1952 (age 74)

Academic background
- Education: Queens' College, Cambridge; University of Essex
- Alma mater: University of Southampton (PhD)
- Thesis: Meaning, Force and Truth in Post-Structuralism: A Critical Presentation of Recent French Philosophies (1984)
- Doctoral advisor: Anthony Manser
- Other advisors: Perry Anderson, Peter Osborne, Jonathan Rée

Academic work
- Era: Contemporary philosophy
- Region: Western philosophy
- School or tradition: German Idealism
- Institutions: Middlesex University; Anglia Ruskin University; University of Essex
- Website: https://web.archive.org/web/20250909155606/https://www.essex.ac.uk/people/DEWSP24209/Peter-Dews

Peter Kenneth Dews (born 22 April 1952) is a British philosopher specialising in critical theory and continental philosophy, and an emeritus professor at the University of Essex.

== Life and works ==
His first degree was in English from Queens' College, Cambridge, followed by a master's in sociology of literature from the University of Essex. He has a doctorate in philosophy from the University of Southampton.

He taught philosophy at Middlesex University, and European philosophy and literature at Anglia Ruskin University, before joining the academic staff of the University of Essex. He was a Humboldt Fellow at the University of Tübingen.

Dews made his name with the Logics of Disintegration, on the limitations of post-structuralism. Dews's 2023 book on Schelling's Late Philosophy was the subject of a book symposium by Review for the Society of German Idealism and Romanticism, in which it received reviews from James Kreines, Philipp Schwab and Marcela García Romero.

He was dubbed "the UK's most sensitive Habermas-watcher" by journalist Pat Kane in 1993.

=== Publications ===
==== Books ====
- Logics of Disintegration: Post-structuralist Thought and the Claims of Critical Theory. London: Verso. 1987. ISBN 978-0-86091-813-4.
- The Limits of Disenchantment: Essays on Contemporary European Philosophy. London: Verso. 1995. ISBN 978-1-85984-022-1.
- The Idea of Evil. Oxford: Blackwell. 2008. doi:10.1002/9780470691830. ISBN 978-1-4051-1704-3.
- Schelling's Late Philosophy in Confrontation with Hegel. New York: Oxford University Press. 2022. doi:10.1093/oso/9780190069124.001.0001. ISBN 978-0-19-006912-4.

===== Edited volumes =====
- Habermas, Jürgen (1986). — (ed.). Autonomy and Solidarity: Interviews. London: Verso. ISBN 0860911322. (2nd edn. 1992, ISBN 0860913678)
- —; Critchley, Simon, eds. (1996). Deconstructive Subjectivities. State University of New York Press. ISBN 978-0-7914-2724-8.
- —, ed. (1999). Habermas: A Critical Reader. Oxford: Blackwell. ISBN 0631201343.

==== Selected articles and book chapters ====
- "The 'New Philosophers' and the End of Leftism". Radical Philosophy. 24: 2–11. 1980. ISSN 0300-211X.
- "Hegel in Analysis: Slavoj Zizek's Lacanian Dialectics". Bulletin of the Hegel Society of Great Britain. 11 (1–2): 1–18. 1990. doi:10.1017/S0263523200004687.
- "Foucault and the French Tradition of Historical Epistemology". History of European Ideas. 14 (3): 347–363. 1992. doi:10.1016/0191-6599(92)90213-V.
- Ball, Terence; Bellamy, Richard, eds. (2006). "Postmodernism: Pathologies of Modernity from Nietzsche to the Post-structuralists". The Cambridge History of Twentieth-Century Political Thought. Cambridge: Cambridge University Press. pp. 343–367. doi:10.1017/CHOL9780521563543.018. ISBN 9780521691628.
- Stolzenberg, Jürgen; Rudolph, Oliver-Pierre, eds. (2010). "Nature and Subjectivity: Fichte's Role in the Pippin/McDowell Debate in the Light of his Neo-Kantian Reception". Wissen, Freiheit, Geschichte. Die Philosophie Fichtes im 19. und 20. Jahrhundert. Amsterdam: Rodopi. pp. 235–250. doi:10.1163/9789042027596_012. ISBN 978-90-420-2758-9.
- Gane, Mike, ed. (2010). "The Nouvelle Philosophie and Foucault". Towards a Critique of Foucault: Foucault, Lacan and the Question of Ethics. London: Taylor & Francis. pp. 61–105. ISBN 9780415562089.
- "Nietzsche for Losers?". New Left Review. 86 (2): 209–230. 2014. doi:10.64590/isy.
- "Dialectics and the Transcendence of Dialectics: Adorno's Relation to Schelling". British Journal for the History of Philosophy. 22 (6): 1180–1207. 2014. doi:10.1080/09608788.2014.992857.
- Fink, Hans; Stern, Robert, eds. (2017). "The Configuration of the Ethical Demand in Løgstrup and Levinas". What is Ethically Demanded? K. E. Løgstrup's Philosophy of Moral Life. Notre Dame, IN: Notre Dame University Press. pp. 102–129. doi:10.2307/j.ctvpj755r.9. ISBN 978-0-268-10185-5.
- Gordon, Peter E.; Hammer, Espen; Honneth, Axel, eds. (2018). "Schelling and the Frankfurt School". The Routledge Companion to the Frankfurt School. London: Routledge. pp. 394–409. ISBN 9781138333246.
