= Ann Birch =

Canadian writer

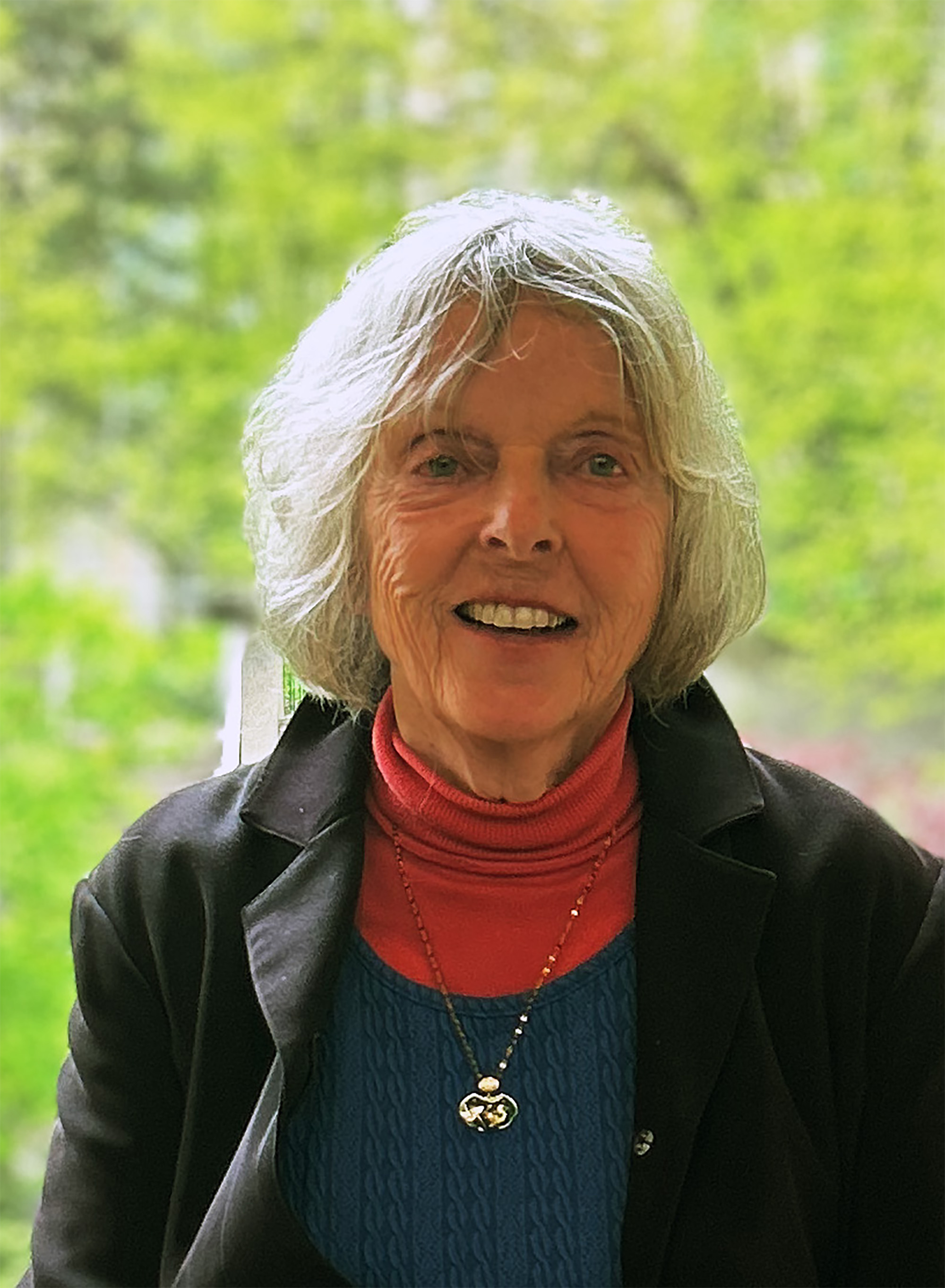
Birch in 2024

Ann Birch is a Canadian author, educator, and editor. She is known for her historical fiction set in early Upper Canada and Toronto. Her work often explores the intersection of social scandals and historical figures in 19th-century Ontario.

== Career ==
=== Education ===
Birch holds a Master of Arts in Canadian literature (1974) from the University of Toronto. She spent several decades in the Toronto education system, serving as the Head of English for multiple secondary schools. In 1996, she was named Teacher of the Year. She has given lectures on writing pedagogy at national and international conferences. Following her career in secondary education, she served as an associate professor in the teacher-training programs at York University and the University of Toronto.

=== Writing and editing ===
In addition to teaching, Birch has written articles, reviews, and essays for major newspapers and magazines. She also works as a freelance editor and teaches writing workshops in memoir, fiction, and poetry.

Birch's literary career began with the publication of her textbook, Essay Writing Made Easy. It became a widely used resource in Canadian classrooms. A popular high-school and college text, the book was recognized for excellence in educational writing by Canada's western provinces.

Birch transitioned to historical fiction with her 2010 novel Settlement. It explores scandals involving Sam Jarvis and Anna Jameson—an untold story of scandal and political intrigue in early Toronto. It was selected for the "Big Read" promotion by the city of Orillia in 2014. Birch's historical fiction has received endorsements from Canadian authors including Barbara Kyle, Robert Rotenberg, Richard Scrimger, and Gail Anderson-Dargatz. A review in Historical Novels Review noted that Birch “brings 19th-century Canada to life,” praising her vivid portrayal of early Toronto society and characters. "While the author puts words in each of [the characters] mouths, and passion in their hearts, she also vividly and accurately recreates the world around them."

Her subsequent novels have continued to focus on Toronto's history, including The Secret Life of Roberta Greaves, which drew on her experiences in academia, and Duelling in a New World, a fictionalized account of John White, Upper Canada's first Attorney-General. A review mentioned the book as having "delicious wit and irony."

Birch's third novel, Duelling in a New World, received positive attention for its detailed reconstruction of 19th-century Toronto and its focus on the moral complexities of John White. Critics have described the work as "rich with details" regarding the political intrigues of early Upper Canada.

Her 2020 novel, A Daughter Rebels, follows the life of historical figure Anne Powell. Critics have praised A Daughter Rebels, as "exceptionally fine" prose and sophisticated writing, noting its ability to bring the daily life and social constraints of early 19th-century Toronto vividly to life.

== Publications ==
- Birch, Ann (1993). Essay Writing Made Easy. Pembroke Publishers. ISBN 978-1-5513-8016-2.
- — (2010). Settlement. Dundurn Press. ISBN 978-1-9266-0720-7.
- — (2014). The Secret Life of Roberta Greaves. Inanna Publications. ISBN 978-1-7713-3325-2.
- — (2018). Duelling in a New World. BWL Publishing Inc. ISBN 978-0-2286-0046-6.
- — (2020). A Daughter Rebels. BWL Publishing Inc. ISBN 978-0-2286-1228-5.

== Historical and volunteer work ==
Birch's interest in Toronto's early history informs her fiction. She is affiliated with heritage organizations and has participated in community events related to local history.

== Personal life ==
Birch is an avid traveller, hiker, and lover of opera, symphony, and ballet. She lives in Toronto, Ontario.
