= Gillian Rose =

British philosopher (1947–1995)

- Born: Gillian Rosemary Stone; 20 September 1947; London, England
- Died: 9 December 1995 (aged 48); Coventry, Warwickshire, England

Education
- Education: St Hilda's College, Oxford; Columbia University; Free University Berlin; St Antony's College, Oxford
- Thesis: Reification as a Sociological Category: Theodor W. Adorno's Concept of Reification and the Possibility of a Critical Theory of Society (1976)
- Doctoral advisor: Leszek Kołakowski, Steven Lukes

Philosophical work
- Era: 20th-century philosophy
- Region: Western philosophy
- School: Neo-Hegelianism; Critical theory Marxism
- Institutions: University of Sussex; University of Warwick
- Doctoral students: Howard Caygill, Peter Osborne, Kimberly Hutchings
- Main interests: Philosophy of law, ethics, social philosophy
- Notable ideas: The broken middle, speculative identity

Gillian Rosemary Rose (née Stone; 20 September 1947 – 9 December 1995) was a British philosopher and writer. Rose held the chair of social and political thought at the University of Warwick until 1995. Rose began her teaching career at the University of Sussex. She worked in the fields of philosophy and sociology. Her writings include The Melancholy Science, Hegel Contra Sociology, Dialectic of Nihilism, Mourning Becomes the Law, and Paradiso, among others.

Notable facets of her work include criticism of neo-Kantianism, post-modernism, and political theology in tandem with what has been described as "a forceful defence of Hegel's speculative thought," largely with the ambition of philosophically substantiating and extending the critical theory of Karl Marx.

== Early life and education ==
Gillian Rose was born in London into a secular Jewish family. She was the elder sister of the British academic Jacqueline Rose. Shortly after her parents divorced, when Rose was still quite young, her mother married another man, her stepfather, with whom Rose became close as she drifted from her biological father. These aspects of her family life figured in her late memoir Love's Work (1995). Also in her memoir, she writes that her "passion for philosophy" was bred at age 17 when she read Pascal's Pensées and Plato's Republic.

Rose attended Ealing Grammar School and went on to St Hilda's College, Oxford, where she read PPE. Taught philosophy by Jean Austin, widow of the philosopher J. L. Austin, she later described herself as bristling under the constraints of Oxford-style philosophy. She never forgot Austin remarking in class, "Remember, girls, all the philosophers you will read are much more intelligent than you are." In a late interview, Rose commented of philosophers trained at Oxford, "It teaches them to be clever, destructive, supercilious and ignorant. It doesn't teach you what's important. It doesn't feed the soul." Sociologist Jean Floud helped keep Rose's passion for philosophy alive in her final year at Oxford. Rose graduated with upper second-class honours. Before beginning her Doctor of Philosophy at St. Antony's College, Oxford, she studied at Columbia University as a Ford Foundation Fellow and at the Free University, Berlin. While in Germany, she was introduced to Hegel by Dieter Henrich.

== Work ==
Rose's career began with a dissertation on Theodor W. Adorno, supervised by Steven Lukes and the Polish philosopher Leszek Kołakowski, who wryly spoke to her of Adorno as a third-rate thinker. This dissertation eventually became the basis for her first book, The Melancholy Science: An Introduction to the Thought of Theodor W. Adorno (1978). She became well known partly through her critiques of postmodernism and post-structuralism. In Dialectic of Nihilism (1984), for instance, she leveled criticisms at Gilles Deleuze, Michel Foucault, and Jacques Derrida. Later, in her essay "Of Derrida's Spirit" in Judaism and Modernity (1993), Rose critiqued Derrida's Of Spirit (1987), arguing that his analysis of Heidegger's relation to Nazism relied in key instances on serious misreadings of Hegel, which allowed both Heidegger and Derrida to evade the importance of political history and modern law. In an extended "Note" to the essay, Rose raised similar objections to Derrida's subsequent readings of Hermann Cohen and Walter Benjamin, singling out his notion of the "mystical foundation of authority" as centrally problematic.

In the early 1990s there was a really interesting intellectual context [in England]. There were people like Gillian Rose, David Wood, Jay Bernstein and Geoff Bennington—there was a very high level of intellectual activity. And really good younger people, like Howard Caygill, Peter Osborne, Keith Ansell Pearson, Nick Land and many others. People were really pushing the envelope, thinking hard about deep issues and the standard was extremely high.

--Simon Critchley, 2010

Her first academic appointment was as a lecturer in sociology in 1974 at the School of European Studies (the University of Sussex). In 1989, Rose left Sussex for the University of Warwick when a colleague was unexpectedly promoted over her. Inquiring about the promotion with economist Donald Winch, the then pro-vice-chancellor, he told her that her future at the institution was not bright: "He said to me that I was working in a contextual manner and that the future belonged to those whose work was acceptable to the Government, to industry and to the public." Her chair at Warwick in Social and Political Thought was created for her and she was encouraged to bring her funded PhD students with her. She held her position at Warwick until her death in 1995.

As part of her thinking into the Holocaust, Rose was engaged by the Polish Commission for the Future of Auschwitz in 1990, a delegation which included theologian Richard L. Rubenstein and literary critic David G. Roskies, among others. She wrote about her experience of this commission in her memoir Love's Work and in Mourning Becomes the Law and Paradiso. One of her colleagues on the commission, Marc H. Ellis, has written about Rose's experience as well:

At a crucial moment in our deliberations on the historical knowledge of the Polish guides, Rose spoke, out of turn and off the subject, of the nearness of God. This was a violation of etiquette, and worse. Rose was suggesting that the anger of these delegates, for the most part Holocaust scholars and rabbis, was a retrospective one that, paradoxically sought the Holocaust past as a safe haven from inquiries of the present conduct of the Jewish people.

=== Love's Work (1995) ===
Rose's memoir, Love's Work, detailing her background, maturation as a philosopher, and years-long battle with ovarian cancer, was a bestseller when it was published in 1995. "She has, hitherto, been a respected, weighty, but lone voice among a specialised readership," wrote Elaine Williams at the time, "[but] she has, since her illness, been driven to write philosophy which has created ripples of excitement among a wider critical audience." Marina Warner, writing for the London Review of Books, said "[Love's Work] provokes, inspires and illuminates more profoundly than many a bulky volume, and confronts the great subjects...and it delivers what its title promises, a new allegory about love." In a review in The New York Times, upon the publication of the U.S. edition of the book, Daniel Mendelsohn wrote, "'Love's Work' is a raw but always artfully wrought confrontation with the 'deeper levels of the terrors of the soul'" Love's Work was re-published by NYRB Books in 2011, in the NYRB Classics series, with an introduction by friend and literary critic Michael Wood and including a poem by Geoffrey Hill, which he had dedicated to her. In a review of the re-publication, in The Guardian, Nicholas Lezard commented, "I struggle to think of a finer, more rewarding short autobiography than this." In 2024, Penguin re-published Love's Work in the Penguin Modern Classics series.

== Philosophy ==
=== The Melancholy Science (1978) ===
Rose's first book, The Melancholy Science, is a text that shows Adorno's most significant contribution to the sociology of culture is a Marxist aesthetic. Rose traces Adorno's Marxist critique of philosophy through the works of various philosophers such as Hegel, Kierkegaard, Husserl and Heidegger and essays on Kafka, Mann, Beckett, Brecht and Schönberg. She posits that Adorno offers a ‘sociology of illusion’ that rivals structural Marxism as well as phenomenological sociology and that of the Frankfurt School. In 2014, The Melancholy Science was republished by Verso Books.

=== Hegel Contra Sociology (1981) ===
Her second book, Hegel Contra Sociology, argues that all the major sociological traditions derive from neo-Kantian philosophy and fail to grasp the radical significance of Hegel's critique of Kant. The book sets out Rose's understanding of Hegel, in particular her view that Hegel's is a 'speculative' rather than a 'dialectical' philosophy. Speculative philosophy is concerned with non-identity as much as identity and in this way Hegel was able to pre-empt and disarm many of the charges (not least Popper's charge of justifying totalitarianism) leveled at him. The book has twice been republished: first, in 1995, with a new preface, by Athlone Press, the original publisher; and then in 2009, by Verso Books.

=== Dialectic of Nihilism (1984) ===
Rose's third book, Dialectic of Nihilism, is a reading of post-structuralism through the lens of law. Specifically, she attempts to read a number of thinkers preceding and constituting post-structuralist philosophy against Kant's "defense of the 'usurpatory concept' of freedom", that is, his answer to the question of "How [Reason] is to justify its possession" of freedom "through pure reason, systematically arranged." Rose's primary foci are Martin Heidegger, to whom she devotes three chapters, and Gilles Deleuze, Michel Foucault, and Jacques Derrida, to whom she devotes one chapter apiece. In addition, however, she scrutinises a few of the neo-Kantians (Emil Lask, Rudolf Stammler, and Hermann Cohen), Henri Bergson, and Ferdinand de Saussure and Claude Lévi-Strauss. Her central argument is that with the post-structuralists a "newly insinuated law [is] dissembled as a nihilistic break with knowledge and law, with tradition in general." Describing this situation in the case of Foucault, Rose writes, "like all nihilist programmes, this one insinuates a new law disguised as beyond politics." Concomitantly, Rose contends that similar fates befall the neo-Kantians and other thinkers who try to transcend or ignore the problems of law. According to Rose, the neo-Kantians seek to resolve the Kantian antinomy of law "by drawing an 'original' category out of the Critique of Pure Reason, be it 'mathesis', 'time', or 'power'", yet remain unable to do so because "[t]his mode of resolution ... depends on changing the old sticking point of the unknown categorical imperative into a new vanishing point, where it remains equally categorical and imperative, unknowable but forceful"; while other thinkers—including Lévi-Strauss and Henri Bergson—"fall into the familiar transcendental problem" wherein the "ambiguity in the relation between the conditioned and the precondition is exploited."

The philosopher Howard Caygill—also Rose's literary executor—has taken issue with her readings of Deleuze and Derrida in Dialectic of Nihilism, going so far as to call some of them "frankly tendentious". In a more critical review of the book, Roy Boyne, too, argues that Rose failed to do justice to these figures. "She operates on the highest plane of abstraction", Boyne writes, "for it is only at that level that the polemic makes any sense. Were she to drop down a level or so, she would see that the position she is so concerned to defend is not under attack from the quarters to which she addresses herself." However, Caygill insists that "Whatever the shortcomings of the readings in Dialectic of Nihilism and the unfortunate and unnecessary borders it raised between Rose's thought and that of many of her contemporaries, it did mark a further stage in her retrieval of speculative thought." Scott Lash has asserted that the "real weakness of Dialectic of Nihilism is its propensity toward academic point-scoring", the result of which, according to Lash, is Rose's "devoting some half of its length attempting to discredit the analysts under consideration with their own assumptions, rather than straightforwardly confronting them with her own juridical prescriptions." Yet Lash considers her chapters on Derrida and Foucault to be partial remedies to this issue.

=== The Broken Middle (1992) ===
Begun in early 1986, The Broken Middle: Out of Our Ancient Society was Rose's fourth book and it is considered by some her magnum opus. In his review, John Milbank wrote, "this book is one of the most important written by a British philosopher and social theorist in recent times."

=== Judaism and Modernity (1993) ===
Judaism and Modernity: Philosophical Essays, her fifth book, is a collection of essays in which Rose tries to work out the relationship between philosophy and Judaism. Her aim is to explain how and why philosophers turned to Jews and Judaism to evade the dilemmas of modern philosophy, and how and why religious thinkers turned to the same source to evade the dilemmas of a modern faith confronted by the demands of philosophy. In 2017, like The Melancholy Science, Hegel contra Sociology, and Judaism and Modernity was brought back into print by Verso Books.

=== Mourning Becomes the Law (1996) ===
Rose's last expressly philosophical work, Mourning Becomes the Law: Philosophy and Representation was a posthumous collection of essays. In the book's thematically connected essays, Rose deals with a range of topics, from modern philosophy's melancholic attachments to the failures of the politics of authority and representation. Mourning Becomes the Law is the most personal of Rose's primarily philosophical texts, interweaving autobiographical reflections with rigorous analysis.

== Influence ==
Already in 1995, Rowan Williams commented, "Gillian Rose's work has had far less discussion than it merits." In the decades following Williams' statement others have reiterated the sentiment. Indeed, scholar of religion Vincent Lloyd comments:

Everywhere I went I kept encountering professors who loved Rose's work, who thought she was brilliant and right, but who had for one reason or another never mentioned her name in print. There were Jeffrey Stout and Cornel West at Princeton, both of whom taught Rose's books, Paul Mendes-Flohr at Chicago who knew her well, and Judith Butler and Daniel Boyarin at Berkeley.

Nevertheless, Rose's work has made more explicit inroads among a number of important thinkers, not the least of them Williams, whose revaluation of Hegel in the 1990s has been attributed to Rose's influence. On the philosophy of Hegel, in a text of 1991, Slavoj Žižek writes, "one has to grasp the fundamental paradox of the speculative identity as it was recently identified by Gillian Rose." Žižek here refers to Rose's second book Hegel contra Sociology (1981); subsequently, his Hegelianism was dubbed "speculative" by Marcus Pound. In turn, Howard Caygill observes of Hegel contra Sociology: "This work revolutionized the study of Hegel, providing a comprehensive account of his speculative philosophy that overcame the distinction between religious ('right Hegelian') and political ('left Hegelian') interpretations that had prevailed since the death of the philosopher in 1832." And the work is still cited in Hegel scholarship.

Two of Rose's students, Paul Gilroy and David Marriott, have emerged as key thinkers of critical race theory and have acknowledged her influence. When John Milbank published Theology and Social Theory in 1990, he cited Rose as one of the thinkers without whom "the present book would not have been conceivable." Marcus Pound recently found that "Rose was the Blackwell reader for Milbank's Theology and Social Theory. The Rose archives at Warwick include the letters Milbank and Rose exchanged on the subject. In particular she pushed him to clarify the nature of the subject which underpinned Theology and Social Theory. In response Milbank wrote 'The Sublime in Kierkegaard'."

Although Rose's influence is strongest in Europe, she maintained important US ties from her Columbia days onward. American philosopher Jay Bernstein was a close friend and colleague; the two read all of each other's works in draft. Bernstein eulogized Rose in The Guardian. Near the end of her life, Rose was in a sustained dialogue with American philosopher Stanley Cavell about Hegel and Kierkegaard.

== Legacy ==
Two special issues on Gillian Rose have appeared from scholarly journals. The first, "The Work of Gillian Rose," appeared in 1998 in volume 9, issue 1 of the journal Women: A Cultural Review. It contained contributions from students and friends, including Laura Marcus, Howard Caygill, and Nigel Tubbs, as well as an edited transcription of "two W. H. Smith exercise books containing the notes and observations that [Rose] had been writing...until shortly before her death" in hospital. An essay by literary critic Isobel Armstrong, which appeared alongside but not as a part of the special issue, turns on Rose's concept of "the broken middle" and presents a careful and appreciative reading of her work. In 2015 the journal Telos released a special issue on Rose, gathering responses and critiques to her work from Rowan Williams, John Milbank, Peter Osborne, and Nigel Tubbs.

In 2019, The Centre for Research in Modern European Philosophy at Kingston University, London established an annual Gillian Rose Memorial Lecture. The inaugural speaker was professor of philosophy and comparative literature Rebecca Comay. Rose's papers are held by Warwick University Library in the Modern Records Centre.

== Death ==
Rose was diagnosed with ovarian cancer in 1993. She died in Coventry at the age of 48. She made a deathbed conversion to Christianity through the Anglican Church. Andrew Shanks notes that "there is evidence, among the papers left behind from her final illness, that at one point [Rose] seriously considered the alternative of Roman Catholicism."

She left to the library of Warwick University parts of her own personal library, including a collection of essential works on the History of Christianity and Theology, which are marked "From the Library of Professor Gillian Rose, 1995" on the inside cover. Rose is survived by her parents, her sister, the academic and writer Jacqueline Rose, her half sisters, Alison Rose and Diana Stone, and her half brother, Anthony Stone.

== Works ==
=== Dissertation ===
- "Reification as a Sociological Category: Theodor W. Adorno's Concept of Reification and the Possibility of a Critical Theory of Society," University of Oxford (1976)

=== Books ===
- The Melancholy Science: An Introduction to the Thought of Theodor W. Adorno (1978)
- Hegel contra Sociology (1981)
- Dialectic of Nihilism: Post-Structuralism and Law (1984)
- The Broken Middle: Out of Our Ancient Society (1992)
- Judaism and Modernity: Philosophical Essays (1993)
- Love's Work: A Reckoning With Life (1995)
- Mourning Becomes the Law: Philosophy and Representation (1996)
- Paradiso (1999)
- Marxist Modernism: Introductory Lectures on Frankfurt School Critical Theory (Verso, 2024)

=== Essays, articles and reviews ===
- "How Is Critical Theory Possible? Theodor W. Adorno and Concept Formation in Sociology," Political Studies 24.1 (March 1976), 69–85.
- Review of Theodor W. Adorno, Negative Dialectics, in The American Political Science Review 7.2 (June 1976), 598–9.
- Review of Susan Buck-Morss, The Origin of Negative Dialectics and Zolton Tar, The Frankfurt School, in History and Theory 18.1 (February 1979), 126–135.
- Review of Thomas McCarthy, The Critical Theory of Jürgen Habermas, in British Journal of Sociology 31.1 (March 1980), 110–1.
- "A ghost in his own machine", review of Points...: Interviews, 1974–1994 and Spectres of Marx by Jacques Derrida. The Times 27 July 1995.
- "The Final Notebooks of Gillian Rose", Women: A Cultural Review 9:1 (1998), 6–18, edited by Howard Caygill.
- "Beginnings of the Day: Fascism and Representation", paper in Modernism, Culture and 'the Jew' (1998) [the book is dedicated to Rose]

=== Unpublished writings ===
- "Italian Journey" (uploaded to www.gillianrose.org)
- "Your Visit to Auschwitz" (uploaded to www.gillianrose.org)
