= Peter Osborne (philosopher) =

British philosopher (born 1958)

- Born: 1958 (age 67–68)
- Known for: Radical Philosophy

Academic background
- Education: University of Bristol (BA, 1979); University of Sussex (MA, 1980), University of Sussex (PhD, 1988)
- Thesis: The Carnival of Philosophy: Philosophy, Politics and Science in Hegel and Marx (1988)
- Doctoral advisor: Christopher Arthur
- Other advisor: Gillian Rose

Academic work
- Discipline: Philosophy
- Institutions: Kingston University; Middlesex University

Peter Gordon Osborne (born 1958) is a British philosophy teacher who is Professor of Modern European Philosophy and Director of the Centre for Research in Modern European Philosophy (CRMEP) – Kingston University. He is a former editor of the journal Radical Philosophy.

== Education ==
Osborne graduated from the University of Bristol in 1979, with a Bachelor of Science in philosophy and economics, went on to obtain a Master of Arts in Philosophy at the University of Sussex in 1980, and stayed on to earn a Doctor of Philosophy degree in 1988. Osborne, along with CRMEP colleague Howard Caygill, was initially supervised by Gillian Rose, but he eventually completed his PhD under Christopher Arthur.

== Career ==
Osborne returned to the University of Bristol in 1988 to become a lecturer in the philosophy department. Then, in 1989, he lectured in the undergraduate philosophy department at Middlesex University, remaining there until he became, first, a senior lecturer (in 1992), then a reader in the graduate programme, before becoming a professor in 1997.

Osborne has subsequently served as a supervisor for PhD candidates, including Mark Neocleous (now Professor of the Critique of Political Economy Politics and History, Brunel University London), Bob Cannon (now Senior Lecturer in Sociology and the BA Sociology Programme Leader, University of East London), Stewart Martin (now Reader in Philosophy and Fine Art, Middlesex University), Andrew McGettigan (now a freelance writer/researcher on philosophy, the arts, and education), Alastair Morgan (now Lecturer in Mental Health and Social Care, University of Nottingham), Katie Lloyd Thomas (now Lecturer in Architecture, Newcastle University).

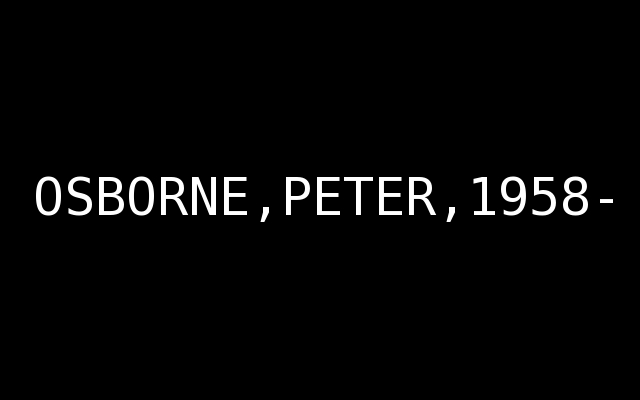
Date of birth Digital Painting (After Kawara), 2011

Osborne's books include: The Postconceptual Condition: Critical Essays (2018); Anywhere or Not at All: Philosophy of Contemporary Art (2013); The Politics of Time: Modernity and Avant-Garde (1995/2010); Marx (2005); Conceptual Art (2002); and Philosophy in Cultural Theory (2000). He also edited the three-volume Walter Benjamin: Critical Evaluations in Cultural Theory (2005). Osborne's writing on contemporary art includes contributions to the journals Afterall, Art History, October, and Oxford Art Journal Catalogues accompanying exhibitions including: Matias Faldbakken: The Shock of Abstraction, the National Museum of Art, Architecture and Design, Oslo and Ikon, Birmingham, 2009; The Quick and the Dead, the Walker Art Center, Minneapolis, Minnesota, 2009; and Sol LeWitt's Sentences on Conceptual Art, The Office of Contemporary Art Oslo, Norway, 2009.

Osborne teaches and publishes on Modern European Philosophy and the philosophy of modern and contemporary art — with particular reference to Conceptual Art. He has written catalogue essays for the Tate Modern art gallery in London, the Biennale art festival of Sydney, Australia, the Walker Art Center, and the Norwegian National Museum of Art, Architecture and Design. He has acted as a consultant to the Education Programme at the Tate Britain art gallery in London and In Defence of Philosophy] on the Tate Channel) and is consultant for the Office of Contemporary Art (OCA) in Norway with regard to the representation of Norway at the 2011 Venice Biennale.

Osborne also served as editorial consultant for a series of publication for OCA, and currently serves as a member of the advisory board for Pavilion (Journal for Politics and Culture). He has played a major role in the bimonthly British journal Radical Philosophy for nearly thirty years and plays an active role in current debates about the future of universities in the United Kingdom. He is the Director of the Centre for Research in Modern European Philosophy at Kingston University.

=== Transition from Middlesex to Kingston ===
In April 2010, Middlesex University decided to close down Philosophy, its highest research-rated subject. Middlesex students and staff, and thousands of their supporters in the UK and around the world, campaigned to save it. The website set up as part of the effort to do so is still running today and is continually updated vis-à-vis related campaigns and issues.

=== Background and project ===
Broadly speaking, Osborne's project has followed the conception and function of philosophy as 'its own time comprehended in thought' (Hegel). (At a talk at the ICA that was held in response to the (then) plans to close the philosophy department when Osborne and the CRMEP was based at Middlesex, he spoke of the fact that as a practise, philosophy is not quantifiable; that is, it is not something that is easily measurable by time.)

Osborne completed his doctoral thesis at the University of Sussex in England in 1988. Entitled The carnival of philosophy: philosophy, politics and science in Hegel and Marx, it no doubt formed some of the material for the more recently published How to Read Marx (Granta magazine, 2005), the fifth chapter of which recalls its title. A central influence on Osborne's thought has been the work of German philosopher Theodor W. Adorno, who figures in his early essays concerning the problem of modernity and the crisis in the visual arts

Osborne's first book, The Politics of Time: Modernity and Avant-Garde (Verso Books, 1995, reprinted 2011) was reflective of his general understanding of the modern European tradition of philosophy as being "first and foremost a philosophy of time", stemming from the work of Immanuel Kant, as founder of modern philosophy. Osborne discussed the politics of time in relation to contemporary art in a discussion organised by the Frieze Art Foundation and held in conjunction with the London Frieze Art Fair in 2008.

In a recent exchange with his colleague Eric Alliez at the Stanley Picker Gallery on 27 April 2007, Osborne explained that at "the end of the Eighties, my project became to "mediate Aesthetic Theory with the history of contemporary art since the 1960s" (understanding Adorno's project as "the project of mediating the transdisciplinary post-Kantianism of Benjamin's thought with the history of modernism") specifically, through the reinvention of 'the dialectic of construction and expression' (Philosophy and Contemporary Art After Adorno and Deleuze: An Exchange)). The late work of Adorno anticipates the breakdown of the difference between the arts that Osborne is interested in coming to terms with (see Art Theory and Aesthetics, below).

The follow-up to "The Politics of Time", Philosophy in Cultural Theory, was concerned with what is currently (2011) being pursued further by the CRMEP; namely, the transdisciplinary status of philosophy, as opposed to its traditional self-understanding as a self-contained discipline.

=== Art theory and aesthetics ===
Conceptual Art (Phaidon Press, 2002), constituted an authoritative survey of the art of the late Sixties and early Seventies (and beyond). Conceptual art challenged the aesthetic definition of the work of art, and attempted but failed to be absolutely anti-aesthetic. Nonetheless, it made the conceptual aspects of all art explicit to subsequent generations of artists.

For Osborne, a crucial juncture in the transformation of the ontology of the work of art (what art most fundamentally is) is marked by the work of American artist Robert Smithson. According to this view, the traditional practise of art according to mediums (painting, sculpture, architecture) is understood to have been historically destroyed ontologically by a transcategorial practise and field — inaugurated by work like Smithson's. This is intimated in the title for a lecture he gave on Smithson at the Centre for Contemporary Art in 2008: 'An interminable avalanche of categories': conceptual issues in the work of Robert Smithson (or, once more, against 'sculpture'), as part of a series of lectures given by significant art historians under the title Cornerstones.

Osborne later made the speculative claim elsewhere that "contemporary art is post-conceptual art" in a public lecture delivered at the Fondazione Antonio Ratti (FAR), Villa Sucota, in Como, Italy, 9 July 2010. It is a claim made at the level of the ontology of the work of art (rather than say at the descriptive level of style or movement). Around the same time, he gave a lecture in conjunction with Pavilion on the concept of the contemporary and the work of The Atlas Group entitled The Fiction of the Contemporary: Speculative Collectivity and the Global Transnational. He subsequently published an essay in issue 15 of the Pavilion Journal for Politics and Culture, entitled: Imaginary Radicalisms: Notes on the Libertarianism of Contemporary Art.

In 2013, Osborne published Anywhere or Not at All: Philosophy of Contemporary Art, which develops the speculative claim "contemporary art is post-conceptual art".

== Works ==
- Osborne, Peter: Marx and the philosophy of time. Radical philosophy(147), pp. 15–22. ISSN (print) 0300-211X
- Osborne, Peter: (9 July 2010) Contemporary art is post-conceptual art, Public Lecture, Fondazione Antonio Ratti, Villa Sucota, Como
- Osborne, Peter and Alliez, Eric: (2008) "Philosophy and contemporary art after Adorno and Deleuze: an Exchange" in Garnett, Robert and Hunt, Andrew, (eds.) Gest: laboratory of synthesis #1, London, Book Works, pp. 35–64.
- Osborne, Peter: (2022), Crisis as Form, Verso Books, London.
- Osborne, Peter: (2013), Anywhere Or Not at All: Philosophy of Contemporary Art, Verso Books, London
- Osborne, Peter: (2010), El arte más allá de la estética. Ensayos filosóficos sobre arte contemporáneo, trans. Yaiza Hernández Velázquez, Murcia, Cendeac.
- Osborne, Peter: (2005) How to read Marx, London, U.K. : Granta, (How to read) ISBN 1-86207-771-1
- Osborne, Peter: (2002) Conceptual Art, London, Phaidon Press Ltd, 304p ISBN 0-7148-3930-2
- Osborne, Peter: (2000) Philosophy in Cultural Theory, London, U.K. : Routledge. 146p. ISBN 0415238013
- Osborne, Peter: (1995) The Politics of Time: Modernity and Avant-garde, London, U.K. : Verso Books. 272p. ISBN 0-86091-652-9
