= Brunswick Books =

- Founded: 1978
- Defunct: March 27, 2023
- Country of origin: Canada
- Headquarters location: Toronto
- Publication types: Books, journals
- Official website: www.brunswickbooks.ca

Brunswick Books (formerly Fernwood Books) is a Canadian academic publishing company, founded in 1978 and headquartered in Toronto. It is primarily a book marketing and sales company for Canadian universities. It describes its aim as "to provide progressive books from progressive publishers to progressive people."

The company markets and sells books on behalf of

- Between the Lines
- Charivari Press
- Demeter Press
- Fernwood Publishing
- Inanna Publications
- JCharlton Publishing
- Merlin Press
- Monthly Review Press
- Pambazuka Press
- Purich Publishing
- Pluto Books
- Roseway Publishing
- Red Quill Books
- Arbeiter Ring Publishing
- Cape Breton University Press
- Waves of the Future
- Zed Books
- Brush Education Inc.
- University of Regina Press
