= Canadian Woman Studies =

- Cover of the first issue, 1978.
- Discipline: Women's studies
- Language: English, French
- Edited by: Luciana Ricciutelli

Publication details
- History: 1978–present
- Publisher: Inanna Publications (Canada)
- Frequency: Quarterly

Standard abbreviations
- ISO 4: Can. Woman Stud.

Indexing
- ISSN: 0713-3235
- LCCN: 88649098
- OCLC no.: 60622532

Links
- Journal homepage; Online archive

Canadian Woman Studies (French: Les cahiers de la femme) is a bilingual feminist quarterly academic journal covering women's studies. It is published by Inanna Publications and was established in 1978 by Marion Lynn and Shelagh Wilkinson. The current editor-in-chief is Luciana Ricciutelli.
