= Socialist Studies (book series) =

Socialist Studies was an academic book series published annually by the Society for Socialist Studies (Canada).

== Series history ==
Volume	Title	Date	Co-publisher	ISBN
1	Socialism and Feminism	1983–1984	—	—
2	Critical Perspectives on the Constitution	1984–1985	—	—
3	Work and New Technologies: Other Perspectives	1986–1987	BTL	ISBN 0-919946-83-6
4	Social Movements / Social Change	1987–1988	BTL	ISBN 0-919946-82-8
5	Race, Class, Gender: Bonds and Barriers	1989–1990	Garamond Press	ISBN 0-920059-92-9
6	Regulating Labour: The State, Neo-Conservatism and Industrial Relations	1990–1991	Garamond Press	ISBN 0-920059-99-6
7	Socialism in Crisis? Canadian Perspectives	1991–1992	Fernwood Publishing	ISBN 1-895686-08-3
8	1492–1992 – Five Centuries of Imperialism and Resistance	1992–1993	Fernwood Publishing	ISBN 1-895686-24-5
9	Green on Red – Evolving Ecological Socialism	1993–1994	Fernwood Publishing	ISBN 1-895686-42-3
10	Labour Gains, Labour Pains: Fifty Years of PC 1003	1994–1995	Fernwood Publishing	ISBN 1-895686-66-0
11	The Training Trap: Ideology, Training and the Labour Market	1995–1996	Fernwood Publishing	ISBN 1-895686-67-9
12	Global Justice, Global Democracy	1996–1997	Fernwood Publishing	ISBN 1-895686-82-2
