= Fernwood Publishing =

Independent Canadian publisher

- Status: Active
- Founded: 1991
- Founder: Errol Sharpe
- Country of origin: Canada
- Headquarters location: Nova Scotia
- Distribution: Brunswick Books
- Key people: Errol Sharpe, Wayne Antony, Beverley Rach
- Publication types: Books
- Nonfiction topics: politics, public policy, social sciences, aboriginal issues
- Imprints: Fernwood (non-fiction), Roseway (fiction)
- No. of employees: 7
- Official website: fernwoodpublishing.ca

Fernwood Publishing is an independent Canadian publishing company based in Nova Scotia. The company publishes non-fiction books primarily concerning social justice, politics, and economics.

Fernwood was founded in 1991 in Halifax, Nova Scotia, publishing its first books in the spring of 1992. The Halifax office was moved to Black Point, Nova Scotia and, in 1994, a second office was opened in Winnipeg, Manitoba. In eighteen seasons, Fernwood has published over 300 titles. In 2006, Fernwood acquired Roseway Publishing, which is now their fiction imprint.

Founder and co-publisher Errol Sharpe has been quoted as saying, "In an era when the restructuring of capitalism seems to be threatening to erase many of the gains that have been made by the oppressed in society, we think that our books have a part to play in bucking the trend." The Society for Socialist Studies has an annual book prize named after Errol Sharpe, the Errol Sharpe Book Prize.

In 2018, Fernwood Publishing released There’s Something in the Water by Ingrid Waldron. In 2020, It inspired a documentary that premiered in Toronto International Film Festival (TIFF) and eventually in Netflix.

== Notable releases ==
- Socialist Studies (series)

== See also ==
- Literature of Nova Scotia
- List of writers from Nova Scotia
