= Manga de Dokuha =

Series of manga versions of classic literature

Manga de Dokuha (Japanese: まんがで読破; "Reading Through with Manga") is a series of manga adaptations of classic literature. Published by East Press and later Gakken, the series aims to introduce average manga readers to important literary works they would otherwise not be aware of or willing to read. The series received press coverage for its publication of often controversial political treatises. East Press published best-selling versions of the communist novel Kanikōsen, Karl Marx's Das Kapital and Adolf Hitler's Mein Kampf. Some of the books were translated and made available in other languages such as English, Portuguese, and Spanish.

Manga de Dokuha was launched by East Press in an effort to expose young Japanese people to classic works of literature in a manga format. Kosuke Maruo produces each book in the series and outlines the narrative while artwork is created by Variety Art Works. The books in the series were often sold through easily accessible convenience stores, including 7-Eleven. Maruo said: "We thought that maybe we could get people to read well-known works perceived as tough reads by turning them into manga and selling them at convenience stores". In July 2008, the series' first 17 entries had sold over 900,000 copies. The average sales for an entry in the series were around 35,000.

== Significant entries ==
=== Kanikōsen and Das Kapital ===
First manga edition of Kanikōsen, published by East Press in October 2007

Kanikōsen (蟹工船) (published in English as The Crab Canning Ship or The Crab Ship) is a 1929 Japanese novel by Takiji Kobayashi. Written from a left-wing political perspective, the book follows the crew of a crab fishing ship living under oppressive conditions while being exploited by capitalists. The novel which typically sells around 5,000 copies a year became an unexpected bestseller in 2008 and sold over 507,000 copies that year. The same year, East Press published its own manga version of the novel which sold over 200,000 copies. In response to the popularity of the communist-themed Kanikōsen manga, East Press published a manga version of Karl Marx's 1867 treatise Das Kapital. This version presents the original Marxist anti-capitalist principles via the fictionalized tale of Robin, the owner of a cheese factory who experiences guilt for exploiting his workers and betraying his father's socialist principles. Maruo stated that "I think people are looking to Marx for answers to the problems with capitalist society. Obviously, the recent global crisis suggests that the system isn't working properly". East Press's edition of Das Kapital sold 6,000 copies in its first few days of publication.

The renewed success of both the novel and manga versions of Kanikōsen as well as that of the manga Das Kapital were often discussed in the context of the rising popularity of left-wing literature in Japan, the late-2000s recession affecting Japan and growing membership of the Japanese Communist Party. According to Waseda University literature professor Hirokazu Toeda, "Kanikōsen is discussed and analyzed every time a critical social issue occurs – the disparity society, severe labor conditions, consumer product falsification, random killings. This is a unique characteristic of the Kanikōsen boom and it now is symbolizing or mirroring all those negative aspects of current day Japan". Daisuke Asao, a senior office of the National Confederation of Trades Unions, said that "the situation of those labourers in the book is very similar to modern temporary workers: the unpredictable contracts, the working under heavy supervision, violence from supervisors, the widespread sexual harassment and the pressure against unionisation are all things that modern Japanese recognise every day". Anti-poverty activist Kosuke Hashimoto responded to the books' popularity, saying: "I think many young people in Japan are afraid of the future, and that fear is sometimes turning to anger. Reading comics might only be the start". Social welfare advocate Kaori Katada said: "Poverty has been a growing and visible problem for some time, but now people are looking for answers about why it is returning. That's why they're turning to these books".

=== Mein Kampf ===
A version of Adolf Hitler's Mein Kampf (わが闘争, Waga Tōsō) was published in October 2008. The book is Hitler's autobiography in which he outlines his Nazi political ideology. The manga version of Mein Kampf was a minor commercial success, selling 45,000 copies. However, it also proved to be controversial. The Financial Ministry of Bavaria which owns the copyright to the book and has refused to publish it in Germany issued a statement saying that manga was an inappropriate medium for Hitler's writing. Bavaria's former Japanese representative Toshio Obata stated: "Even 60 years after the end of war, Nazism remains a sensitive issue in Germany. Did East Press exhaust discussions before publishing it? Did it consider the difference between Japan and Germany as to how manga is viewed as a medium?" Maruo defended its publication, saying "Mein Kampf is a well-known book, but relatively few people have read it. We think this will provide clues about Hitler as a human being, as to his way of thinking that led to such tragedy, even though he was dismissed as a 'monster'". The publication of the manga helped reignite the debate in Germany as to whether the ban on the book should be lifted.

== International publications ==
Between November 2011 and November 2012, JManga made available online 14 Manga de Dokuha titles in English, namely No Longer Human, Das Kapital, The Strange Case of Dr. Jekyll and Mr. Hyde, Night on the Galactic Railroad, The Book of Five Rings, I Am a Cat, Seton's Wild Animals, Sutta Nipata, One Thousand and One Nights, The Metamorphosis, Journey to the West, In Search of Lost Time, The Art of War and The Narrow Road to the Deep North. One Peace Books also released Don Quixote, The Great Gatsby, Moby-Dick, Ulysses and The War of the Worlds as part of its "Manga Classic Readers" series on 1 September 2012. Canadian company Red Quill Books physically published Das Kapital in 2012 as Capital in Manga!.

From 2010 to 2011, War and Peace, Das Kapital (in 2 volumes), Les Misérables, On the Origin of Species, and Moby Dick were published in Dutch by the Belgian publisher EPO, translated from Japanese, under the title Graphic Classic. The covers have a paraphrased quote, in English: "A classic is something that everyone wants to have read and nobody wants to read."

The Spanish division of Verlag Herder publishes the series in the country since 2011. Thus Spoke Zarathustra, the Divine Comedy, The Prince, The Art of War, The Social Contract, Das Kapital, the Iliad and the Odyssey (in a single book), Nineteen Eighty-Four, The Antichrist, the Analects and Tao Te Ching are the eleven books published by the company.

In Brazil, Editora JBC published The Capital and King Lear in 2011. Two years later, L&PM Editores published The Art of War, The Great Gatsby, Hamlet, and Thus Spoke Zarathustra. Between 2013 and 2016, L&PM published the Manifesto of the Communist Party, The Metamorphosis, The Social Contract, The Brothers Karamazov, In Search of Lost Time, and Ulysses. A box containing The Brothers Karamazov, The Great Gatsby, The Metamorphosis and Thus Spoke Zarathustra was also released in 2015.

== List of entries ==
=== Manga de Dokuha (2007-2017, East Press) ===
Number	Title	Original author/editor	ISBN	Publication date
MD001	No Longer Human	Osamu Dazai	ISBN 978-4-87257-810-2; ISBN 978-4-7816-8631-8 (new edition)	August 2007; November 2020 (new edition)
MD002	The Broken Commandment	Tōson Shimazaki	ISBN 978-4-87257-812-6	August 2007
MD003	Kokoro	Natsume Sōseki	ISBN 978-4-87257-811-9; ISBN 978-4-7816-8630-1 (new edition)	August 2007; November 2020 (new edition)
MD004	Crime and Punishment	Fyodor Dostoyevsky	ISBN 978-4-87257-835-5	October 2007
MD005	"Rashōmon"	Ryūnosuke Akutagawa	ISBN 978-4-87257-834-8	October 2007
MD006	Kanikōsen	Takiji Kobayashi	ISBN 978-4-87257-836-2	October 2007
MD007	Night on the Galactic Railroad	Kenji Miyazawa	ISBN 978-4-87257-866-9	December 2007
MD008	War and Peace	Leo Tolstoy	ISBN 978-4-87257-867-6	December 2007
MD009	On Decadence and The Idiot	Ango Sakaguchi	ISBN 978-4-87257-868-3	December 2007
MD010	The Brothers Karamazov	Fyodor Dostoyevsky	ISBN 978-4-87257-889-8	February 2008
MD011	The Setting Sun	Osamu Dazai	ISBN 978-4-87257-890-4	February 2008
MD012	The Red and the Black	Stendhal	ISBN 978-4-87257-910-9	April 2008
MD013	An Encouragement of Learning	Fukuzawa Yukichi	ISBN 978-4-87257-909-3	April 2008
MD014	Bushido: The Soul of Japan	Nitobe Inazō	ISBN 978-4-87257-908-6	April 2008
MD015	The Metamorphosis	Franz Kafka	ISBN 978-4-87257-911-6	April 2008
MD016	King Lear	William Shakespeare	ISBN 978-4-87257-932-1	May 2008
MD017	Light and Darkness	Natsume Sōseki	ISBN 978-4-87257-933-8	May 2008
MD018	Night Flight	Antoine de Saint-Exupéry	ISBN 978-4-87257-973-4	July 2008
MD019	Faust	Johann Wolfgang von Goethe	ISBN 978-4-87257-974-1	July 2008
MD020	Thus Spoke Zarathustra	Friedrich Nietzsche	ISBN 978-4-87257-972-7	July 2008
MD021	Divine Comedy	Dante Alighieri	ISBN 978-4-7816-0002-4	October 2008
MD022	The Prince	Niccolò Machiavelli	ISBN 978-4-7816-0004-8	October 2008
MD023	"The Dancing Girl"	Mori Ōgai	ISBN 978-4-7816-0003-1	October 2008
MD024	Mein Kampf	Adolf Hitler	ISBN 978-4-7816-0011-6	November 2008
MD025	Dogra Magra	Yumeno Kyūsaku	ISBN 978-4-7816-0012-3	November 2008
MD026	The Possessed	Fyodor Dostoyevsky	ISBN 978-4-7816-0022-2	December 2008
MD027	Das Kapital	Karl Marx	ISBN 978-4-7816-0021-5; ISBN 978-4-7816-8629-5 (new edition)	December 2008; October 2020 (new edition)
MD028	The Sickness Unto Death	Søren Kierkegaard	ISBN 978-4-7816-0023-9	February 2009
MD029	Les Misérables	Victor Hugo	ISBN 978-4-7816-0024-6	February 2009
MD030	Moby-Dick	Herman Melville	ISBN 978-4-7816-0080-2	March 2009
MD031	The Great Gatsby	F. Scott Fitzgerald	ISBN 978-4-7816-0081-9	March 2009
MD032	The True Story of Ah Q	Lu Xun	ISBN 978-4-7816-0083-3	April 2009
MD033	Don Quixote	Miguel de Cervantes	ISBN 978-4-7816-0082-6	April 2009
MD034	Ulysses	James Joyce	ISBN 978-4-7816-0084-0	May 2009
MD035	Das Kapital, Volume II	Karl Marx, Friedrich Engels	ISBN 978-4-7816-0124-3	May 2009
MD036	In Search of Lost Time	Marcel Proust	ISBN 978-4-7816-0085-7	June 2009
MD037	Hagakure	Yamamoto Tsunetomo	ISBN 978-4-7816-0125-0	June 2009
MD038	The Origin of Species	Charles Darwin	ISBN 978-4-7816-0167-0	July 2009
MD039	The Merchant of Venice	William Shakespeare	ISBN 978-4-7816-0168-7	July 2009
MD040	Pandora's Box and Villon's Wife	Osamu Dazai	ISBN 978-4-7816-0201-1	August 2009
MD041	Sorekara	Natsume Sōseki	ISBN 978-4-7816-0200-4	August 2009
MD042	Water Margin	Shi Naian	ISBN 978-4-7816-0207-3	September 2009
MD043	Manifesto of the Communist Party	Karl Marx, Friedrich Engels	ISBN 978-4-7816-0208-0	September 2009
MD044	The Sorrows of Young Werther	Johann Wolfgang von Goethe	ISBN 978-4-7816-0220-2	October 2009
MD045	Macbeth	William Shakespeare	ISBN 978-4-7816-0221-9	October 2009
MD046	The Strange Case of Dr. Jekyll and Mr. Hyde	Robert Louis Stevenson	ISBN 978-4-7816-0241-7	November 2009
MD047	A Christmas Carol	Charles John Huffam Dickens	ISBN 978-4-7816-0242-4	November 2009
MD048	The Book of Five Rings	Miyamoto Musashi	ISBN 978-4-7816-0274-5	December 2009
MD049	A Fool's Life	Ryūnosuke Akutagawa	ISBN 978-4-7816-0275-2	December 2009
MD050	Kojiki		ISBN 978-4-7816-0276-9; ISBN 978-4-7816-8632-5 (new edition)	December 2009; November 2020 (new edition)
MD051	Nihon Shoki		ISBN 978-4-7816-0277-6; ISBN 978-4-7816-8633-2 (new edition)	January 2010; November 2020 (new edition)
MD052	The Tale of Genji	Murasaki Shikibu	ISBN 978-4-7816-0313-1	February 2010
MD053	The Life of an Amorous Man	Ihara Saikaku	ISBN 978-4-7816-0314-8	February 2010
MD054	Analects	Confucius	ISBN 978-4-7816-0325-4	March 2010
MD055	One Thousand and One Nights	Unknown	ISBN 978-4-7816-0326-1	March 2010
MD056	I Am a Cat	Natsume Sōseki	ISBN 978-4-7816-0347-6; ISBN 978-4-7816-8634-9 (new edition)	April 2010; December 2020 (new edition)
MD057	Byōshō Rokushaku	Masaoka Shiki	ISBN 978-4-7816-0348-3	April 2010
MD058	The War of the Worlds	Herbert George Wells	ISBN 978-4-7816-0363-6	May 2010
MD059	The Interpretation of Dreams and Introduction to Psychoanalysis	Sigmund Freud	ISBN 978-4-7816-0364-3	May 2010
MD060	Sutta Nipata	Unknown	ISBN 978-4-7816-0379-7	June 2010
MD061	Heart Sutra	Unknown	ISBN 978-4-7816-0380-3	June 2010
MD062	Analects Part II	Confucius	ISBN 978-4-7816-0381-0	July 2010
MD063	The Art of War	Sun Tzu	ISBN 978-4-7816-0382-7	July 2010
MD064	Seton's Wild Animals	Ernest Thompson Seton	ISBN 978-4-7816-0422-0	August 2010
MD065	Souvenirs entomologiques	Jean Henri Fabre	ISBN 978-4-7816-0423-7	August 2010
MD066	Gespräche mit Goethe	Johann Peter Eckermann	ISBN 978-4-7816-0443-5	September 2010
MD067	Human, All Too Human	Friedrich Nietzsche	ISBN 978-4-7816-0444-2	September 2010
MD068	Kama Sutra	Vātsyāyana	ISBN 978-4-7816-0458-9	October 2010
MD069	Journey to the West	Wu Cheng'en	ISBN 978-4-7816-0459-6	October 2010
MD070	The Antichrist	Friedrich Nietzsche	ISBN 978-4-7816-0469-5	November 2010
MD071	Black Death Hall Murders	Mushitaro Oguri	ISBN 978-4-7816-0470-1	November 2010
MD072	Old Testament	Various	ISBN 978-4-7816-0471-8	December 2010
MD073	New Testament	Various	ISBN 978-4-7816-0472-5; ISBN 978-4-7816-8627-1 (new edition)	December 2010; October 2020
MD074	The Book of Tea	Okakura Kakuzō	ISBN 978-4-7816-0522-7	January 2011
MD075	Commentarii de Bello Gallico	Julius Caesar	ISBN 978-4-7816-0523-4	January 2011
MD076	Hyakunin Isshu	Various	ISBN 978-4-7816-0533-3; ISBN 978-4-7816-0604-0 (new edition)	February 2011; April 2011 (new edition)
MD077	The Pillow Book	Sei Shōnagon	ISBN 978-4-7816-0534-0	February 2011
MD078	Analytical psychology and Psychology of the Unconscious	Carl Gustav Jung	ISBN 978-4-7816-0547-0	March 2011
MD079	Tsurezuregusa	Yoshida Kenkō	ISBN 978-4-7816-0548-7	March 2011
MD080	The Social Contract	Jean-Jacques Rousseau	ISBN 978-4-7816-0578-4	April 2011
MD081	Hamlet	William Shakespeare	ISBN 978-4-7816-0579-1	April 2011
MD082	Discourse on the Method	René Descartes	ISBN 978-4-7816-0593-7	May 2011
MD083	Records of Three Kingdoms	Chen Shou	ISBN 978-4-7816-0594-4	May 2011
MD084	The Narrow Road to the Deep North	Matsuo Bashō	ISBN 978-4-7816-0605-7	June 2011
MD085	The Lady of the Camellias	Alexandre Dumas	ISBN 978-4-7816-0606-4	June 2011
MD086	Alain on Happiness	Alain	ISBN 978-4-7816-0607-1	July 2011
MD087	On Liberty	John Stuart Mill	ISBN 978-4-7816-0608-8	July 2011
MD088	Yotsuya Kaidan	Unknown	ISBN 978-4-7816-0633-0	August 2011
MD089	Critique of Pure Reason	Immanuel Kant	ISBN 978-4-7816-0634-7	August 2011
MD090	Book of the Dead	Unknown	ISBN 978-4-7816-0635-4	September 2011
MD091	On War	Carl von Clausewitz	ISBN 978-4-7816-0636-1	September 2011
MD092	Notes from Underground	Fyodor Dostoyevsky	ISBN 978-4-7816-0668-2	October 2011
MD093	Resurrection	Leo Tolstoy	ISBN 978-4-7816-0669-9	October 2011
MD094	Iliad and Odyssey	Homer	ISBN 978-4-7816-0670-5	November 2011
MD095	Fathers and Sons	Ivan Turgenev	ISBN 978-4-7816-0671-2	November 2011
MD096	Paradise Lost	John Milton	ISBN 978-4-7816-0689-7	December 2011
MD097	The Wealth of Nations	Adam Smith	ISBN 978-4-7816-0690-3	December 2011
MD098	The Structure of "Iki"	Kuki Shūzō	ISBN 978-4-7816-0693-4	January 2012
MD099	The Chrysanthemum and the Sword	Ruth Benedict	ISBN 978-4-7816-0694-1	January 2012
MD100	Nineteen Eighty-Four	George Orwell	ISBN 978-4-7816-0726-9	February 2012
MD101	A Woman's Life	Guy de Maupassant	ISBN 978-4-7816-0727-6	February 2012
MD102	Constitution of Japan	Various	ISBN 978-4-7816-0744-3	March 2012
MD103	The Notebooks of Leonardo da Vinci	Leonardo da Vinci	ISBN 978-4-7816-0745-0	March 2012
MD104	Kaitai Shinsho	Sugita Genpaku	ISBN 978-4-7816-0746-7	April 2012
MD105	Tao Te Ching	Laozi	ISBN 978-4-7816-0747-4	April 2012
MD106	Anna Karenina	Leon Tolstoy	ISBN 978-4-7816-0768-9	May 2012
MD107	A Young Girl's Inferno	Yumeno Kyūsaku	ISBN 978-4-7816-0769-6	May 2012
MD108	History of Japan	Luís Fróis	ISBN 978-4-7816-0784-9	June 2012
MD109	Meditations	Marcus Aurelius	ISBN 978-4-7816-0785-6	June 2012
MD110	The Tale of the Heike	Unknown	ISBN 978-4-7816-0786-3	July 2012
MD111	Emile, or On Education	Jean-Jacques Rousseau	ISBN 978-4-7816-0787-0	July 2012
MD112	Ten Nights of Dreams	Natsume Sōseki	ISBN 978-4-7816-0820-4	August 2012
MD113	Tsugaru	Osamu Dazai	ISBN 978-4-7816-0821-1	August 2012
MD114	Autobiography of Heinrich Schliemann	Heinrich Schliemann	ISBN 978-4-7816-0831-0	September 2012
MD115	Two Years' Vacation	Jules Verne	ISBN 978-4-7816-0832-7	September 2012
MD116	"Lemon"	Motojirō Kajii	ISBN 978-4-7816-0849-5	October 2012
MD117	Futon	Katai Tayama	ISBN 978-4-7816-0850-1	November 2012
MD118	Yoake-mae	Tōson Shimazaki	ISBN 978-4-7816-0851-8	December 2012
MD119	Man'yōshū	Unknown	ISBN 978-4-7816-0852-5	January 2013
MD120	Beneath the Wheel	Hermann Hesse	ISBN 978-4-7816-0923-2	February 2013
MD121	Science as a Vocation and Politics as a Vocation	Max Weber	ISBN 978-4-7816-0924-9	March 2013
MD122	Apology	Plato	ISBN 978-4-7816-0956-0	April 2013
MD123	A Season in Hell	Arthur Rimbaud	ISBN 978-4-7816-0957-7	May 2013
MD124	The Count of Monte Cristo	Alexandre Dumas	ISBN 978-4-7816-0959-1	June 2013
MD125	The Sayings and Doings of Napoleon	Unknown	ISBN 978-4-7816-0958-4	July 2013
MD126	The Legends of Tono	Kunio Yanagita	ISBN 978-4-7816-0960-7	August 2013
MD127	Risshō Ankoku Ron	Nichiren	ISBN 978-4-7816-1071-9	October 2013
MD128	Records of the Grand Historian	Sima Qian	ISBN 978-4-7816-1096-2	December 2013
MD129	An Inquiry into the Good	Kitaro Nishida	ISBN 978-4-7816-1121-1	February 2014
MD130	Theory of relativity	Albert Einstein	ISBN 978-4-7816-1147-1	April 2014
MD131	A Study in Scarlet	Arthur Conan Doyle	ISBN 978-4-7816-1234-8	July 2014
MD132	"The Murders in the Rue Morgue"	Edgar Allan Poe	ISBN 978-4-7816-1257-7	October 2014
MD133	Quran	Unknown	ISBN 978-4-7816-1269-0	February 2015
MD134	The General Theory of Employment, Interest and Money	John Maynard Keynes	ISBN 978-4-7816-1338-3	June 2015
MD135	"Datsu-A Ron"	Fukuzawa Yukichi	ISBN 978-4-7816-1354-3	September 2015
MD136	Chijin no Ai	Jun'ichirō Tanizaki	ISBN 978-4-7816-1390-1	January 2016
MD137	Botchan	Natsume Sōseki	ISBN 978-4-7816-1463-2	August 2016
MD138	Caigentan	Hong Zicheng	ISBN 978-4-7816-1513-4	February 2017
MD139	Meisaku Koten Rakugo: Shibahama, Shinigami, Jugemu Hoka	Unknown	ISBN 978-4-7816-1577-6	August 2017

=== Kyōyō o Hirogeru Manga de Yomu Meicho (2015, East Press) ===
Number	Title	Original author/editor	ISBN	Publication date
MM1	Theory of relativity	Albert Einstein	ISBN 978-4-7816-1319-2	April 2015
MM2	An Encouragement of Learning	Fukuzawa Yukichi	ISBN 978-4-7816-1320-8	April 2015
MM3	The Origin of Species	Charles Darwin	ISBN 978-4-7816-1328-4	June 2015
MM4	Das Kapital	Karl Marx	ISBN 978-4-7816-1329-1	June 2015

=== Manga de Dokuha Junior Series (2023, Gakken) ===
Number	Title	Original author/editor	ISBN	Publication date
1	Kanikōsen	Takiji Kobayashi	ISBN 978-4-05-205752-6	September 2023
2	Night on the Galactic Railroad	Kenji Miyazawa	ISBN 978-4-05-205777-9	September 2023
3	Journey to the West		ISBN 978-4-05-205794-6	October 2023
4	Kokoro	Natsume Sōseki	ISBN 978-4-05-205795-3	October 2023
5	The Tale of Genji	Murasaki Shikibu	ISBN 978-4-05-205862-2	December 2023
6	A Christmas Carol	Charles John Huffam Dickens	ISBN 978-4-05-205861-5	December 2023
