= Red Quill Books =

Canadian publisher

- Founded: 2009
- Founder: George S. Rigakos
- Country of origin: Canada
- Headquarters location: Ottawa, Ontario
- Distribution: Worldwide by Ingram Content Group and Brunswick Books in Canada
- Publication types: Books
- Nonfiction topics: Radical comic books and Social Science texts
- Official website: www.redquillbooks.com

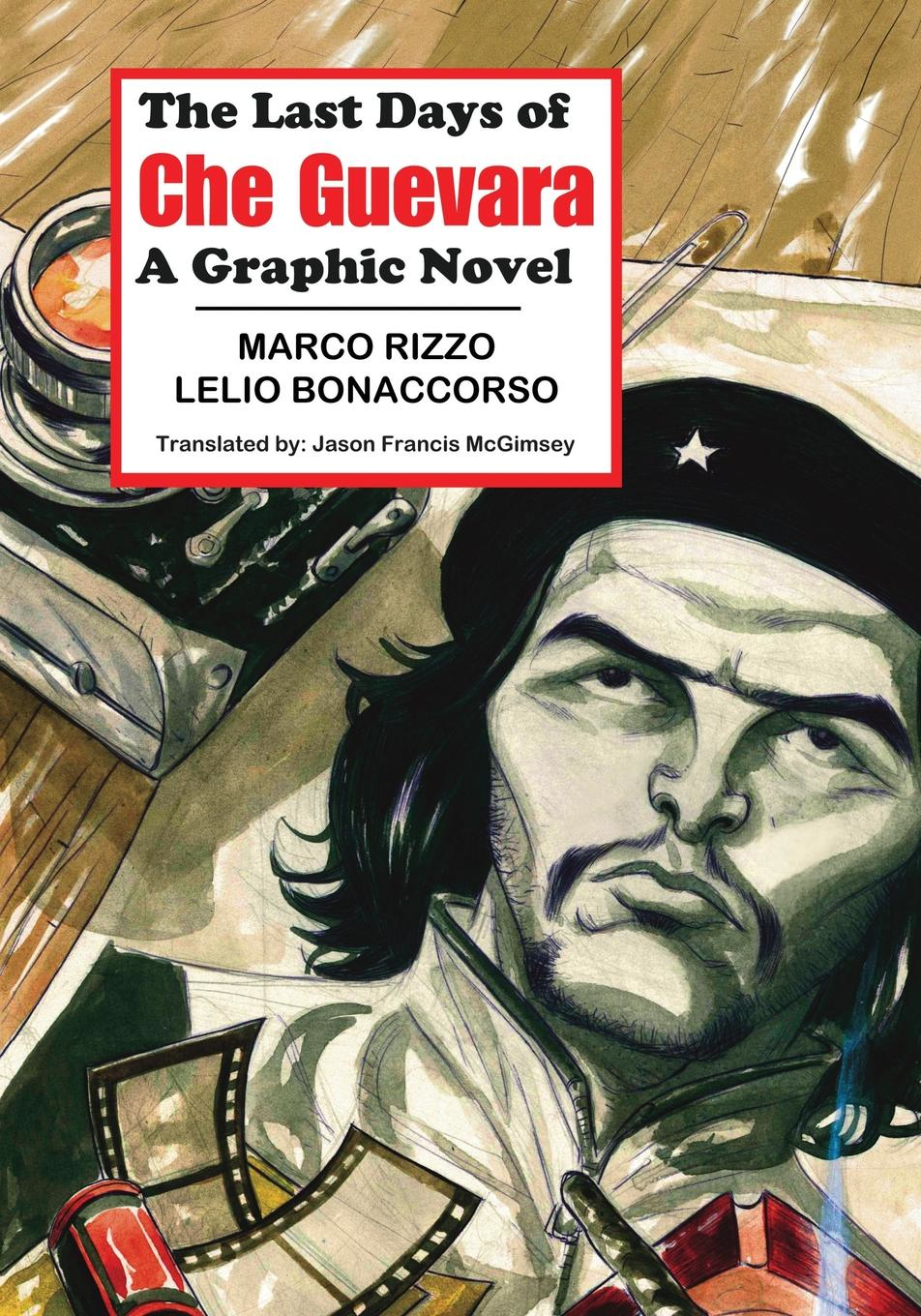

Red Quill Books was founded in 2009 by a group of scholars led by professor George S. Rigakos, based out of Carleton University in Ottawa, Canada. The press, however, has no formal association with Carleton University. The primary mission of the press is to create a venue for reanimating classic, radical texts through comic book or manga formats aimed at a new generation of student, faculty and general readers. Red Quill Books has also sought to develop as sizable catalogue of critical academic books. A founding principle of the press is to funnel a portion of its revenues toward student scholarships in order to support future critical research.

== Early notoriety ==
A year after its launch, Red Quill Books earned some early notoriety for its four-part Communist Manifesto Illustrated series which elicited attention in North America. Red Quill Books has followed this with the release of Capital in Manga which is the English translation of the Manga de Dokuha version produced by East Press, and The Last Days of Che Guevara, derived from the Italian comic entitled Que Viva El Che Guevara.

== Notable releases ==
- Mark, Karl and Frederik Engels. Edited by: George S. Rigakos. Illustrated by Victor Serra. (2010) The Communist Manifesto Illustrated. Chapter One – Historical Materialism. Ottawa: Red Quill Books ISBN 978-1-926958-02-6
- Marx, Karl. Edited by: Variety Artworks. Translated by: Guy Yasko. Capital in Manga! Ottawa: Red Quill Books ISBN 978-1-926958-19-4
- Rizzo, Marco and Lelio Bonaccorso (Illustrator). (2014) The Last Days of Che Guevara: A Graphic Novel Ottawa: Red Quill Books ISBN 978-1-926958-30-9
