= Howard Caygill =

British philosopher (born 1958)

- Born: 1958 (age 67–68)

Education
- Education: University of Sussex (PhD, 1982)
- Thesis: Aesthetics and Civil Society: Theories of Art and Society 1640–1790 (1982)
- Doctoral advisor: Gillian Rose

Philosophical work
- School: Continental philosophy Critical theory
- Institutions: Kingston University, University of East Anglia, Goldsmiths, University of London
- Main interests: Political philosophy, 20th-century philosophy, aesthetics

Howard Caygill (born 1958) is a British philosopher.

== Biography ==
He has held the position of Professor of Modern European Philosophy at the Centre for Research in Modern European Philosophy (CRMEP) – Kingston University since 2011. Previously he had taught at University of East Anglia and Goldsmiths College, University of London.

He is known for his work on Walter Benjamin, Immanuel Kant, Emmanuel Levinas, and Franz Kafka; and concepts such as resistance have influenced fields including political philosophy, aesthetics, literary theory and continental philosophy.

Jay Bernstein has described Caygill as "one of the two or three leading practitioners and exponents of European philosophy in the UK". He contributes to a diversity of academic journals, among them being the Oxford Literary Review, photographies, Philosophy Today, Philosophical Journal of Conflict and Violence, Organization Studies, Journal for Cultural Research, Parallax, Études Phénoménologiques, and Angelaki.

Caygill is the Literary Executor of the estate of Gillian Rose, who was his supervisor at the University of Sussex.

== Bibliography ==
=== Books ===
- Caygill, Howard (2020). Force and understanding: essays on philosophy and resistance. London: Bloomsbury Academic. ISBN 978-1-350-10786-1
- Caygill, Howard (2017). Kafka: in light of the accident. London: Bloomsbury Academic. ISBN 978-1-4725-9542-3
- Caygill, Howard (2013). On resistance: a philosophy of defiance. London: Bloomsbury. ISBN 978-1-4725-2258-0
- Caygill, Howard (2002). Levinas and the political. London: Routledge. ISBN 978-0-415-11248-2
- Caygill, Howard (1998). Walter Benjamin: the colour of experience. London: Routledge. ISBN 0-415-08958-1
- Caygill, Howard (1995). A Kant dictionary. Oxford: Blackwell. ISBN 978-0-631-17535-3
- Caygill, Howard (1989). Art of judgment. Oxford: Blackwell. ISBN 978-0-631-16596-5
