= Socialist Studies Bulletin =

- Discipline: Interdisciplinary
- Language: English, French

Publication details
- History: 1985–2005
- Publisher: Society for Socialist Studies (Canada)

Standard abbreviations
- ISO 4: Social. Stud. Bull.

Indexing
- ISSN: 0830-9086

The Socialist Studies Bulletin was published by the Society for Socialist Studies and contained membership news and updates as well as academic articles and commentaries. It was started in 1985, replacing Newsletter, which was launched in 1979. The Bulletin ceased publication in 2005 and it was replaced by Socialist Studies/Études Socialistes. The headquarters was in Winnipeg.
