= Jay Bernstein (philosopher) =

American philosopher

- Born: Jay M. Bernstein; 1947 (age 78–79)

Academic background
- Education: University of Edinburgh (PhD)
- Thesis: Kant and Transcendental Realism (1975)
- Doctoral advisor: W. H. Walsh

Academic work
- Era: Contemporary philosophy
- Region: Western philosophy
- School or tradition: Continental
- Institutions: The New School for Social Research
- Main interests: German idealism Critical theory

Jay M. Bernstein (born 1947) is an American philosopher holding the position of University Distinguished Professor at The New School.

== Life and work ==
He studied at Trinity College (B.A., 1970) and the University of Edinburgh (Ph.D., 1975), presenting the thesis "Kant and transcendental realism".

Bernstein taught at the Department of Philosophy at the University of Essex in the UK from 1975 to 2001. For much of his 25-year tenure there, he served as the head of the department, and among his fellow faculty members were distinguished academics Peter Dews, Simon Critchley and Alexander García Düttmann. His key publications, The Fate of Art (1992) and Adorno: Disenchantment and Ethics (2001), were written and published while he was at Essex. He left Essex in 2001 to join the New School for Social Research in New York, where he has since served as a University Distinguished Professor of Philosophy.

Bernstein is an expert in continental philosophy and a leading interpreter of the philosophy of Theodor W. Adorno. According to Espen Hammer, Bernstein situates Adorno "in the middle of contemporary philosophical debate in ethics," and follows him in arguing that "genuine ethical responsiveness must be sought for in the repressed margins of society".

Bernstein has published two books on art, The Fate of Art and Against Voluptuous Bodies: Late Modernism and the Meaning of Painting. In an interview with the Brooklyn Rail following these publications, Bernstein stated that "the modern rationality that creates modern science, that creates the capitalist economy, that creates bureaucratic rationality, needs to get rid of sensuous materiality, concreteness, and the experience of those things."

Bernstein was a 2013 Berlin Prize Fellow at the American Academy in Berlin.

He is a co-editor of the journal Critical Horizons.

Bernstein is known for his lectures on Kant and Hegel, some of which have been recorded as part of the project The Bernstein Tapes.

== Books ==
- The Philosophy of the Novel: Lukács, Marxism and the Dialectics of Form. The Harvester Press, 1984.
- Recovering Ethical Life: Jurgen Habermas and the future of Critical Theory. Routledge, 1995.
- The Fate of Art: Aesthetic Alienation from Kant to Derrida and Adorno. Pennsylvania State University Press, 1992.
- Adorno: Disenchantment and Ethics. Cambridge University Press, 2001.
- Against Voluptuous Bodies: Late Modernism and the Meaning of Painting. Stanford University Press, 2006.
- Torture and Dignity: An Essay on Moral Injury. University of Chicago Press, 2015.
- Political Concepts: A Critical Lexicon. Fordham University Press, 2018.
