= Between the Lines Books =

Canadian publishing house

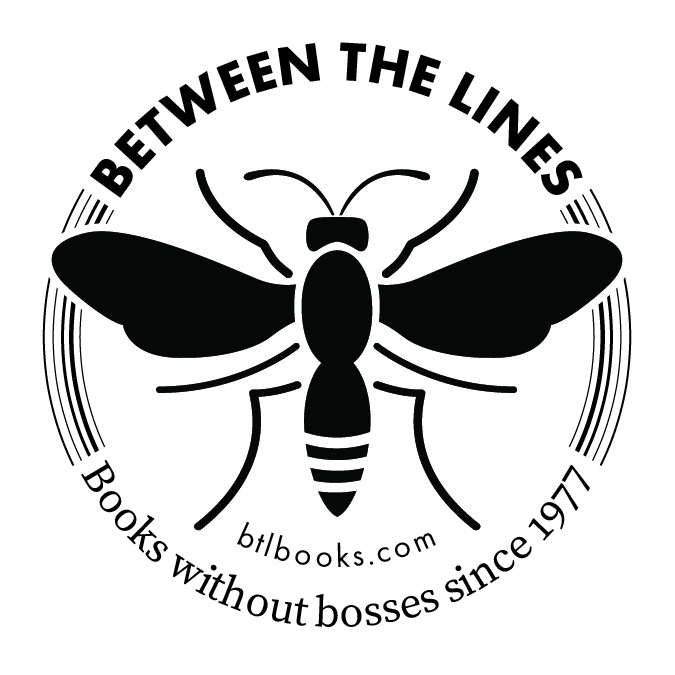
- Status: Active
- Founded: 1977
- Country of origin: Canada
- Headquarters location: Toronto
- Distribution: University of Toronto Press Distribution
- Key people: Jamie Swift, Dinah Forbes, Ken Epps, Kae Elgie, Robert Clarke, Steve Izma, Richard Swift, Jonathan Barker
- Publication types: Books
- Nonfiction topics: politics, public policy, social issues, history, critical race, international development, Indigenous peoples, gender and sexuality, health, culture, adult and popular education, labour, environment, technology, media
- No. of employees: 5
- Official website: www.btlbooks.com

Between the Lines (BTL) is an independent Toronto-based publisher of non-fiction, most of which offers a critical perspective on culture, economics, and society. Since its inception in 1977, BTL has published approximately 250 titles of which more than half are maintained in print, including seminal works by Indigenous activists Arthur Manuel and Katsi'tsakwas Ellen Gabriel, critical historians Karen Dubinsky and Ian McKay, feminist geographer Leslie Kern, and American cultural theorist bell hooks. In 2012, BTL won the Wilson Prize for Publishing Canadian History.

Over the course of its history, BTL has published titles on politics, public policy, labour, critical race, international development, Indigenous peoples, gender and sexuality, history, health, adult and popular education, environment, technology, and media.

== Organization ==
Unlike most publishing houses, Between the Lines is a co-operative organization. Its tagline is "Books without bosses since 1977". There is no individual owner or publisher, and organizational decisions are reached by consensus. Publishing decisions are made by a volunteer editorial board.

== Affiliates ==
BTL was formerly represented in the college and trade markets throughout Canada by Brunswick Books, and is now distributed by University of Toronto Press Distribution. In the U.S., BTL is distributed by AK Press. In the U.K. and continental Europe, sales representation and distribution are provided by Global Book Marketing and Central Books respectively. BTL has co-publishing arrangements with New Internationalist (UK), Pluto Press, South End Press, PM Press, Haymarket, O/R Books, Zed Books, and LUX Editeur.
