= Inanna Publications =

Canadian book publisher

- Status: Active
- Founded: 1978
- Founder: Shelagh Wilkinson
- Country of origin: Canada
- Headquarters location: Founders College, Toronto
- Distribution: Brunswick Books, Small Press Distribution
- Key people: Luciana Ricciutelli (Editor-in-Chief), Brenda Cranney (President), Angela Miles (Vice President)
- Publication types: Books
- Official website: www.inanna.ca

Inanna Publications and Education Inc. is a Canadian book publisher based in Toronto, Ontario. Inanna publishes women's writing, including a journal, literary fiction, poetry, and academic books. Inanna's books are on a wide variety of feminist topics. Most of Inanna Publications' books are collected at Harvard Library. Inanna's writers have won Independent Publisher Book Awards and Canadian Jewish Book Awards, and have been shortlisted for the League of Canadian Poets's Raymond Souster Award, the Western Mail (Wales) Book of the Year, the Lambda Literary Foundation awards, and have been among the Toronto Book Award finalists.

== History ==
Founded in 1978, Inanna Publications—whose name is related to Inanna, Goddess of Love, Wisdom, War, Fertility and Lust—started to publish an academic journal and books. In 2004, it launched the Inanna Poetry and Fiction Series.

Inanna is the publisher for Canadian Woman Studies/Les Cahiers de la Femme, which is one of Canada’s oldest feminist journals.

Its books are distributed by Brunswick Books for Canada and Small Press Distribution for the United States.
