= Radical Philosophy =

- Discipline: Political science, women's studies
- Language: English
- Edited by: Editorial collective

Publication details
- History: 1972–present
- Publisher: Radical Philosophy Collective (United Kingdom)
- Frequency: Triannually
- Open access: Yes
- License: CC BY-NC-ND
- Impact factor: 1.952 (2020)

Standard abbreviations
- ISO 4: Radic. Philos.

Indexing
- ISSN: 0300-211X (print); 0300-211X (web)
- LCCN: 73640703
- OCLC no.: 643567101

Links
- Journal homepage; Online archive

Radical Philosophy is a triannual peer-reviewed academic journal of critical theory and philosophy. It was established in 1972 with the purpose of providing a forum for the theoretical work which was emerging in the wake of the radical movements of the 1960s, in philosophy and other fields. The journal is edited by an "editorial collective".

== Content ==
Besides academic articles, the journal publishes book reviews and usually some news and at least one commentary on matters of topical interest. Although not associated with any specific left-wing position, the journal is subtitled "Journal of Socialist and Feminist Philosophy" and has been broadly associated with the New Left. Editors of the journal since the early 1970s have included Marxists and feminists.

== Abstracting and indexing ==
The journal is abstracted and indexed in:

- EBSCO databases
- Philosopher's Index
- ProQuest databases
- Scopus
- Social Sciences Citation Index
- Sociological Abstracts

According to the Journal Citation Reports, the journal has a 2020 impact factor of 1.952.

== See also ==
- List of ethics journals
- List of women's studies journals
