= Roger Scruton bibliography =

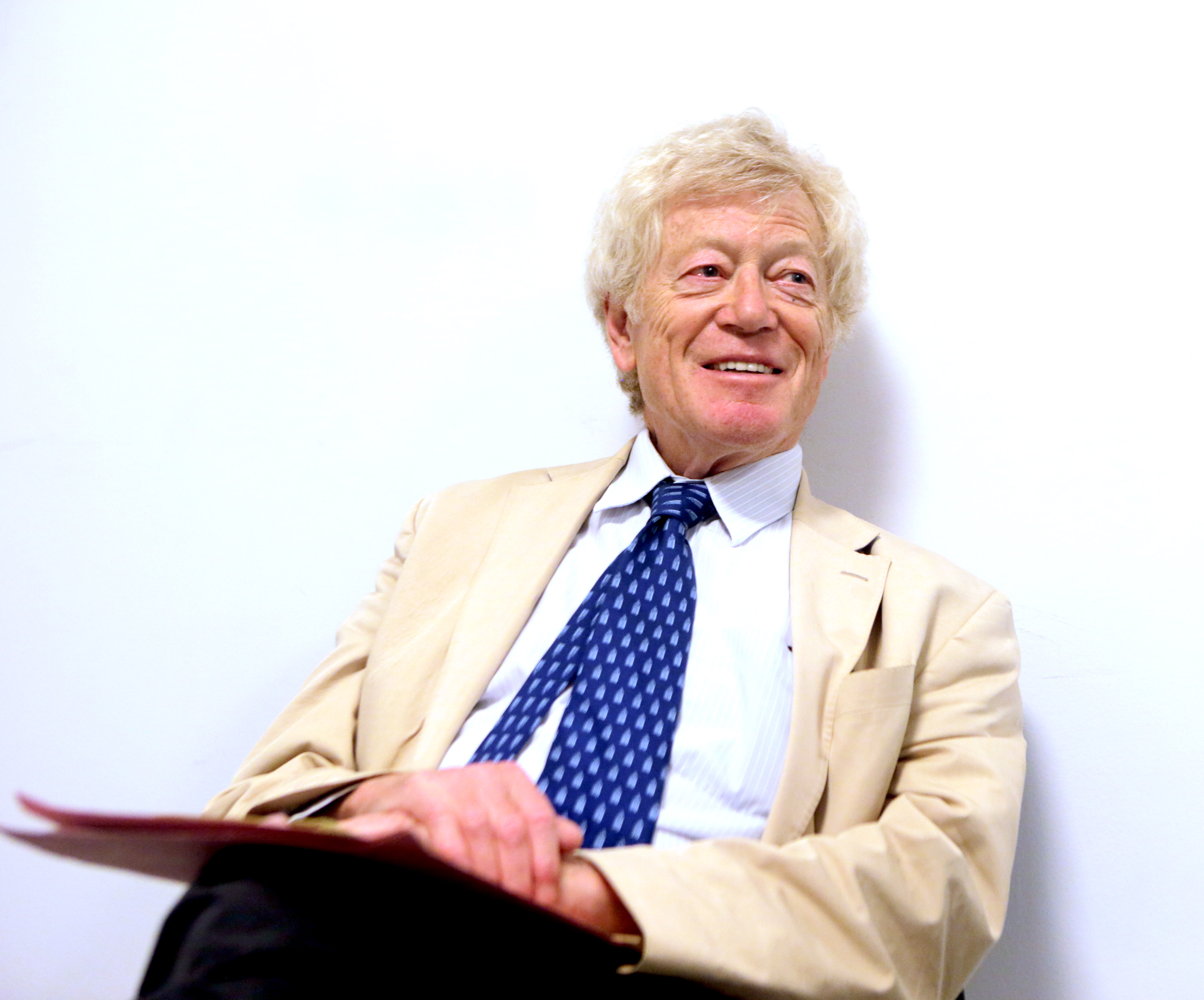
Roger Scruton in 2019

This is a list of the published works of English philosopher Roger Scruton.

== Books ==
=== Non-fiction ===
- Art and Imagination (1974)
- The Aesthetics of Architecture (1979)
- The Meaning of Conservatism (1980)
- The Politics of Culture and Other Essays (1981)
- A Short History of Modern Philosophy (1981)
- A Dictionary of Political Thought (1982)
- The Aesthetic Understanding (1983)
- Kant (1983)
- Untimely Tracts (1985)
- Thinkers of the New Left (1985)
- Sexual Desire: A Moral Philosophy of the Erotic (1986)
- Spinoza (1986) republished as Spinoza: A Very Short Introduction (2002)
- A Land Held Hostage: Lebanon and the West (1987)
- The Philosopher on Dover Beach and Other Essays (1989)
- Conservative Texts (1992)
- Modern Philosophy: An Introduction and Survey (1994)
- The Classical Vernacular: Architectural Principles in an Age of Nihilism (1995)
- Animal Rights and Wrongs (1996)
- An Intelligent Person's Guide to Philosophy (1996); republished in 2005 as Philosophy: Principles and Problems
- The Aesthetics of Music (1997)
- An Intelligent Person's Guide to Modern Culture (1998)
- On Hunting (1998)
- England: An Elegy (2001)
- The West and the Rest: Globalisation and the Terrorist Threat (2002)
- Death-Devoted Heart: Sex and the Sacred in Wagner's Tristan und Isolde (Oxford University Press, 2004)
- News from Somewhere: On Settling (2004)
- The Need for Nations (2004)
- Gentle Regrets: Thoughts from a Life (Continuum, 2005)
- Animal Rights and Wrongs (2006)
- A Political Philosophy: Arguments for Conservatism (2006)
- Immigration, Multiculturalism and the Need to Defend the Nation State (2006)
- Culture Counts: Faith and Feeling in a World Besieged (Encounter Books, 2007)
- Dictionary of Political Thought (2007)
- Beauty (2009)
- I Drink Therefore I Am: A Philosopher's Guide to Wine (2009)
- Understanding Music (2009)
- The Uses of Pessimism: And the Danger of False Hope (2010)
- Beauty: A Very Short Introduction (Oxford University Press, 2011) ISBN 9780199229758
- Green Philosophy (2011)
- The Roger Scruton Reader (2011)
- How to Think Seriously About the Planet: The Case for an Environmental Conservatism (2012)
- The Face of God: The Gifford Lectures (2012)
- Our Church: A Personal History of the Church of England (2012)
- The Soul of the World (2014)
- How to Be a Conservative (2014)
- Fools, Frauds and Firebrands: Thinkers of the New Left (2015)
- The Ring of Truth: The Wisdom of Wagner's Ring of the Nibelung (2016)
- Conversations with Roger Scruton (Notting Hill Editions, 2016) ISBN 9781910749128
- Confessions of a Heretic: Selected Essays (2016)
- On Human Nature (2017)
- Conservatism: Ideas in Profile (2017) ISBN 9781781257524
- Where We Are: The State of Britain Now (2017)
- Conservatism: An Invitation to the Great Tradition (2018)
- Music as an Art (2018)
- Living with Beauty (2020)
- Wagner's Parsifal: The Music of Redemption (Penguin, 2020) ISBN 9780857423498
- Against the Tide: The Best of Roger Scruton's columns, commentaries and criticism (2022)

=== Fiction ===
- Fortnight's Anger: a novel (1981)
- Francesca: a novel (1991)
- A Dove Descending and Other Stories (1991)
- Xanthippic Dialogues (1993)
- Perictione in Colophon (2000)
- Notes from Underground (2014)
- The Disappeared (2015)
- Souls in the Twilight (2018)

== Articles ==
- Scruton, Roger (4 January 2014). "The right way : we need conservatism now more than ever". The Spectator. 324 (9671): 14.
- Scruton, Roger (2014). "Why I became a conservative". The New Criterion. 21 (6): 4.

== Opera ==
- The Minister (1994)
- Violet (2005)

== Poetry ==
- Be Attitudes (1997)

== Television ==
- Why Beauty Matters (BBC 2009).
