= Notes from the Underground =

Notes from the Underground or Notes from Underground may refer to:

== Literature ==
- Notes from Underground, an 1864 novel by Fyodor Dostoyevsky
- Notes from the Underground (creative writing paper), a free daily paper in London launched in 2007
- Notes from Underground (Scruton novel), a 2014 novel by Roger Scruton
- Notes from the Underground, an underground newspaper in Dallas, Texas, later renamed Dallas Notes
- Notes from Underground, a play by Eric Bogosian

== Music ==
- Notes from Underground (1997 album), a 2009 album by American band 1997
- Notes from the Underground (Medeski Martin & Wood album), 1992
- Notes from the Underground (Hollywood Undead album), 2013
- Notes from the Underground, a 2001 album by Clan of Xymox
- Notes from the Underground, a 2008 album by Elliott Murphy
- "Notes from the Underground", a song from Sarah Slean's 2008 album The Baroness
- Notes from the Underground, a 2020 album by High Contrast

== Other uses ==
- "Notes from the Underground", 1967 alternative radio program hosted by author Tom Robbins on KRAB-FM, in Seattle
- “Notes from the Underground” a three-part episode story arc of the 2003 Teenage Mutant Ninja Turtles series

== See also ==
- Notes from Thee Underground, a 1994 album by Pigface
