= Thinkers of the New Left =

1985 book by Roger Scruton

- Cover
- Author: Roger Scruton
- Language: English
- Subject: New Left
- Publisher: Longman
- Publication date: 1985
- Publication place: United Kingdom
- Media type: Print (Hardcover and Paperback)
- Pages: 227
- ISBN: 0-582-90273-8

Thinkers of the New Left is a book by the conservative English philosopher Roger Scruton published by Longman in 1985, in which the author harshly criticizes the writings of authors he considers as representative of the New Left. The book proved controversial and, according to Scruton, its reception damaged his academic career. Some of the material in the book appeared in reworked form in a 2015 book titled Fools, Frauds and Firebrands: Thinkers of the New Left.

== Summary ==
According to Scruton, he was motivated to write Thinkers of the New Left by his experiences in Czechoslovakia under the communist regime, where he worked with the Jan Hus Educational Foundation and attempted to smuggle forbidden literature into the country. Scruton was angered by what he saw as "excuses for the Gulag" made by scholars such as the historian Eric Hobsbawm.

The volume is a collection of essays on fourteen authors who Scruton considers as representatives of the New Left, namely E. P. Thompson, Ronald Dworkin, Michel Foucault, R. D. Laing, Raymond Williams, Rudolf Bahro, Antonio Gramsci, Louis Althusser, Immanuel Wallerstein, Jürgen Habermas, Perry Anderson, György Lukács, John Kenneth Galbraith and Jean-Paul Sartre. Most of those had earlier appeared in the British conservative magazine The Salisbury Review then edited by Scruton; only the chapter on Laing had been published in The Cambridge Review.

In addition to individual chapters on these authors, an introduction and a conclusion provide a general overview of left-wing thought and its social and political significance. Scruton argues that during the 1960s and 1970s, the thinkers he discusses helped to create an "oppositional consensus", and that due to its influence "it ceased to be respectable to defend the customs, institutions, and policy of western states". Scruton sees the New Left as the most recent expression of a force that has been prominent in politics since the beginning of the French Revolution. According to him, left-wing movements are often led by fanatics, whose rhetoric he compares to that of Maximilien Robespierre.

According to Scruton, while the theories of Karl Marx "have been essentially refuted" by authors such as the sociologist Max Weber, the economists Eugen Böhm von Bawerk, Ludwig von Mises, and Friedrich Hayek, and the philosopher Karl Popper, the New Left has failed to respond to Marx's critics with "anything more persuasive than a sneer", even though the major New Left thinkers depend on the central claims of Marxism. In Scruton's view, this demonstrates that the New Left does not have "a system of rationally held beliefs", and is dependent on never questioned assumptions. Scruton praises the philosopher Leszek Kołakowski's Main Currents of Marxism (1976–1978).

== Fools, Frauds and Firebrands: Thinkers of the New Left ==
Most of the book's chapters were reworked by Scruton in a book titled Fools, Frauds and Firebrands: Thinkers of the New Left published by Bloomsbury in 2015. This new version does not include the chapters on Laing and Bahro, who Scruton believed "have nothing to say to us today", but contained additional chapters on Eric Hobsbawm, Jacques Lacan, Gilles Deleuze, Edward Said, Alain Badiou, and Slavoj Žižek.

== Reception ==
Thinkers of the New Left was reviewed by John Dunn in The Times Literary Supplement, and Dennis O'Keeffe in Modern Age. Colin Crouch argued in The Political Quarterly that Scruton often resorts to personal attacks, such as calling J.K. Galbraith a "parasite". Crouch also describes Scruton as "paranoid" with a "Manichean conservatism" which equates all criticism of the West with allegiance to the Soviets and compares dry writing styles to Stalinist crimes.

Looking back on Thinkers of the New Left in 2015, Scruton wrote that because the book was published while Margaret Thatcher was Prime Minister and he, then teaching at a university, was known as a prominent opponent of the British Left, it was "greeted with derision and outrage", and its publication marked "the beginning of the end" for his university career and led to attacks on his character and on all of his works, regardless of whether they dealt with politics. According to Scruton, an academic philosopher wrote to Longman, the book's publisher, that Longman had been "tarnished by association" with Scruton's work, and one of Longman's best-selling educational writers threatened to "take his products elsewhere if the book stayed in print". Scruton writes that copies of Thinkers of the New Left were removed from bookshops as a result.

The journalist Tim Adams, writes that underground copies of Thinkers of the New Left were distributed in the former Czechoslovakia after the book's withdrawal in Britain, while according to Scruton, "samizdat editions" of the book appeared in both Czech and Polish, and it was subsequently translated into Chinese, Korean and Portuguese. Adams describes Thinkers of the New Left as "a closely argued attack on what Scruton saw as the prevailing fundamentalism of his world, the grip of Marxist and post-Marxist thinking within Britain’s universities."
