= People's rebellion =

People's rebellion may refer to:

- The Hmong people's rebellion led by Zhong Xang Yajiaumo
- The Qiang people's rebellion, a reaction to reforms and policies during the Han dynasty
- A description of war in the novel "Notes from Underground" by Fyodor Dostoyevsky
