= Modern Philosophy: An Introduction and Survey =

1994 book by Roger Scruton

- Author: Roger Scruton
- Language: English
- Subject: modern philosophy
- Publisher: Penguin Books, Sinclair-Stevenson
- Publication date: 1994
- Publication place: United Kingdom
- Media type: Print
- Pages: 596
- ISBN: 978-0140249071

Modern Philosophy: An Introduction and Survey is a 1994 book by the English philosopher Roger Scruton, in which the author tries to "acquaint the reader with the principal arguments, concepts and questions of modern philosophy, as this subject is taught in English-speaking universities."

== Reception ==
The book has been reviewed by Anthony O'Hear, Jane O'Grady and Steven Ross.
