= Kant (book) =

1982 book by Roger Scruton

- Author: Roger Scruton
- Language: English
- Subject: Kant
- Publisher: Oxford University Press
- Publication date: 1981, 2nd edition 2001
- Publication place: United Kingdom
- Media type: Print
- ISBN: 9781536664966

Kant is a 1982 book by the English philosopher Roger Scruton, in which the author provides an introduction to Kant's philosophy.

== Reception ==
The book has been reviewed by David Whewell and Alexander Broadie.

Roger J. Sullivan lists the book as one of the "fine brief overviews of Kant's moral theory".
