= Montpelier (Sperryville, Virginia) =

Historic house in Virginia, United States

- U.S. National Register of Historic Places
- Virginia Landmarks Register
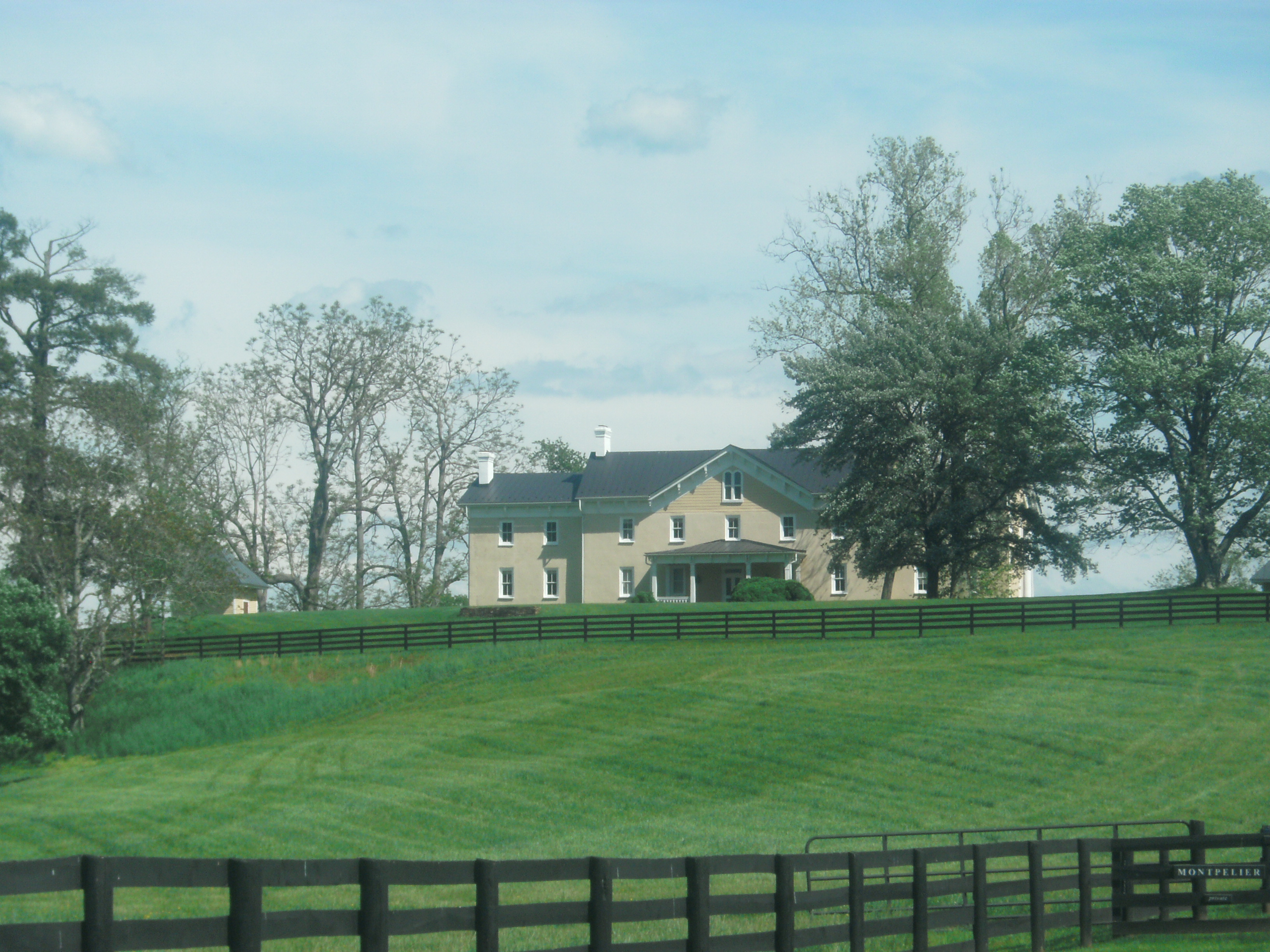
- Montpelier in May 2016

- Location within Virginia Location within the United States
- Location: South of Sperryville on VA 231, near Sperryville, Virginia
- Coordinates: 38°35′16″N 78°13′48″W
- Area: 400 acres (160 ha)
- Built: c. 1750
- NRHP reference No.: 73002052
- VLR No.: 078-0028

Significant dates
- Added to NRHP: April 11, 1973
- Designated VLR: January 16, 1973

Montpelier is a historic plantation house located near Sperryville, Rappahannock County, Virginia. The main house was built about 1750, and is a two-story, 11 bay, stuccoed stone and brick dwelling with a side gable roof. It consists of a five-bay main block with north and south three bay wings. It features a two-story verandah stretching the entire length of the house with eight large provincial Tuscan order columns. The property also includes the contributing smokehouse, storage house, and a frame cabin. It was added to the National Register of Historic Places in 1973.

From 2004 to 2009, Montpelier was owned by English conservative philosopher Sir Roger Scruton.
