= Dennis O'Keeffe =

Dennis O'Keeffe

Dennis O'Keeffe (1939–2014) was an English professor of social science at the University of Buckingham and editor of the Salisbury Review. He was Education and Welfare Fellow at the Institute of Economic Affairs. In addition, he served on the advisory boards of both the Social Affairs Unit, and FOREST, the smoker's rights campaign. He died on 16 December 2014.
