= A Short History of Modern Philosophy =

1981 book by Roger Scruton

- Author: Roger Scruton
- Language: English
- Subject: history of modern philosophy
- Publisher: Routledge
- Publication date: 1981, 2nd edition 1995
- Publication place: United Kingdom
- Media type: Print (Hardcover and Paperback)
- ISBN: 0-415-13327-0

A Short History of Modern Philosophy: From Descartes to Wittgenstein is a 1982 book by the English philosopher Roger Scruton, in which the author provides a history of modern philosophy. The second revised and enlarged edition was published in 1995. Scruton examines the thoughts of Descartes, Spinoza, Leibniz, Hobbes, Locke, Berkeley, Hume, Kant, Hegel, Schopenhauer, Kierkegaard, Marx, Nietzsche, Mill, Frege, Husserl, Heidegger and Wittgenstein among others.

== Reception ==
The book has been reviewed in Philosophy in Review, Mind and Studia Leibnitiana. George Henry Radcliffe Parkinson calls it a "lucid and intelligent guide to the history of modern philosophy." Anthony Manser points out that Scruton reveals his commitment to analytic tradition and is clearly out of sympathy with philosophers like Heidegger and Sartre. William Day (from Le Moyne College) criticizes the book's "parochialism" and believes that it has a bias towards British thinkers. The book has also received positive reviews from L. Gordon Graham and Alan Ryan.
