= The Soul of the World =

2014 book by Roger Scruton

- Cover of the first edition
- Author: Roger Scruton
- Language: English
- Subject: The sacred
- Publisher: Princeton University Press
- Publication date: 2014
- Publication place: United States
- Media type: Print (Hardcover and Paperback)
- Pages: 216
- ISBN: 9780691161570

The Soul of the World is a 2014 book by the English philosopher Roger Scruton.

== Summary ==
The author argues for the reality of a transcendent dimension, and maintains that the experience of the sacred plays a decisive role even in a secular society. Scruton supports the concept of "cognitive dualism", which means that a human can be explained both as a physical organism, and as a subjective person who relates to the world through concepts which do not belong in the physical sciences, and without which it would not be possible to understand human life.

== Publication history ==
The Soul of the World was first published by Princeton University Press in 2014.

== Reception ==
Marcus Tanner reviewed the book in The Independent:

Lest any vicar feel tempted to pick up this book in search of inspiration for Sunday sermons, it should be pointed out that Scruton doesn't have much to say specifically about God or Christianity, except at the end. What he mostly defends in these essays is a thinking person's right to say no to a boiled-down Darwinism that reduces all relationships to contracts and all human behaviour and emotions to biological selection and adaptation. ... Scruton argues persuasively that much of what passes for scientific fact today is just the latest fashion in physics. But one wonders who would find this eloquent plea on behalf of the right to interpret things in various ways objectionable.

The book was also reviewed in The New Criterion, The Oxonian Review Prospect, The Financial Times, The Times Literary Supplement

== See also ==
- Lifeworld
