= Why Beauty Matters =

- Written by: Roger Scruton
- Directed by: Louise Lockwood
- Starring: Roger Scruton
- Country of origin: United Kingdom
- Original language: English

Production
- Producer: Andrew Lockyer
- Editor: Enda Mullen
- Running time: 59 minutes

Original release
- Network: BBC Two
- Release: 28 November 2009

Why Beauty Matters is a 2009 British documentary film written and presented by the philosopher Roger Scruton. Scruton argues for the importance and transcendental nature of beauty.

The film was a part of BBC's project Modern Beauty Season, which consisted of a number of programmes on the topic of beauty and modernity, broadcast during November and December 2009. Why Beauty Matters premiered on BBC Two on 28 November 2009.

== Reception ==
Michael Hogan wrote in The Daily Telegraph:

A counterpoint to Waldemar Januszczak's Ugly Beauty treatise last week, which insisted that beauty exists in contemporary art if you know where to look, Scruton's view is much more conservative. ... En route, Scruton namechecks many of the same modern artists as Januszczak: Carl Andre's bricks, the kitsch of Jeff Koons and the Young British Artist movement. His is a passionate argument, eloquently put, if perhaps a reactionary one.

Tim Dowling of The Guardian wrote:

[Scruton's] precis of the history of theories about beauty, from Plato to Kant, only served to soften his case. There's a reason people don't think of the world as "intrinsically meaningful" any more: because it isn't. ... Scruton's biggest problem was his failure to provide us with anything to replace the modern world with. To point us in the right direction for the future of architecture, he could only offer Poundbury, the Prince Charles-sponsored Anglo-Disney in Dorset. His visit with a traditionalist sculptor came across as two grumpy old men venting their contempt for all things new.
