= Violet (opera) =

2005 opera by Roger Scruton

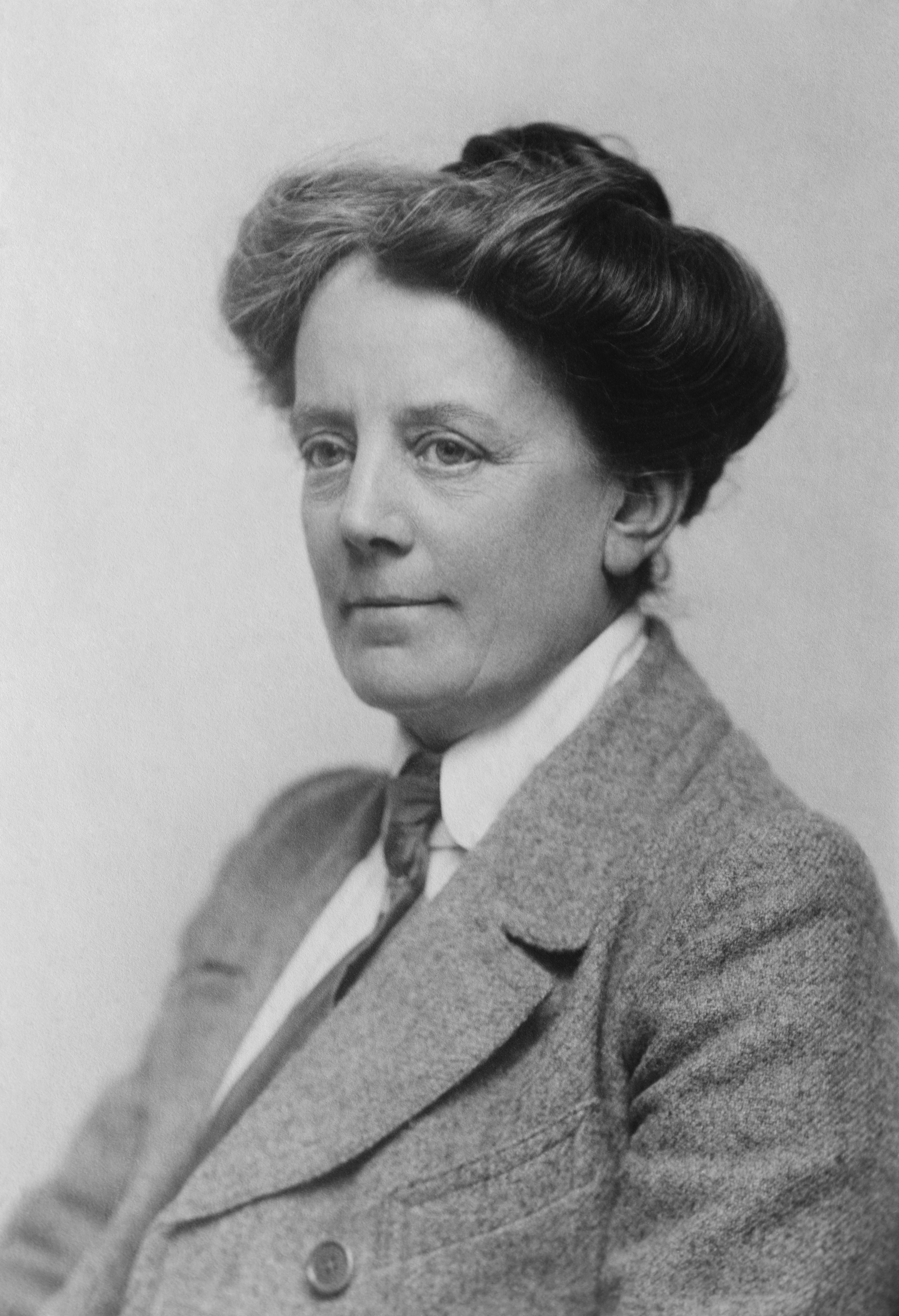
Ethel Smyth, who is played in the opera by a baritone

Violet is a 2005 opera by Roger Scruton about Violet Gordon-Woodhouse, a British keyboard player. It is the second of Scruton's two operas. He wrote words and music.

Scruton said that the opera "tells the remarkable story of this woman who lived with four men – it was a story about the history of music, the history of England, about sex, and the difference between the old culture of sex and the new one, and how it all came together in the life of this peculiar woman". The two-act opera was given the first of two performances on 30 November 2005 at Guildhall School of Music and Drama in London, directed by Tess Gibbs and conducted by Clive Timms.

== Background ==
The opera is based on the life of the harpsichordist Violet Gordon-Woodhouse. Violet is described in Grove Music Online as follows: "A woman of wealth and social standing (somewhat imperilled by her irregular private life), she did not lead a very active public professional life, but made a considerable impression on the intellectual and artistic circles of the day". An important source for the libretto is the biography of Violet by her great-niece, Jessica Douglas-Home (Douglas-Home, Jessica, "Violet : The Life and Loves of Violet Gordon Woodhouse", 1997). Jessica appears as a character in the opera.

Scruton was largely self-taught as a composer, and is better known as a philosopher and writer. Violet is the second of Scruton's two operas – it was preceded by the one-act The Minister (1998). According to The Times' critic Hilary Finch, Scruton's first opera was influenced by Benjamin Britten, whereas according to a review by David Conway, Violet is influenced by Leoš Janáček, a composer whom Scruton was known to admire. The score includes a number of references to music of other composers (including Bach, Mozart and Wagner), as well as to folksong.

The composer wrote "In Violet’s world high culture, eccentric life-style, and aristocratic manners achieved a never-to-be-repeated synthesis. And when that world was swept away by the First World War, a part of the English soul was lost". According to the programme note of the premiere performance, Violet epitomises "the sad magnificence of human folly".

Although some writers have called Violet’s domestic arrangements a "ménage à cinq", the phrase oversimplifies a household that was not polyamorous but rather a deliberately fashioned circle of affection, loyalty, and artistic fellowship. The cast of the opera includes Violet, her husband Gordon (with whom she had a mariage blanc) and a circle of relatives and friends including the lesbian composer Ethel Smyth (whose role is sung by a baritone) and three of Violet's male admirers.

== Roles ==
Role	Voice type	Premiere cast, 30 November 2005 (Conductor: Clive Timms)
Violet Gordon-Woodhouse	soprano	Joana Seara
Gordon Woodhouse, her husband		
Jessica Douglas-Home, her great-niece	soprano	Lenia Safiropoulou
Ethel Smyth	baritone	Tom Oldham (acting), Edmund Connolly (singing)
Max Labouchere		
William "Bill" Barrington	baritone	David Stout
Dennis Tollemache		

== Synopsis ==
The opera is set in the Gloucestershire home of the Woodhouses, Nether Lypiatt Manor. Jessica (in the present day), reading her great-aunt's papers, recreates the Edwardian world of Violet and her 'husbands' – Gordon, Max Labouchere, Bill Barrington (later 10th Viscount Barrington), Dennis Tollemache and Ethel. In real life, the ménage appears not to have been sexless, but according to the composer/librettist, Violet had a dream in which "love means purity and passion stops at the garden gate".

The characters extol Violet and dine together. In the second act we learn that Max has died in the trenches in World War I. Jessica, mourning what she sees as the loss of an innocent world, decides to sell the house.
