= Gentle Regrets =

2005 book by Roger Scruton

- Author: Roger Scruton
- Language: English
- Publisher: Continuum
- Publication date: 2005
- Publication place: United Kingdom
- Pages: 248
- ISBN: 9780826480330

Gentle Regrets: Thoughts from a Life is a 2005 memoir by the English philosopher Roger Scruton. It contains vignettes from his life and focuses on his intellectual influences and developments.
