= Francesca (novel) =

1991 novel by Roger Scruton

- Author: Roger Scruton
- Language: English
- Publisher: Sinclair-Stevenson
- Publication date: 1991
- Publication place: United Kingdom
- Pages: 235
- ISBN: 185619048X

Francesca is a 1991 novel by the English writer Roger Scruton. It was Scruton's second novel and originally published by Sinclair-Stevenson.

== Plot ==
The story follows Colin Ferguson, an English boy who goes to a grammar school in the early 1960s and dreams of becoming a writer. It portrays a series of characters, including Colin's socialist schoolmaster father and Francesca, the beautiful daughter of a lord, with whom Colin becomes infatuated. Colin has experiences with people from different social strata and undergoes a personal development.

== Reception ==
John Sutherland of the London Review of Books called Francesca an improvement from Scruton's 1981 debut novel Fortnight's Anger. He wrote that it is hard to figure out Scruton's intention with the story due to its "edgy enigmatic style", which Sutherland wrote may be the result of a failure to achieve the tone Scruton aimed for. Sutherland wrote that Francesca recalls Great Expectations and "leaves the reader stimulated, mildly infuriated, and seriously baffled". In a 2020 article in the International Journal of Philosophy and Theology, James Bryson tied the novel to a theme of aesthetic impulse and moral maturity that exists throughout Scruton's output, calling it an "overlooked but existentially powerful bildungsroman".
