= Michael Tanner =

British philosopher and opera critic (1935–2024)

Michael Keith Tanner (15 April 1935 – 3 April 2024) was a British philosopher and opera critic.

== Biography ==
Tanner was born in Bromley; his father was a London firefighter, but moved to Warwickshire before the outbreak of the Second World War. Tanner was educated at Warwick School. He completed National Service in the RAF, and then began to study at Corpus Christi, Cambridge in 1955. He was made a fellow of the college and an assistant lecturer in Moral Sciences in 1961; he became a lecturer in 1965, holding the post until his 2002 retirement, when he was made life fellow. Over his career, he authored books on Friedrich Nietzsche, Arthur Schopenhauer, and Richard Wagner, and edited Shaun Whiteside's translations of works by Nietzsche and Wilhelm Furtwängler.

Though employed as a philosopher, his passion was classical music, especially Wagner. He wrote a weekly opera column in The Spectator from 1996 to 2014, and continued to write for the publication until 2022.

The 2003 Routledge collection Art and Morality, edited by Jose Bermudez and Sebastian Gardner, was published in honour of Tanner.

Tanner died on 3 April 2024, at the age of 88. He was survived by his partner Michael Amos, with whom he lived in Cambridge.

== Selected bibliography ==
Author

- Tanner, Michael (1994). Nietzsche. Oxford: Oxford University Press.
- Tanner, Michael (1996). Wagner. New York: HarperCollins.
- Tanner, Michael (1999). Schopenhauer. Abingdon: Routledge.
- Tanner, Michael (2000). Nietzsche: A Very Short Introduction. Oxford: Oxford University Press.
- Tanner, Michael (2010). The Faber Pocket Guide to Wagner. London: Faber and Faber.

Editor

- Furtwängler, Wilhelm (1989). Notebooks, 1924-54, translated by Shaun Whiteside, edited by Michael Tanner. London: Quartet Books.
- Nietzsche, Friedrich (1993). The Birth of Tragedy Out of the Spirit of Music, translated by Shaun Whiteside, edited by Michael Tanner. London: Penguin.
