= How to Be a Conservative =

2014 book by Roger Scruton

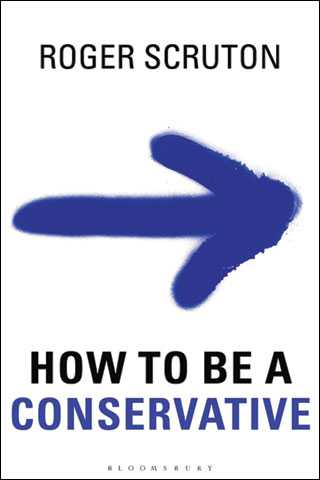
- Cover of the first edition
- Author: Roger Scruton
- Language: English
- Subject: Conservatism
- Published: 2014
- Publisher: Bloomsbury Continuum
- Publication place: United Kingdom
- Media type: Print
- ISBN: 978-1-4729-0376-1

How to Be a Conservative is a 2014 book by the English philosopher Roger Scruton, in which the author outlines the conservative ideology, its opposition to economic materialism, and argues how it can be applied to crucial contemporary issues.

== Reception ==
Jesse Norman wrote in The Spectator: "There are occasional missteps and the odd mini-rant, but the book is highly engaging, and studded with insights into topics as diverse as international treaties, alienation and the nature of laughter." In Standpoint, David Willetts wrote that the book "communicates a distinctive conservative disposition with great charm and formidable learning." Willetts wrote that Scruton:

is very good on the importance of autonomous institutions — what I called civic conservatism. But he is surprisingly uninterested in where this great tradition comes from or how it has changed over time. He appears to regard it as a happy and perhaps rather accidental gift from history. This means that his account of the role of Conservatives is rather passive and incurious.

== Translations ==
A Swedish translation was published in 2016. The book has also been translated into Czech by Jana Ogrocká, into Latvian by Krišjānis Lācis and into Hebrew by Yair Levinshtein with an introduction by the former prime-minister and writer Yair Lapid. The Czech translation was published in 2021.
