= George Henry Radcliffe Parkinson =

Philosopher and historian of philosophy

George Henry Radcliffe Parkinson (also known as Harry Parkinson; 2 November 1923 – 20 March 2015) was a British philosopher and historian of philosophy.

== Biography ==
Parkinson was born in 1923 in Tianjin, China, to British parents. He was educated at Bradford Grammar School and Wadham College, Oxford, where he obtained a First Class Honours degree in Literae Humaniores in 1949, and the degree of Doctor of Philosophy in 1952. His doctoral thesis concerned Baruch (Benedictus de) Spinoza. Later work focused on Gottfried W. (von) Leibniz. In 1950 he was appointed Assistant Lecturer in Philosophy at the University of Reading, under then Head of Department Professor H A Hodges, and he remained in the department until he retired. He was made a Professor there in 1974, served as Head of Department from 1983 to 1989, and was made an Emeritus Professor of Philosophy upon his retirement.

Best known for his work on the history of philosophy, perhaps particularly for his work on Leibniz, Parkinson was closely associated with the journal Studia Leibnitiana from its inception in 1969, and became one of its editors in 1988.

== Works ==
- Spinoza's Theory of Knowledge (Oxford University Press, 1954)
- Logic and Reality in Leibniz's Metaphysics (Oxford University Press, 1965)
- Leibniz on Human Freedom (Steiner, 1970)
- Georg Lukacs: The Man, his Work, and his Ideas (Routledge, 1977)
- The Theory of Meaning (Oxford University Press, 1968),
- Marx and Marxisms (Cambridge University Press, 1982)
- An Encyclopaedia of Philosophy (Routledge, 1988) (This is the British edition of The Handbook of Western Philosophy)
- G. W. von Leibniz's Logical Papers (Oxford University Press, 1966)
- G. W. von Leibniz's Philosophical Writings (J.M.Dent & Sons, 1973)
- Why the Humanities?: Essays on Some Aspects of University Education (University of Reading, 1987)
- The Handbook of Western Philosophy (Macmillan, 1988)
- G. W. von Leibniz's De Summa Rerum: Metaphysical Papers, 1675–1676 (Yale University Press, 1992)
- B. Spinoza's Ethics (Oxford University Press, 2000)
