= The Disappeared (novel) =

2015 novel by Roger Scruton

- Cover of the first edition
- Author: Roger Scruton
- Language: English
- Genre: Novel
- Publisher: Bloomsbury Reader
- Publication date: 5 March 2015
- Publication place: United Kingdom
- Media type: Print (paperback)
- Pages: 292
- ISBN: 9781448215218

The Disappeared is a 2015 novel by the English writer Roger Scruton. It tells the story of a schoolgirl from Northern England who has become the victim of an immigrant child grooming gang. Through clues in her essay on William Shakespeare's The Tempest, one of her teachers learns about the situation and tries to find a way to help her.

The title refers to victims of human trafficking as well as what Scruton describes as "the disappearance from our society of the old ideas of authority, the old religion, the old sense of belonging". Scruton based the novel on his experiences from the Ray Honeyford affair in 1984, which he combined with details from the case of the Oxford sex gang.

== Reception ==
Julie Bindel reviewed the book for Standpoint and called it "timely" and "brave". Bindel wrote that Scruton "will no doubt be accused of Islamophobia and racism by those that can only hear about multiculturalism as a force for good." Bindel wrote that the novel was not without faults: "I regularly had to check back to when a person was first introduced, to remind myself of their place in the scheme of things. The narrative is at times confusing or just too complex. But the author describes the clash of cultures, in this case of mainly Afghan migrants living in Britain, rather brilliantly. ... All his characters are flawed and complex, but Scruton attaches equal significance to his Muslim and non-Muslim characters; none is simply good or bad."
