= Conservatism: An Invitation to the Great Tradition =

2017 book by Roger Scruton

- Author: Roger Scruton
- Language: English
- Subject: Conservatism
- Publisher: All Points Books
- Publication date: 2017
- Publication place: United Kingdom
- Media type: Print
- Pages: 176
- ISBN: 978-1-250-17056-9
- Text: Conservatism: An Invitation to the Great Tradition at Internet Archive

Conservatism: An Invitation to the Great Tradition is a 2017 book by English philosopher Roger Scruton, in which the author outlines the development of modern conservatism. It is intended as an introduction to conservatism, with the author stating, "I have written this book in the hope of encouraging well-meaning liberals to take a look at what [the] arguments [for conservatism] really are”.

== Summary ==
Scruton traces the intellectual development of modern Western conservatism. He contends that modern conservatism "began as a defense of tradition against the calls for popular sovereignty; it became an appeal on behalf of religion and high culture against the materialist doctrine of progress, before joining forces with the classical liberals in the fight against socialism. In its most recent attempt to define itself it has become the champion of Western civilisation against its enemies".

Throughout, Scruton places emphasis on the tension between individual ambition and social membership—the "freedom of the individual” and the "need for custom and community”. Scruton criticizes both the individualism of Western progressivism and the collectivism of socialism, arguing conservatism finds a realistic middle ground that suits both the limits and aspirations of individuals by recognizing that "the individual first sets out on the journey to freedom" from the "spheres of attachment" of family and community.

=== Birth of modern conservatism ===
Scruton argues that whereas the conservatism of "pre-history" (pre-Enlightenment) focused on the preservation of old systems of power in which political authority flows down from the sovereign to individuals, modern conservatism is stolidly "a product of the Enlightenment" that accepts the (originally progressive) notion of popular sovereignty. Modern conservatism began as a "hesitation within liberalism", arising from the ideas of the classical liberals—notably Thomas Hobbes, James Harrington, John Locke, and Baron de Montesquieu—while insisting that the "liberation of the individual" advocated by liberalism "could not be achieved without the maintenance of customs and institutions". In particular, both "conservatives and liberals agree on the need for limited government, representative institutions, the separation of powers, and the basic rights of the citizen", but conservatives reject social contract theory and individualism not grounded by custom and tradition.

Scruton places particular emphasis on the conservative belief that liberty is not possible without custom and tradition, as "individual liberty [issues] from political order", and not the other way around. Because people are, according to Scruton, born into society "burdened by obligations and subject to institutions and traditions", he contends that liberty is inherited rather than chosen. He pillories liberals for focusing on "abstract ideas...designed to apply to all people everywhere" rather than "focus on the concrete inheritance of a people"—a tendency he argues led to the devastation of the French Revolution, which "systematically destroyed the stock of social capital" and descended into tyranny, and whose counter-tendency for continuity and respect of the law was the reason for the success of the American Revolution, whose constitution was "no more than a document making explicit a spirit already present in the Anglo-American common law".

=== Cultural conservatism ===
Scruton contends that the advent of the Industrial Revolution resulted in a shift in focus for conservatives, from "the battleground of politics" to the preservation of cultural values in the face of rapid social change. In particular, conservatives worried that industrial capitalism was destroying social cohesion and transforming culture.

=== Socialism ===
Alexis de Tocqueville, notes Scruton, believed that "the major problem facing modern society...is that of reconciling equality with liberty". The liberal tendency, Scruton alleges, emphasizes equality, and ultimately birthed socialism. In response, conservatives positioned themselves as champions of liberty first, and following World War I conservatives galvanized in opposition to the rise of socialism. In America, in particular, the Cold War cemented anti-communism as a part of conservatives' "self-definition". Notable voices in opposition to communism included Friedrich Hayek, who in The Road to Serfdom warned of the "danger of tyranny that inevitably results from government control of economic decision-making through central planning"; Ayn Rand, who believed "socialist policies...prevent the best and most useful people from exercising their skills and talents"; and James Burnham, who in The Managerial Revolution argued that the "tendency of socialism is not to produce a classless society...but on the contrary to generate a new and intransigent ruling class of bureaucrats—the managerial elite".

=== Contemporary conservatism ===
With the decline of socialism, Scruton argues conservatism again evolved. Contemporary conservatism, he believes, focuses on the championing of Western civilization and defending "national identity and traditional attachments against the emerging orthodoxy of 'multiculturalism'". This manifests in defending "culture and institutions in the face of the challenge presented by mass migration", as well as protecting Western civilization from two "enemies": political correctness and Islamic extremism. Fighting these "enemies" in a "culture war" has become a core component of the modern conservative identity, Scruton argues.

Other areas of focus in recent years have been opposition to judges who "read into" the US Constitution "rights and freedoms that appeal to modern liberals...but not to conservatives", including a right to abortion and a right to same-sex marriage, and defending the approach of using "market solutions" for social and political problems, rather than direct government intervention.

== Reception ==
The book has received mixed reviews.

Richard Aldous in The Wall Street Journal praised it, calling it "one of the most eloquent and even moving evocations of the conservative tradition in Western politics, philosophy and culture I have ever read…the ideal primer for those who are new to conservative ideas”. Steven Kessler in The European Conservative similarly reviewed the book favorably, stating:

"This book is an ideal primer to the intellectual conservatism. Scruton gracefully articulates conservatism’s main tenets, its historical foundations, and its value to our lives today. His eloquent yet accessible prose make this a perfect introduction to those interested in better understanding the liberal/conservative debate of today."

Michael S. Roth in The New York Times offered a lukewarm review, stating that while "readers will find Scruton’s deft handling of a variety of conservative thinkers enlightening", they will "be appalled at the grand old tradition of scapegoating he employs to rally the troops". He places particular criticism on Scruton's "scapegoating" of Muslims, stating:

"At the end of the book he turns against Muslims, hoping for a “rediscovery of ourselves” by stoking fear and loathing against those who he says do not share “our” religious or political inheritance. He knows how this will sound to many of his readers, so he warns them against thinking he’s just being racist. But one doesn’t have to be politically correct or to participate in what Scruton calls the “culture of repudiation” to find it unfortunate that a philosopher should stoop so low. The “great tradition” Scruton describes can attract study and respect without stimulating nasty chauvinism."

Joseph Hogan in The Nation struck a negative tone, calling the book "anachronistic and hopelessly obscure"—asserting that when Scruton "could apply his airy defenses of 'tradition' and 'custom' to today’s most urgent problems...he is either blandly silent or quaintly anachronistic. And when he manages to gesture toward issues of present importance—immigration and nationalism—he attempts, euphemistically, to dignify nativism and xenophobia". Hogan took aim at Scruton's claim that the book is intended to attract liberals, concluding the review by saying:

"What is most impressive about Conservatism is, in the end, its aloofness. It is difficult even to imagine young conservatives seeing themselves in the book. Easier to imagine, however, is the likely reaction of liberal readers, especially those who once yearned for a “philosophical” conservatism of custom and tradition. Scruton’s vision of conservatism is so unrelated to the current project of the right that it couldn’t produce in its liberal readers anything like nostalgia for a “Burkean” conservatism—but rather the felt sense that such a conservatism could never have existed."
