= Roger Scruton =

English philosopher (1944–2020)

Sir Roger Scruton FBA FRSL
- Scruton in 2016
- Born: Roger Vernon Scruton; 27 February 1944; Buslingthorpe, Lincolnshire, England
- Died: 12 January 2020 (aged 75); South Kensington, London, England
- Occupations: Philosopher; writer
- Television: Why Beauty Matters (BBC Two, 2009)
- Spouses: Danielle Laffitte (m. 1973; div. 1979) Sophie Jeffreys (m. 1996)
- Children: 2
- Awards: Medal of Merit (First Class) of the Czech Republic (1998); Knight Bachelor (United Kingdom, 2016); Grand Cross of the Order of Merit of the Republic of Poland (2019); Commander's Cross with Star of the Hungarian Order of Merit (2019)

Education
- Education: Jesus College, Cambridge (BA, MA, PhD)
- Doctoral advisor: G. E. M. Anscombe; Michael Tanner

Philosophical work
- Era: Contemporary philosophy
- Region: Western philosophy
- School: Conservatism; analytic philosophy
- Institutions: University of Cambridge; Birkbeck, University of London; Boston University; Institute for the Psychological Sciences; University of Oxford; University of St Andrews; University of Buckingham
- Main interests: Aesthetics; philosophy of culture; political philosophy
- Notable works: The Meaning of Conservatism (1980); 'Sexual Desire (1986); The Aesthetics of Music (1997); How to Be a Conservative (2014)
- Notable ideas: Oikophobia, green conservatism
- Roger Scruton speaking From the BBC Radio 4 programme A Point of View, 11 August 2013

Sir Roger Vernon Scruton (/ˈskruːtən/; 27 February 1944 – 12 January 2020) was an English philosopher, writer, and social critic who specialised in aesthetics and political philosophy, particularly in the furtherance of conservative views. The founding-editor of The Salisbury Review, a conservative political journal, Scruton wrote over 50 books on architecture, art, philosophy, politics, religion, among other topics. Scruton was also Chairman of the Building Better, Building Beautiful Commission for the United Kingdom government from 2019 to 2020. His views on classical architecture and beauty are still promoted via his foundation, while his political stances remain influential.

Scruton's publications include The Meaning of Conservatism (1980), Sexual Desire (1986), The Aesthetics of Music (1997), and How to Be a Conservative (2014). He was a regular contributor to the popular media, including The Times, The Spectator, and the New Statesman. Scruton explained that he embraced conservatism after witnessing the May 1968 student protests in France. From 1971 to 1992 he was lecturer, reader, and then Professor of Aesthetics at Birkbeck College, London, after which he was Professor of Philosophy at Boston University until 1995.

From then on, Scruton worked as a freelance writer and scholar, though he later held several part-time or temporary academic positions, including in the United States. In the 1980s he helped establish underground academic networks in Soviet-controlled Eastern Europe, for which he was awarded the Czech Republic's Medal of Merit (First Class) by President Václav Havel in 1998. Scruton was knighted in the 2016 Birthday Honours for "services to philosophy, teaching and public education".

== Early life ==
=== Family background ===
Roger Vernon Scruton was born on 27 February 1944 in Buslingthorpe, Lincolnshire, to John "Jack" Scruton, a teacher from Manchester, and his wife, Beryl Claris Scruton (née Haynes), and was raised with his two sisters in High Wycombe and Marlow. The Scruton surname was acquired relatively recently. His paternal grandfather's birth certificate recorded his name as Matthew Lowe, after Matthew's mother, Margaret Lowe (Scruton's great-grandmother); the document made no mention of a father. However, Margaret Lowe decided, for reasons unknown, to raise her son as Matthew Scruton instead. Scruton wondered whether she was employed at the former Scruton Hall in Scruton, Yorkshire, and whether it was where her children were conceived.

Jack was raised in a back-to-back on Upper Cyrus Street, Ancoats, an inner-city area of Manchester, and won a scholarship to Manchester High School, a grammar school. Jack's father was a labourer, and a heavy drinker; he had forced Jack to leave school at the age of 14 and work as a labourer even though Jack was a bright student. After the end of World War I, Jack joined a teacher training school and became a school master. As a result, Jack became an avowed socialist, one who believed the Anglo-Saxon working class had liberated themselves from the Anglo-Norman aristocracy.

Jack banned the siblings from reading Beatrix Potter's books because she was bourgeois and "polluted the beauty of the countryside and their wild Saxon inheritance". Scruton told The Guardian his father hated the upper classes and adored the English countryside and trade unions, while his mother entertained "blue-rinsed friends" and was fond of romantic fiction. He described his mother as "cherishing an ideal of gentlemanly conduct and social distinction that ... [his] father set out with considerable relish to destroy".

=== Education ===
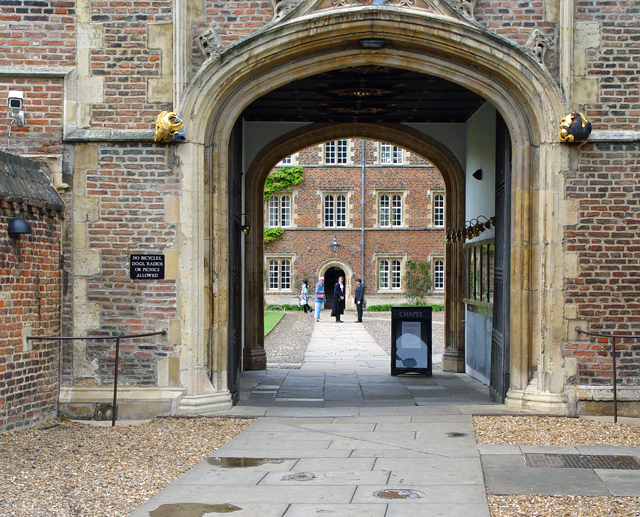
Scruton studied at Jesus College, Cambridge (1962–1965 and 1967–1969).

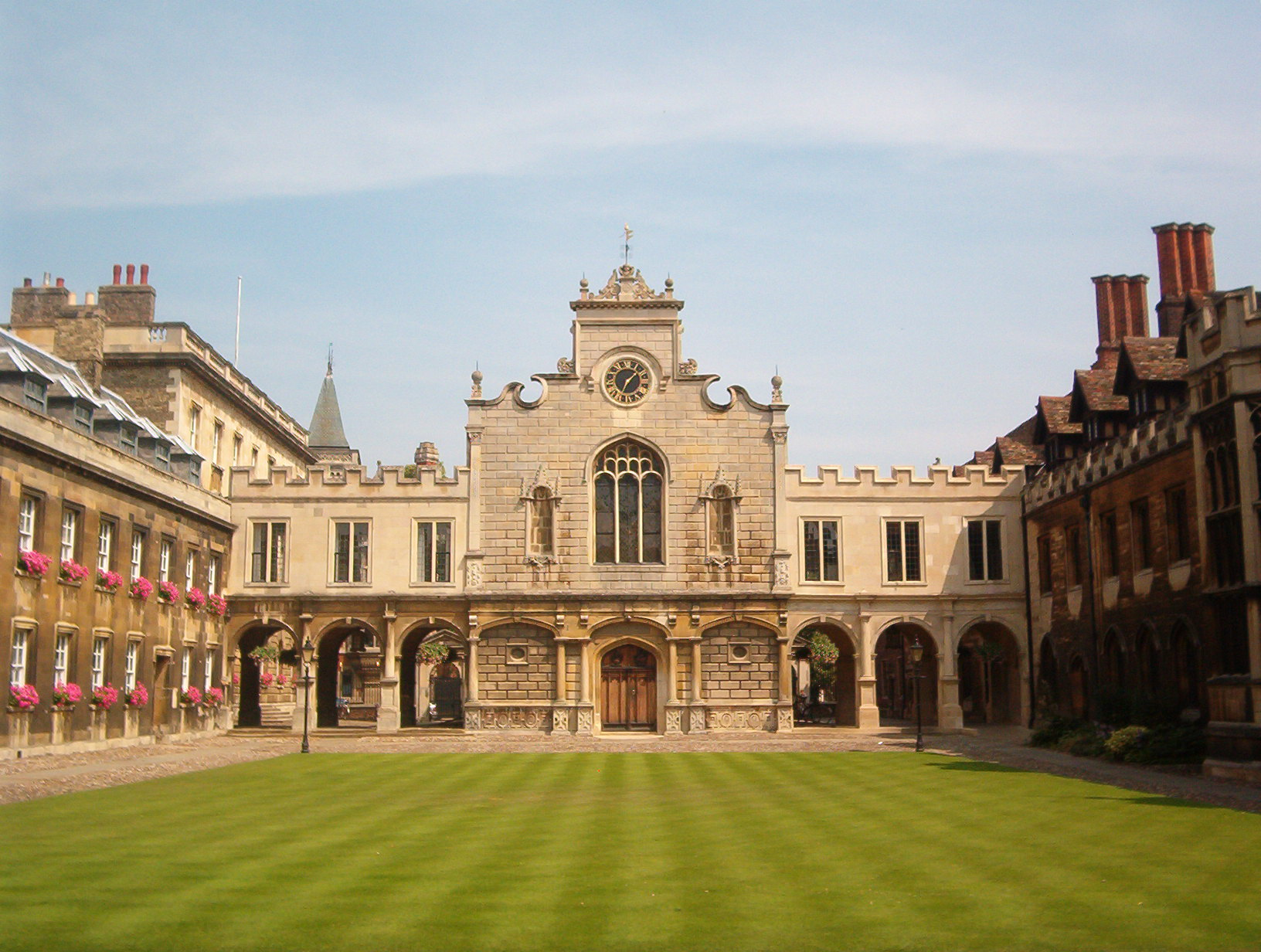
He was a research fellow at Peterhouse, Cambridge (1969–1971).

The Scrutons lived in a pebbledashed semi-detached house in Hammersley Lane, High Wycombe. Although his parents were brought up as Christians, they regarded themselves as humanists, so home was a "religion-free zone". Scruton and his whole family's relationship with his father was difficult. He wrote in Gentle Regrets (2005): "Friends come and go, hobbies and holidays dapple the soulscape like fleeting sunlight in a summer wind, and the hunger for affection is cut off at every point by the fear of judgement." Scruton inherited from his father a preference for local architecture, the necessity of home and settling down, and a dislike of change and modernism. As a teenager, Scruton was also influenced by Oswald Spengler's The Decline of the West series, particularly by its "resistance to enlightenment and belief in the necessity of culture and the fact of its decline".

After passing his 11-plus, he attended the Royal Grammar School High Wycombe from 1954 to 1962, leaving with three A-levels in pure and applied Mathematics, Physics, and Chemistry, which he passed with distinction. The results won him an open scholarship in Natural Sciences to Jesus College, Cambridge, as well as a state scholarship. When he told his family he had won a place at Cambridge, his father stopped speaking to him. When Scruton was caught riding on the London Underground without a ticket, he told the police his name was John Stuart Mill.

Scruton says he was expelled from the school shortly afterwards when, during one of Scruton's plays, the headmaster found the school stage on fire and a half-naked girl putting out the flames. During his gap year, Scruton initially washed dishes at a Lyons corner shop on Mile End Road, then hitchhiked through Greece and Egypt to Lebanon, where he witnessed the Lebanese Civil War and learned Arabic.

Having intended to study Natural Sciences at Cambridge, where he felt "although socially estranged (like virtually every grammar-school boy), spiritually at home", Scruton switched on the first day to Moral Sciences (Philosophy); his supervisor was A. C. Ewing. The college then had a rule prohibiting women from visiting a student's room; when his girlfriend's clothes were found by his tutor, Scruton escaped punishment by claiming he wore the clothes and was a transvestite. He graduated with a double first in 1965, then spent time overseas, some of it teaching at the University of Pau and Pays de l'Adour in Pau, France, where he met his first wife, Danielle Laffitte. He also lived in Rome. His mother died around this time; she was diagnosed with breast cancer and had undergone a mastectomy just before he went to Cambridge.

In 1967, he began studying for his doctorate at Jesus College and then became a research fellow at Peterhouse, Cambridge (1969–1971), where he lived with Laffitte when she was not in France. It was while visiting her during the May 1968 student protests in France when Scruton first embraced conservatism. He was in the Latin Quarter in Paris, watching students overturn cars, smash windows and tear up cobblestones, and for the first time in his life "felt a surge of political anger":

I suddenly realised I was on the other side. What I saw was an unruly mob of self-indulgent middle-class hooligans. When I asked my friends what they wanted, what were they trying to achieve, all I got back was this ludicrous Marxist gobbledegook. I was disgusted by it, and thought there must be a way back to the defence of western civilization against these things. That's when I became a conservative. I knew I wanted to conserve things rather than pull them down.

== 1970s–1980s ==
=== Birkbeck, first marriage ===
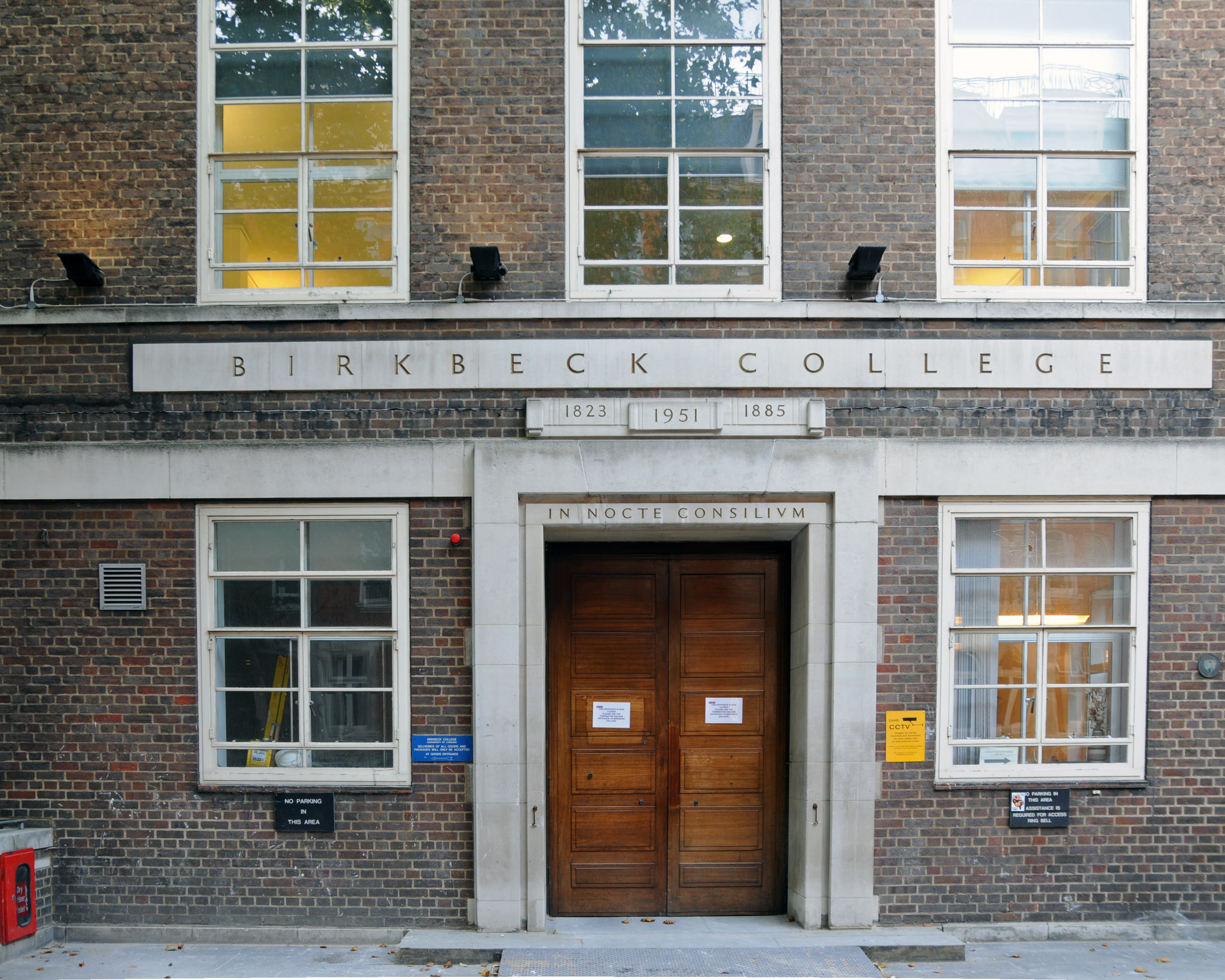
Scruton taught at Birkbeck College for 21 years.

Cambridge awarded Scruton his PhD degree in January 1973 for a thesis titled "Art and imagination, a study in the philosophy of mind", supervised by Elizabeth Anscombe and Michael Tanner. The thesis was the basis of his first book, Art and Imagination (1974). From 1971 he taught philosophy at Birkbeck College, London, which specializes in adult education and holds its classes in the evening. Meanwhile, Laffitte taught French at Putney High School, and the couple lived together in a Harley Street apartment previously occupied by Delia Smith. They married in September 1973 at the Brompton Oratory, a Catholic church in Knightsbridge, and divorced in 1979. Scruton's second book, The Aesthetics of Architecture, was published that year.

Scruton said he was the only conservative at Birkbeck, except for the woman who served meals in the Senior Common Room. Working there left Scruton's days free, so he used the time to study law at the Inns of Court School of Law (1974–1976) and was called to the Bar in 1978; he never practised because he was unable to take a year off work to complete a pupillage.

In 1974, along with Tory politicians Hugh Fraser and Jonathan Aitken and professor John Casey, he became a founding member of the Conservative Philosophy Group (CPG) dining club, which aimed to develop an intellectual basis for conservatism. Historian Hugh Thomas and philosopher Anthony Quinton attended meetings, as did Margaret Thatcher before she became prime minister. She reportedly said during one meeting in 1975: "The other side have got an ideology they can test their policies against. We must have one as well." Other notable people who attended CPG sessions include Syed Kamall, Enoch Powell, Friedrich Hayek, Milton Friedman and Michael Oakeshott. Scruton also invited the poet Michael Schmidt to join the CPG. Though Schmidt declined, he published Scruton's essays in his P. N. Review and Carcanet Press imprints, and also introduced Scruton to the writers C. H. Sisson and Donald Davie.

According to Scruton, his academic career at Birkbeck was blighted by his conservatism, particularly by his third book, The Meaning of Conservatism (1980), and later by his editorship of the conservative Salisbury Review. He told The Guardian his colleagues at Birkbeck vilified him over the book. The Marxist philosopher G. A. Cohen of University College London reportedly refused to teach a seminar with Scruton, although they later became friends. He continued teaching at Birkbeck until 1992, first as a lecturer, by 1980 as reader, then, having been awarded a chair in 1985, as Professor of Aesthetics.

=== The Salisbury Review ===
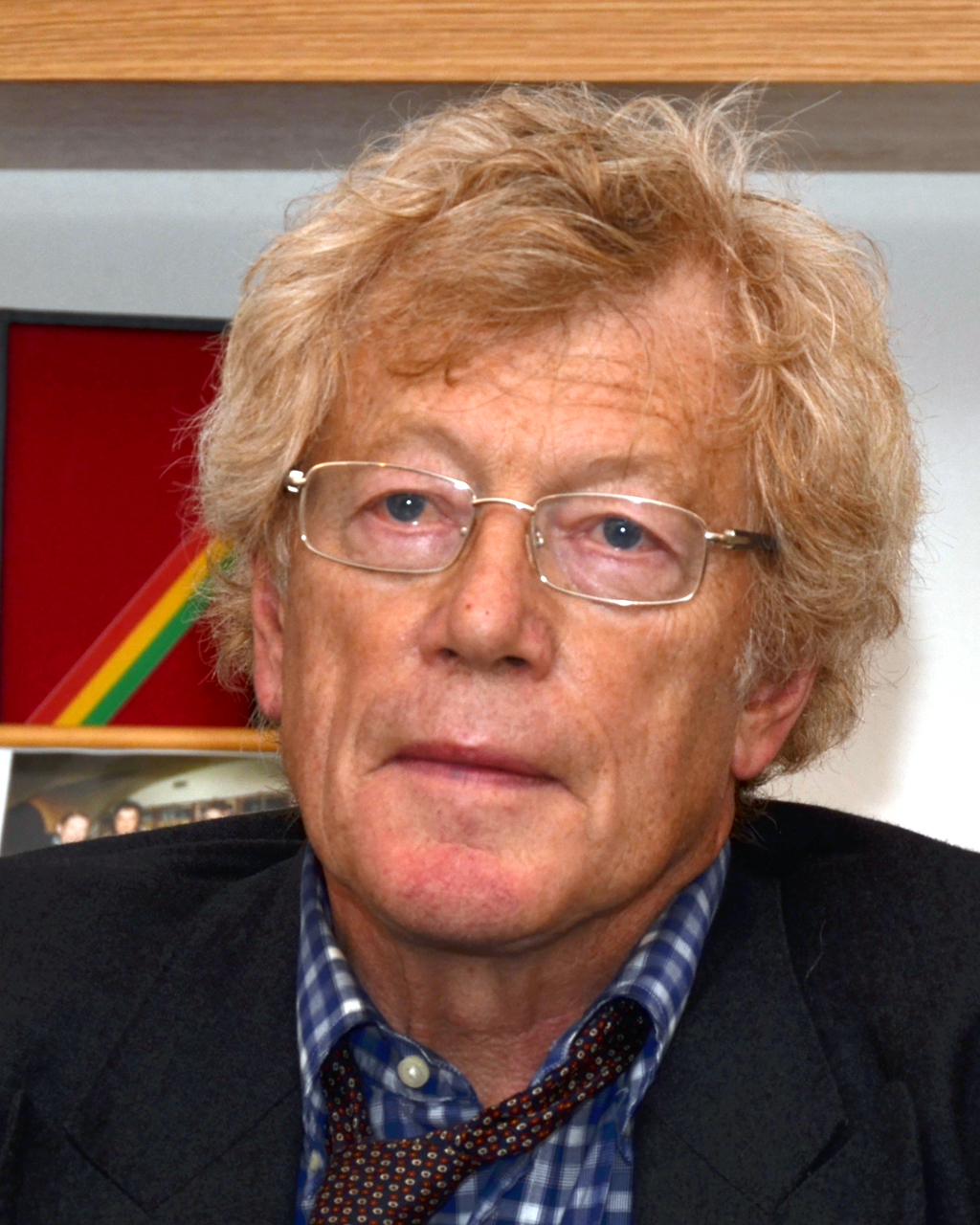
Scruton in Prague, 2015

In 1982 Scruton became founding editor of The Salisbury Review, a journal championing conservatism in opposition to Thatcherism, which he edited until 2001. The Review was set up by a group of Tories known as the Salisbury Group – founded in 1978 by Diana Spearman and Robert Gascoyne-Cecil – with the involvement of the Peterhouse Right. The latter were conservatives associated with the Cambridge college, including Maurice Cowling, David Watkin and mathematician Adrian Mathias. As of 1983 it had a circulation of under 1,000; according to Martin Walker, the circulation understated the journal's influence.

Scruton wrote that editing The Salisbury Review effectively ended his academic career in the United Kingdom. The magazine sought to provide an intellectual basis for conservatism, and was highly critical of key issues of the period, including the Campaign for Nuclear Disarmament, egalitarianism, feminism, foreign aid, multiculturalism and modernism. In the first edition, he wrote: "It is necessary to establish a conservative dominance in intellectual life, not because this is the quickest or most certain way to political influence, but because in the long run, it is the only way to create a climate of opinion favourable to the conservative cause." To begin with, Scruton had to write most of the articles himself, using pseudonyms: "I had to make it look as though there was something there in order that there should be something there!" He believes the Review "helped a new generation of conservative intellectuals to emerge. At last it was possible to be a conservative and also to the left of something, to say 'Of course, the Salisbury Review is beyond the pale; but ...'"

In 1984 the Review published a controversial article by Ray Honeyford, a headmaster in Bradford, questioning the benefits of multicultural education. Honeyford was forced to retire because of the article and had to live for a time under police protection. The British Association for the Advancement of Science accused the Review of scientific racism, and the University of Glasgow philosophy department boycotted a talk Scruton was invited to deliver to its philosophy society. Scruton believed the incidents made his position as a university professor untenable, although he also maintained "it was worth sacrificing your chances of becoming a Fellow of the British Academy, a vice-chancellor or an emeritus professor for the sheer relief of uttering the truth." (Scruton was in fact elected a Fellow of the British Academy in 2008.) In 2002 he described the effect of the editorship on his life:

It cost me many thousand hours of unpaid labour, a hideous character assassination in Private Eye, three lawsuits, two interrogations, one expulsion, the loss of a university career in Britain, unendingly contemptuous reviews, Tory suspicion, and the hatred of decent liberals everywhere. And it was worth it.

=== Writing ===
The 1980s established Scruton as a prolific writer. Thirteen of his non-fiction works appeared between 1980 and 1989, as did his first novel, Fortnight's Anger (1981). The most contentious publication was Thinkers of the New Left (1985), a collection of his essays from The Salisbury Review, which criticized 14 prominent intellectuals, including E. P. Thompson, Michel Foucault and Jean-Paul Sartre. (Note: The subjects of Thinkers of the New Left are E. P. Thompson, Ronald Dworkin, Michel Foucault, R. D. Laing, Raymond Williams, Rudolf Bahro, Antonio Gramsci, Louis Althusser, Immanuel Wallerstein, Jürgen Habermas, Perry Anderson, György Lukács, John Kenneth Galbraith and Jean-Paul Sartre.) According to The Guardian, the book was remaindered after being greeted with "derision and outrage". Scruton said he became very depressed by the criticism. In 1987 he founded his own publisher, The Claridge Press, which he sold to the Continuum International Publishing Group in 2002. (Note: "The Continuum International Publishing Group is delighted to announce the acquisition of the small, independent publishing house Claridge Press from its proprietor, the philosopher, Professor Roger Scruton.")

From 1983 to 1986 he wrote a weekly column for The Times. Topics included music, wine and motorbike repair, but others were contentious. The features editor, Peter Stothard, said there was no one he had ever commissioned "whose articles had provoked more rage". Scruton made fun of anti-racism and the peace movement, and his support for Margaret Thatcher while she was prime minister was regarded, he wrote, as an "act of betrayal for a university teacher". His first column, "Why politicians are all against real education", argued universities were destroying education "by making it relevant": "Replace pure by applied mathematics, logic by computer programming, architecture by engineering, history by sociology. The result will be a new generation of well-informed philistines, whose charmlessness will undo every advantage which their learning might otherwise have conferred."

=== Activism in Central Europe ===
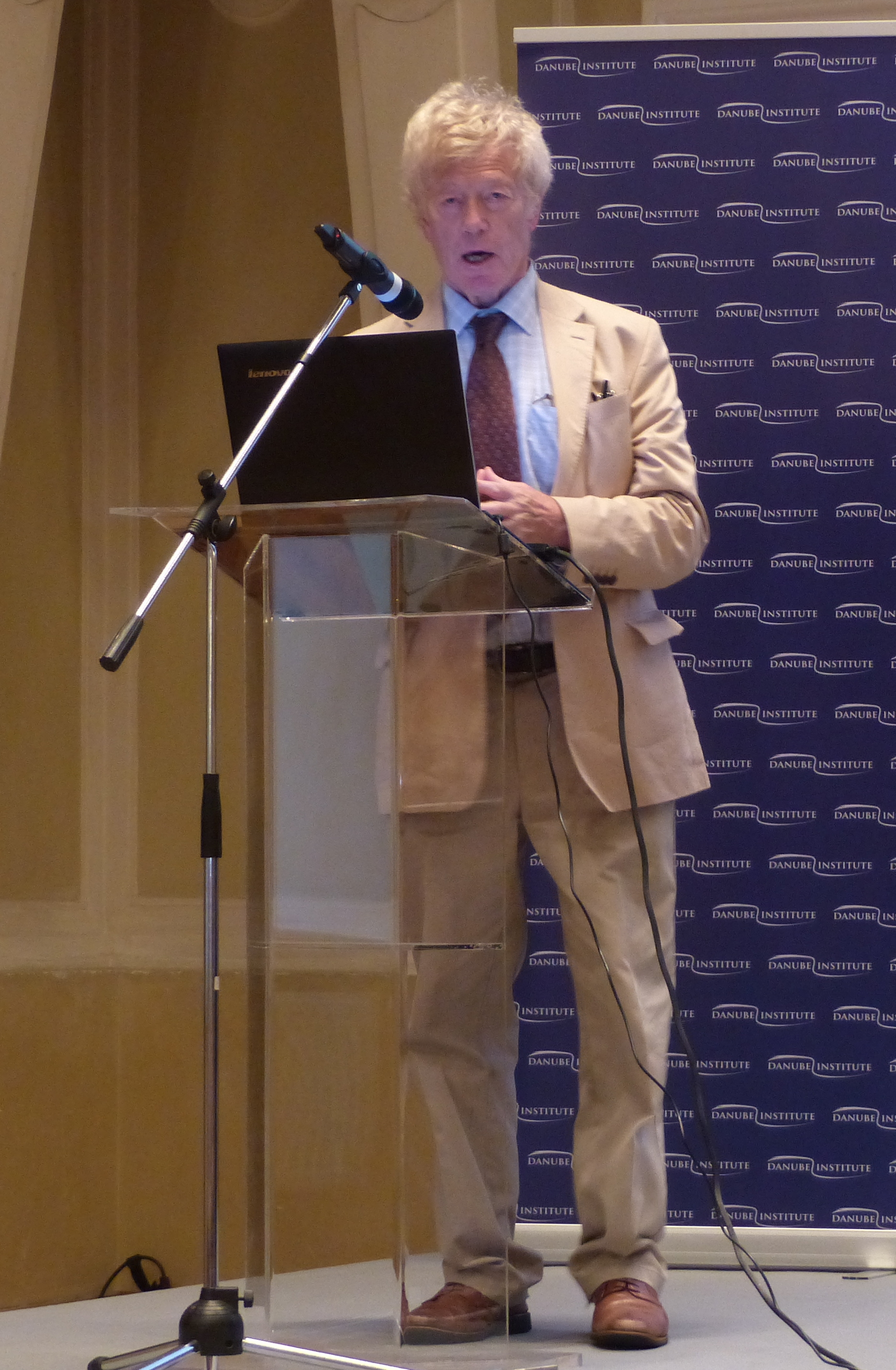
Scruton on "Europe and the Conservative Cause", Budapest, September 2016

In 1979, Scruton was invited by fellow professor Kathy Wilkes to a philosophy group which gathered secretly in Prague to avoid police attention. The first lecture he gave was on Wittgenstein's private language argument. From 1979 to 1989, Scruton was an active supporter of dissidents in Czechoslovakia under Communist Party rule, forging links between the country's dissident academics and their counterparts in Western universities. As part of the Jan Hus Educational Foundation, he and other academics visited Prague and Brno (both now located in the Czech Republic), in support of an underground education network started by Czech dissident Julius Tomin, smuggling in books, organizing lectures, and eventually arranging for students to study for a Cambridge external degree in theology (the only faculty which responded to the request for help). There were structured courses and samizdat translations, books were printed, and people sat exams in a cellar with papers smuggled out through the diplomatic bag. The effort was not supported by the British Foreign Office, except from 1983 to 1986, when Malcolm Rifkind was the Minister of State for Europe.

Scruton was detained in 1985 in Brno before being expelled from the country. Czech dissident Bronislava Müllerová watched him walk across the border with Austria: "There was this broad empty space between the two border posts, absolutely empty, not a single human being in sight except for one soldier, and across that broad empty space trudged an English philosopher, Roger Scruton, with his little bag into Austria." On 17 June that year, he was placed on the Index of Undesirable Persons. He wrote that he was also followed during visits to Poland and Hungary.

For his work in supporting dissidents, Scruton was awarded the First of June Prize in 1993 by the Czech city of Plzeň, and in 1998 he was awarded the Czech Republic's Medal of Merit (First Class) by President Václav Havel. In 2019 the Polish government awarded him the Grand Cross of the Order of Merit of the Republic of Poland. Scruton was strongly critical of figures in the West – in particular Eric Hobsbawm – who "chose to exonerate" the crimes and atrocities of former communist regimes. His experience of dissident intellectual life in 1980s Communist Prague is recorded in fictional form in his novel Notes from Underground (2014). He wrote in 2019 that "despite the appeal of the Poles, Hungarians, Romanians and many more, it is the shy, cynical Czechs to whom I lost my heart and from whom I have never retrieved it".

== 1990s–2000s ==
=== Farm purchase, second marriage ===
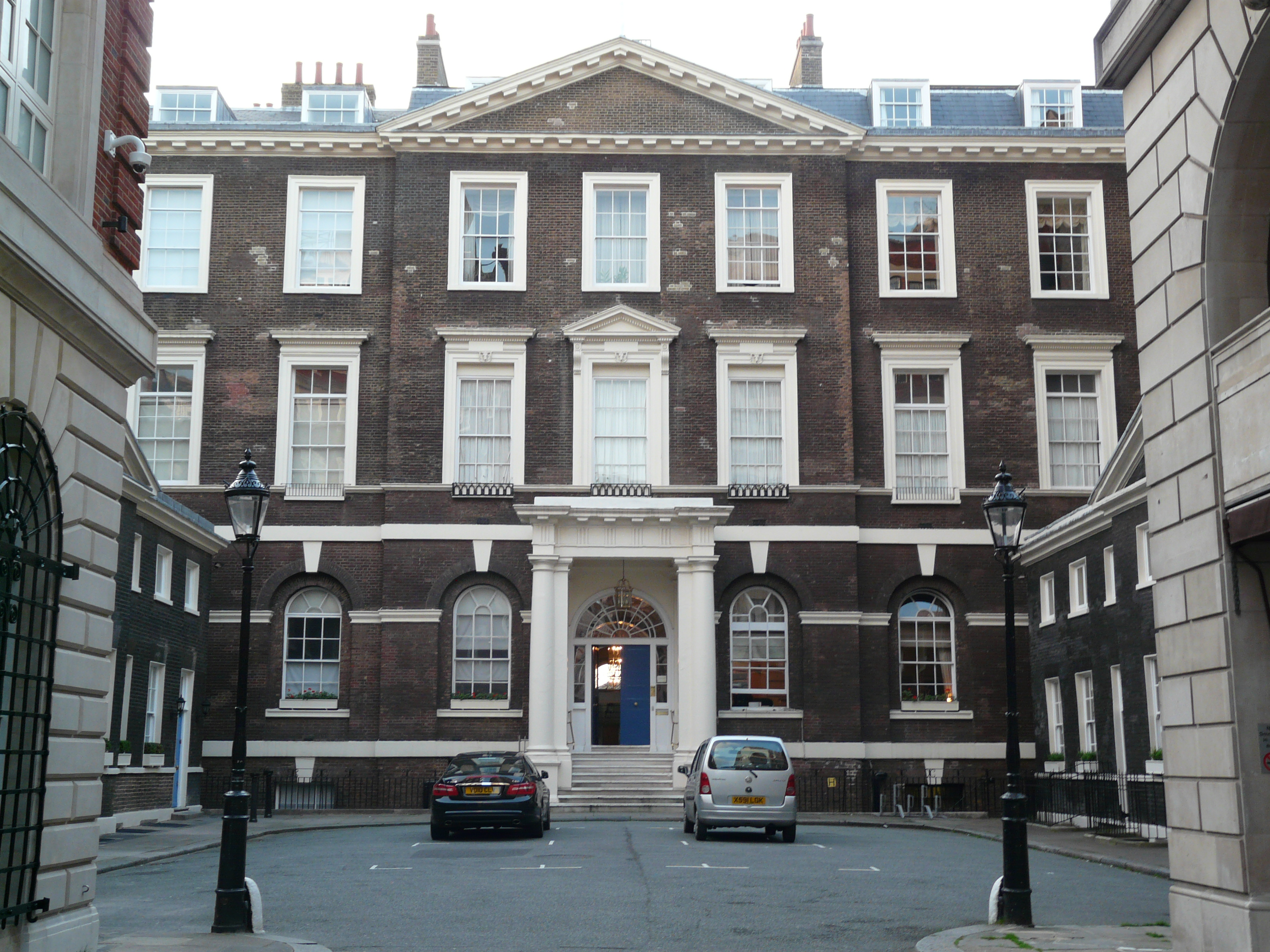
Scruton rented an apartment in Albany; the rooms had previously been Alan Clark's servants' quarters.

Scruton took a year's sabbatical from Birkbeck in 1990 and spent it working in Brno in the Czech Republic. That year he registered Central European Consulting, established to offer business advice in post-communist Central Europe. He sold his apartment in Notting Hill Gate, and when he returned to England, he rented a cottage in Stanton Fitzwarren, Swindon, from the Moonies, and an apartment in Albany on Piccadilly, London, from the Conservative MP Alan Clark (it had been Clark's servants' quarters).

From 1992 to 1995, he lived in Boston, Massachusetts, teaching an elementary philosophy course and a graduate course on the philosophy of music for one semester a year, as professor of philosophy at Boston University. Two of his books grew out of these courses: Modern Philosophy: A Survey (1994) and The Aesthetics of Music (1997). In 1993 he bought Sundey Hill Farm (Note: Also spelled "Sunday Hill Farm") in Brinkworth, Wiltshire—35 acres later increased to 100, and a 250-year-old farmhouse – where he lived after returning from the United States. He called it "Scrutopia".

While in Boston, Scruton had flown back to England every weekend to indulge his passion for fox hunting, and it was during a meet of the Beaufort Hunt when he met Sophie Jeffreys, an architectural historian. They announced their engagement in The Times in September 1996 (Jeffreys was described as the youngest daughter of the late Lord Jeffreys and of Annie-Lou Lady Jeffreys), married later that year and set up home on Sunday Hill Farm. Their two children were born in 1998 and 2000. In 1999 they created Horsell's Farm Enterprises, a PR firm that included Japan Tobacco International and Somerfield as clients. Scruton and his publisher were sued for libel that year by the Pet Shop Boys for suggesting, in his book An Intelligent Person's Guide to Modern Culture (1998), that their songs were in large part the work of sound engineers; the group settled for undisclosed damages.

=== Tobacco company funding ===
Scruton was criticized in 2002 for having written articles about smoking without disclosing that he was receiving a regular fee from Japan Tobacco International (JTI, formerly R. J. Reynolds). In 1999 he and his wife – as part of their consultancy work for Horsell's Farm Enterprises – began producing a quarterly briefing paper, The Risk of Freedom Briefing (1999–2007), about the state's control of risk. Distributed to journalists, the paper included discussions about drugs, alcohol and tobacco, and was sponsored by JTI. Scruton wrote several articles in defence of smoking around this time, including one in 1998 for The Times, three for the Wall Street Journal (two in 1998 and one in 2000), one for City Journal in 2001, and a 65-page pamphlet for the Institute of Economic Affairs, WHO, What, and Why: Trans-national Government, Legitimacy and the World Health Organisation (2000). The latter criticized the World Health Organization's campaign against smoking, arguing that transnational bodies should not seek to influence domestic legislation because they are not answerable to the electorate.

In 2002, The Guardian reported Scruton was writing about these issues while failing to disclose that he was receiving £54,000 a year from JTI. The payments came to light when a September 2001 email from the Scrutons to JTI was leaked to The Guardian. Signed by Scruton's wife, the email asked the company to increase their £4,500 monthly fee to £5,500, in exchange for which Scruton would "aim to place an article every two months" in the Wall Street Journal, Times, Telegraph, Spectator, Financial Times, Economist, Independent, or New Statesman. Scruton, who said the email was stolen, replied that he had never concealed his connection with JTI. In response to The Guardian article, the Financial Times ended his contract as a columnist, The Wall Street Journal suspended his contributions, and the Institute for Economic Affairs said it would introduce an author-declaration policy. Chatto & Windus withdrew from negotiations for a book, and Birkbeck removed his visiting-professor privileges.

=== Move to the United States ===
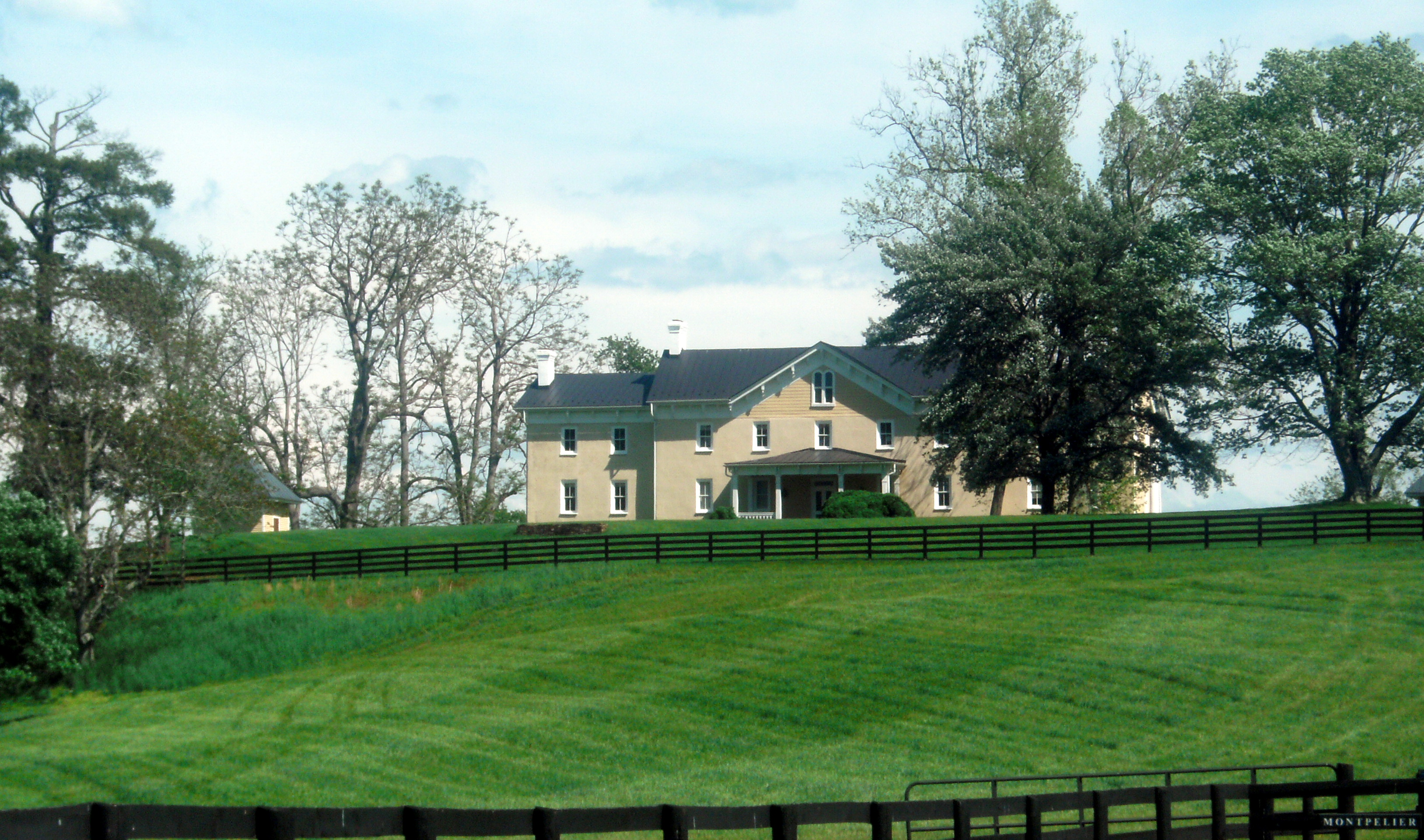
The Scrutons owned Montpelier, near Sperryville, Virginia, from 2004 to 2009.

The tobacco controversy damaged Scruton's consultancy business in England. In part because of that, and because the Hunting Act 2004 had banned fox hunting in England and Wales, the Scrutons considered moving to the United States permanently, and in 2004 they purchased Montpelier, an 18th-century plantation house near Sperryville, Virginia. Scruton set up a company, Montpelier Strategy LLC, to promote the house as a venue for weddings and similar events. The couple lived there while retaining Sunday Hill Farm in England, but decided in 2009 against a permanent move to the United States and sold the house. Scruton held two part-time academic positions during this period. From 2005 to 2009 he was research professor at the Institute for the Psychological Sciences in Arlington, Virginia, a graduate school of Divine Mercy University; and in 2009 he worked at the American Enterprise Institute in Washington, D.C., where he wrote his book Green Philosophy (2011).

=== Wine and opera ===
From 2001 to 2009 Scruton wrote a wine column for the New Statesman, and contributed to The World of Fine Wine and Questions of Taste: The Philosophy of Wine (2007), with his essay "The Philosophy of Wine". His book, I Drink Therefore I Am: A Philosopher's Guide to Wine (2009), is partly based on material from his New Statesman column. Scruton was initially a member of the Athenaeum Club, London, but later switched to the Travellers Club. There, his encounters with Alfred Newman Gilbey, who was also the chaplain at Cambridge during Scruton's studies, helped him consolidate his religious beliefs.

Scruton, who was largely self-taught as a composer, apart from some early guidance from his friend David Matthews, composed two operas setting his own libretti. The first is a one-act chamber piece, The Minister (1994), and the second a two-act opera, Violet (2005). The latter, based on the life of British harpsichordist Violet Gordon-Woodhouse, was performed twice at the Guildhall School of Music in London in 2005. Scruton also composed Three Lorca Songs, which were performed in the Netherlands by soprano Kristina Bitenc and pianist Jeroen Sarphati in 2009, and he wrote the libretto to Anna, a two-act opera by David Matthews which premiered at The Grange Festival on 14 July 2023.

== 2010s ==
=== Academic posts, knighthood ===
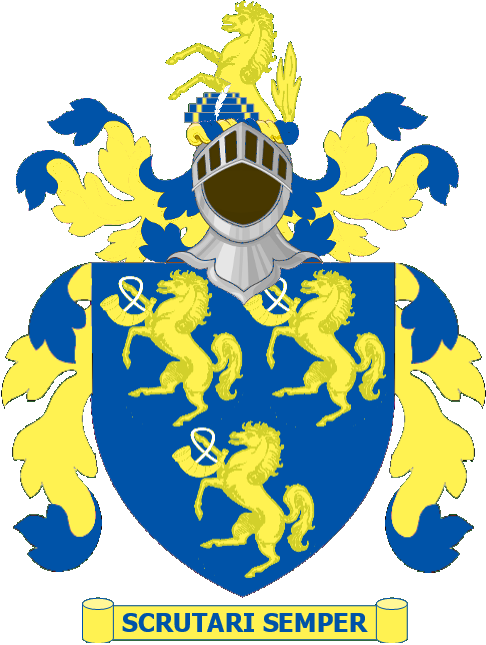
Coat of arms

The Scrutons returned from the United States to live at Sunday Hill Farm in Wiltshire, and Scruton took an unpaid research professorship at the University of Buckingham. At Buckingham, Scruton supervised Ed Husain's postdoctoral research and thesis; and introduced Husain to, among others, Syrian architect Marwa Al-Sabouni. Scruton and Paul Cliteur jointly supervised Thierry Baudet's postdoctorate at Leiden University. In January 2010 he began an unpaid three-year visiting professorship at the University of Oxford to teach graduate classes on aesthetics, and was made a senior research fellow of Blackfriars Hall, Oxford. In 2010 he delivered the Scottish Gifford Lectures at the University of St Andrews on "The Face of God", and from 2011 until 2014 he held a quarter-time professorial fellowship at St Andrews in moral philosophy.

Two novels appeared during this period: Notes from Underground (2014) was based on his experiences in Czechoslovakia, and The Disappeared (2015) dealt with child trafficking in a Yorkshire town. Scruton was knighted in the 2016 Birthday Honours for "services to philosophy, teaching and public education". He sat on the editorial board of the British Journal of Aesthetics, and on the board of visitors of Ralston College, a new college proposed in Savannah, Georgia, and was a senior fellow of the Ethics and Public Policy Center, a conservative think tank in Washington, D.C.

=== Building Better, Building Beautiful Commission ===
In November 2018, Communities Secretary James Brokenshire appointed Scruton as unpaid chair of the British government's Building Better, Building Beautiful Commission, established to promote better home design. Labour and Liberal Democrat MPs objected because of remarks Scruton had made years earlier: he had described Islamophobia as a "propaganda word", homosexuality as "not normal", lesbianism as "usually an attempt by a woman to find that committed love that she can't get from men any more", and date rape as not a crime. He had also made allegedly conspiratorial remarks about the Jewish businessman George Soros.

In April 2019, an interview of Scruton by George Eaton appeared in the New Statesman. To publicise it, Eaton posted edited extracts from the interview on Twitter, of Scruton talking about Soros, Chinese people and Islam, among other topics, referring to these as "a series of outrageous remarks". Immediately after the interview and Eaton's posts went online, Scruton began to be criticised by various politicians and journalists; hours later, Brokenshire dismissed Scruton from the commission. When Scruton's dismissal was announced, Eaton posted a photograph of himself on Instagram drinking from a bottle of champagne, captioned, "The feeling when you get right-wing racist and homophobe Roger Scruton sacked as a Tory government adviser". The next day, Scruton wrote in The Spectator, "We in Britain are entering a dangerous social condition in which the direct expression of opinions that conflict – or merely seem to conflict – with a narrow set of orthodoxies is instantly punished by a band of self-appointed vigilantes." On 12 April, Eaton apologised for his tweets and the Instagram post but otherwise stood by the interview, although he would not release a full recording.

On 25 April, Scruton's colleague Douglas Murray, who had obtained a full recording of the interview, published details of it in The Spectator, and said Eaton had conducted a "hit job". The audio suggested both the tweets and Eaton's article had omitted relevant context. For example, Scruton had said: "Anybody who doesn't think that there's a Soros empire in Hungary has not observed the facts", but the article omitted: "it's not necessarily an empire of Jews; that's such nonsense." Of the Chinese, Eaton tweeted that Scruton said: "Each Chinese person is a kind of replica of the next one and that is a very frightening thing." Eaton's article included more words: "They're creating robots out of their own people ... each Chinese person is a kind of replica ...." The transcript showed the full sentence: "In a sense they're creating robots out of their own people by so constraining what can be done," which suggested the topic was the Chinese Communist Party. In response, the New Statesman published the full transcript.

On 2 May, the New Statesman readers' editor, Peter Wilby, wrote that Eaton's online comments suggested he had "approached the interview as a political activist, not as a journalist". Two months later, the New Statesman officially apologised. Several days later, Brokenshire also apologised to Scruton. Scruton was re-appointed a week later as co-chair of the commission alongside Nicholas Boys Smith.

== Cultural views ==
=== Aesthetics ===
According to Paul Guyer, in A History of Modern Aesthetics: The Twentieth Century, "After Wollheim, the most significant British aesthetician has been Roger Scruton." Scruton was trained in analytic philosophy, although he was drawn to other traditions. "I remain struck by the thin and withered countenance that philosophy quickly assumes," he wrote in 2012, "when it wanders away from art and literature, and I cannot open a journal like Mind or The Philosophical Review without experiencing an immediate sinking of the heart, like opening a door into a morgue."

He specialised in aesthetics throughout his career. From 1971 to 1992 he taught aesthetics at Birkbeck College. His PhD thesis formed the basis of his first book, Art and Imagination (1974), in which he argued that "what demarcates aesthetic interest from other sorts is that it involves the appreciation of something for its own sake". He subsequently published The Aesthetics of Architecture (1979), The Aesthetic Understanding (1983), The Aesthetics of Music (1997), and Beauty (2010). In 2008 a two-day conference was held at Durham University to assess his impact in the field, and in 2012 a collection of essays, Scruton's Aesthetics, edited by Andy Hamilton and Nick Zangwill, was published by Palgrave Macmillan.

In an Intelligence Squared debate in March 2009, Scruton (seconding historian David Starkey) proposed the motion: "Britain has become indifferent to beauty", and held an image of Botticelli's The Birth of Venus next to one of supermodel Kate Moss. Later that year he wrote and presented a BBC Two documentary, Why Beauty Matters, where he argued beauty should be restored to its traditional position in art, architecture and music. He wrote that he received "more than 500 e-mails from viewers, all but one saying, 'Thank Heavens someone is saying what needs to be said.'" In 2018 he argued a belief in God makes for more beautiful architecture:

Who can doubt, on visiting Venice, that this abundant flower of aesthetic endeavour was rooted in faith and watered by penitential tears? Surely, if we want to build settlements today we should heed the lesson of Venice. We should begin always with an act of consecration, since we thereby put down the real roots of a community.

=== Philosophy of sex ===
The philosopher of religion Christopher Hamilton described Scruton's Sexual Desire (1986) as "the most interesting and insightful philosophical account of sexual desire" produced within analytic philosophy. The book influenced subsequent discussions of sexual ethics. Martha Nussbaum, who reviewed the work in 1986, credited Scruton in 1995 with having provided "the most interesting philosophical attempt as yet to work through the moral issues involved in our treatment of persons as sex partners".

According to Jonathan Dollimore, Scruton based a conservative sexual ethic on the Hegelian proposition that "the final end of every rational being is the building of the self", which involves recognizing the other as an end in itself. Scruton argues the major feature of perversion is "sexual release that avoids or abolishes the other", which he sees as narcissistic and solipsistic. Nussbaum countered that Scruton did not apply his principle of otherness equally – for example, to sexual relationships between adults and children or between Protestants and Catholics.

In an essay, "Sexual morality and the liberal consensus" (1990), Scruton wrote that homosexuality leads to the "de-sanctifying of the human body" because the body of the homosexual's lover belongs to the same category as his own. He further argued gay people can have no children and consequently have no interest in creating a socially stable future. He therefore considered it justified to "instil in our children feelings of revulsion" towards homosexuality, and in 2007 he challenged the idea that gay people should have the right to adopt. In 2010, Scruton told The Guardian he would no longer defend the view that revulsion against homosexuality could be justified.

=== Animal rights ===
In Animal Rights and Wrongs (2000), Scruton identifies three kinds of relationships of duty between humans and other animals: relationships with pets, who are given "honorary membership of the moral community"; with animals kept to be used in some way, "where we have a clear duty of care but we are not trying to establish quasi-personal relations"; and with wild animals. Scruton supported and grew to love hunting: "My life divides into three parts," he wrote in On Hunting (1998). "In the first I was wretched; in the second ill at ease; in the third hunting." For animals to have rights in the way humans have rights, he argues, they would also have to be "accorded not only the benefits of morality, but also the burdens, which are huge". Every legal privilege, he writes, imposes a burden on the one who does not possess that privilege: that is, "your right may be my duty." He accuses animal rights advocates of "pre-scientific" anthropomorphism, attributing traits to animals which are, he says, Beatrix Potter-like, where "only man is vile."

A deontologist, Scruton was critical of the consequentialist, utilitarian approach of Australian philosopher and animal-rights advocate Peter Singer. Scruton wrote that Singer's works, including Animal Liberation (1975), "contain little or no philosophical argument. They derive their radical moral conclusions from a vacuous utilitarianism that counts the pain and pleasure of all living things as equally significant and that ignores just about everything that has been said in our philosophical tradition about the real distinction between persons and animals."

=== Religion ===
Scruton speaking at Fronteiras do Pensamento in 2019

Scruton was an Anglican. His book Our Church: A Personal History of the Church of England (2013) defended the relevance of the Church of England. He contends, following Immanuel Kant, that human beings have a transcendental dimension, a sacred core exhibited in their capacity for self-reflection. He argued the world was in an era of secularization without precedent in history; writers and artists such as Rainer Maria Rilke, T. S. Eliot, Edward Hopper and Arnold Schoenberg "devoted much energy to recuperating the experience of the sacred – but as a private rather than a public form of consciousness." Because these thinkers directed their art at the few, he writes, it has never appealed to the many.

On the matter of evidence of God's existence, Scruton said: "Rational argument can get us just so far... It can help us to understand the real difference between a faith that commands us to forgive our enemies, and one that commands us to slaughter them. But the leap of faith itself – this placing of your life at God's service – is a leap over reason's edge. This does not make it irrational, any more than falling in love is irrational." But despite claiming belief alone is sufficiently rational, he advocated a form of the argument from beauty: he said when we take the beauty in the natural world around us as a gift, we are able to openly understand God. The beauty speaks to us, he claims, and from it we can understand God's presence around us.

=== Education ===
Scruton considered that moral education should be "endarkening" as well as "enlightening", with "endarkening" being used as the inverse of "enlightening". "Endarkenment" is Scruton's way of describing the process of socialisation through which certain behaviours and choices are closed off and forbidden to the subject, which he considers necessary to curb socially damaging impulses and behaviour:

moral education cannot be ... purely enlightened and enlightening ... it cannot be simply a matter of teaching [people] to calculate the long term profit and the loss, while leaving .. desires to develop independently. It must involve an endarkened and endarkening component, by which [people] are taught precisely to cease [their] calculations, to regard certain paths as forbidden, as places where neither profit nor loss has authority.

=== Oikophilia vs oikophobia ===
In his memorial to Scruton, the philosopher Roger Berkowitz writes "Perhaps the most interesting element of Scruton's brand of conservatism was his emphasis on the love of home, what he called oikophilia", a greek portmanteau synthesis of "oikos" and "philia", the former "means the household and names the order and guidance of a home" while the latter can be translated to the english "love". By contrast, oikophobia was defined by Scruton as "an educated derision that has been directed towards historical loyalties by our intellectual elites, who have tended to dismiss all ordinary forms of patriotism and local attachment as forms of racism, imperialism or xenophobia of which it accuses the world."

For Mark Dooley, Scruton was "a thinker in the mold of Edmund Burke, one for whom the defense of ancestral institutions was vital to the health of a nation. Scruton's politics emerge from his deeply held philosophical convictions about the human person and the repeated attempts by science and pseudo-science to undermine it." Philosophy was to Scruton "seamstress of the Lebenswelt", by which he meant "the lived human world".

Daniel Pitt writes of the Scrutonian idea of oikophilia that it reminds him of a line by G. K. Chesterton, "the way to love anything is to realize that it may be lost" and an argument made by Mitchell that "we must root politics and culture in gratitude". Pitt sees "Scruton's conservativism as an embodiment of that rootedness."

In his lengthy academic memorial tribute to Scruton for the British Academy, Anthony O'Hear writes that "It should be stressed that oikophilia does not imply xenophobia, a charge which can hardly be laid against Scruton himself, with his command of Turkish and Arabic, alongside most of the major European languages and his love of many other cultures. One can love one's home, without hating or fearing the foreigner. But oikophilia will make one cautious, as Scruton was, about globalisation and mass migration where these phenomena uproot old identities and forms of belonging."

Writing in The New Criterion, Daniel J. Mahoney finds that Scruton was "defender of the soul and civilization", and says that his oikophilia "was in truth a proposition for all mankind", while Tafford Williams wrote in The Reformed Conservative that "Oikophilia is the love of family, church, workplace, and community associations. The 'little platoons' which are, as Burke described, 'the first link in the series by which we proceed towards a love to our country, and to mankind.' Oikophilia, therefore, is an a posteriori approach to politics, preferring the communities man has historically fostered and deriving general principles from their history of operation," and found that this idea was in fact biblical in nature. Cambridge's journal Philosophy found it fitting to publish a work entitled "A home of one's own: The Philosophy in Roger Scruton's Literary Writings", in which oikophilia is described and celebrated. In 2022 Paul Maritz reminded readers that "In 1993, the English conservative author Sir Roger Scruton published a now famous paper, 'Oikophobia', in the Journal of Education", from whence he proposes to "assess whether it can be viewed as not only an acceptable, but more so a sufficient, aim of the modern conservative project".

Scruton's book How to Think Seriously About the Planet: The Case for an Environmental Conservatism, in which he features oikophilia as a centre-piece, was reviewed by Joe DesJardins in the January 2013 issue of Notre Dame Philosophical Reviews and in conclusion wrote "Scruton's oikophilia, and more importantly his traditional conservative philosophy, has much to offer to environmental thinking." Another book of Scruton's, Green Philosophy: How to Think Seriously About the Planet was reviewed in 2012 by Cambridge's journal Philosophy. This subject was positively treated in a 2023 essay for the magazine Hungarian Conservative, while Erin Doom writes in the Eighth Day Institute newsletter of April 2022 of the "Triumph of Oikomachia". Peter Augustine Lawler came out "Against oikophobia and xenophobia" in 2017; he should know for he authored an academic article on the subject in 2016. Mahoney wrote in January 2025 that care for the soul depended on oikophilia, while Leah Kostamo wrote as early as 2013 in the magazine Comment that "Oikophilia will save the world".

Perhaps the most thorough review to date of Scruton's entire oeuvre on oikophilia was written by Nowak for a Polish audience.

== Political views ==
=== Conservatism ===
Scruton was best known for his writing in support of conservatism, and his intellectual heroes were Edmund Burke, Samuel Taylor Coleridge, Fyodor Dostoevsky, Georg Wilhelm Friedrich Hegel, John Ruskin, and T. S. Eliot. His third book, The Meaning of Conservatism (1980) – which he called "a somewhat Hegelian defence of Tory values in the face of their betrayal by the free marketeers" – was responsible, he said, for blighting his academic career. He supported Margaret Thatcher, while remaining sceptical of her view of the market as a solution to everything, but after the Falklands War, he thought she "recognised that the self-identity of the country was at stake, and that its revival was a political task". Scruton was opposed to the over-reliance of Thatcherism on the free market, and advocated for authority and tradition. He believed freedom was emergent from and not the cause of a well-functioning society. He claimed Thatcher was unmoved by this strand of philosophy and was instead guided by Alan Walters and Alfred Sherman.

Scruton wrote in Gentle Regrets (2005) that he found several of Burke's arguments in Reflections on the Revolution in France (1790) persuasive. Although Burke was writing about revolution, not socialism, Scruton was persuaded that, as he put it, the utopian promises of socialism are accompanied by an abstract vision of the mind that bears little relation to the way most people think. Burke also convinced him that there is no direction to history, no moral or spiritual progress; that people think collectively toward a common goal only during crises such as war, and that trying to organize society this way requires a real or imagined enemy; hence, Scruton wrote, the strident tone of socialist literature.

Scruton further argued, following Burke, that society is held together by authority and the rule of law, in the sense of the right to obedience, not by the imagined rights of citizens. Obedience, he wrote, is "the prime virtue of political beings, the disposition that makes it possible to govern them, and without which societies crumble into 'the dust and powder of individuality'". Real freedom does not stand in conflict with obedience, but is its other side. He was also persuaded by Burke's arguments about the social contract, including that most parties to the contract are either dead or not yet born. To forget this, he wrote – to throw away customs and institutions – is to "place the present members of society in a dictatorial dominance over those who went before, and those who came after them". Scruton argued a nation and its people must have more of a trust-like relation than a social contract, and act as trustees on behalf of their ancestors and descendants.

Beliefs which appear to be examples of prejudice may be useful and important, he wrote: "our most necessary beliefs may be both unjustified and unjustifiable, from our own perspective, and the attempt to justify them will merely lead to their loss." A prejudice in favour of modesty in women and chivalry in men, for example, may aid the stability of sexual relationships and the raising of children, although these are not offered as reasons in support of the prejudice. It may therefore be easy to show the prejudice as irrational, but there will be a loss nonetheless if it is discarded.

Scruton discussing the European Union and the nation state, November 2015

In Arguments for Conservatism (2006), Scruton marked out the areas in which philosophical thinking is required if conservatism is to be intellectually persuasive. He argued that human beings are creatures of limited and local affections. Territorial loyalty is at the root of all forms of government where law and liberty reign supreme; every expansion of jurisdiction beyond the frontiers of the nation state leads to a decline in accountability.

He opposed elevating the "nation" above its people, which would threaten rather than facilitate citizenship and peace. "Conservatism and conservation" are two aspects of a single policy, that of husbanding resources, including the social capital embodied in laws, customs and institutions, and the material capital contained in the environment. He further argued the law should not be used as a weapon to advance special interests. People impatient for reform – for example in the areas of euthanasia or abortion – are reluctant to accept what may be "glaringly obvious to others – that the law exists precisely to impede their ambitions".

=== Postmodernism ===
Scruton defines post-modernism as the claim that there are no grounds for truth, objectivity, and meaning, and that conflicts between views are therefore nothing more than contests of power. Scruton argued that while the West is required to judge other cultures in their own terms, Western culture is adversely judged as ethnocentric and racist. He wrote: "The very reasoning which sets out to destroy the ideas of objective truth and absolute value imposes political correctness as absolutely binding, and cultural relativism as objectively true."

=== Feminism ===
Scruton was critical of the contemporary feminist movement, while reserving praise for suffragists such as Mary Wollstonecraft. However, he praised Germaine Greer in 2016, saying she had "cast an awful lot of light on our literary tradition" by showing the male as the dominant figure, and defended her against criticism for having used the word "sex" to describe the difference between men and women, rather than "gender", which Scruton called "politically correct".

=== Monarchy ===
Scruton was a supporter of constitutional monarchy, arguing it is "the light above politics, which shines down on the human bustle from a calmer and more exalted sphere". In a 1991 column for the Los Angeles Times, he argued monarchy helped create peace in Central Europe and it was "the loss of it that precipitated 70 years of conflict on the Continent".

=== Totalitarianism ===
Scruton defined totalitarianism as the absence of any constraint on central authority, with every aspect of life the concern of government. Advocates of totalitarianism feed on resentment, Scruton argues, and having seized power they proceed to abolish institutions – such as the law, property, and religion – that create authorities: "To the resentful it is these institutions that are the cause of inequality, and therefore the cause of their humiliations and failures." He argued revolutions are not conducted from below by the people, but from above, in the name of the people, by an aspiring elite.

The importance of Newspeak in totalitarian societies, he writes, is that the power of language to describe reality is replaced by language whose purpose is to avoid encounters with realities. He agrees with Alain Besançon that the totalitarian society envisaged by George Orwell in Nineteen Eighty-Four (1949) can be only understood in theological terms, as a society founded on a transcendental negation. In accordance with T. S. Eliot, Scruton believes true originality is only possible within a tradition, and that it is precisely in modern conditions – conditions of fragmentation, heresy, and unbelief – that the conservative project acquires its sense.

=== English independence ===
In 2014, Scruton said he supported English independence because he believed it would uphold friendship between England, Scotland, Wales, and Northern Ireland, and because the English would have a say in all matters. In 2019, when asked if he believed in English independence, he told the New Statesman:

No, I don't think I've ever really favoured English independence. My view is that if the Scots want to be independent then we should aim for the same thing ... I don't think the Welsh want independence, the Northern Irish certainly don't. The Scottish desire for independence is, to some extent, a fabrication. They want to identify themselves as Scots but still ... enjoy the subsidy they get from being part of the kingdom. I can see there are Scottish nationalists who envision something more than that, but if that becomes a real political force then yeah, we should try for independence too. As it is, as you know, the Scots have two votes: they can vote for their own parliament and vote to put their people into our parliament, who come to our parliament with no interest in Scotland but an interest in bullying us.

=== British sovereignty ===
Scruton strongly supported Brexit, because he viewed the European Union as a threat to the sovereignty of the United Kingdom and that Brexit would help retain national identity, which he saw as under threat as a result of mass immigration, and because he opposed the Common Agricultural Policy. He also opposed the metrification of weights and measures and believed it was an 'affront to the British people, its history and its long established patterns of trade'.

== Awards ==
External image

Roger Scruton at Buckingham Palace

For his work with the Jan Hus Educational Foundation in communist Czechoslovakia, Scruton was awarded the First of June Prize in 1993 by the Czech city of Plzeň. In 1998 Václav Havel, president of the Czech Republic, presented him with the Medal of Merit (First Class). In the UK, he was knighted in the 2016 Birthday Honours for "services to philosophy, teaching and public education". His family accompanied him to the ceremony, which was performed by Prince Charles at Buckingham Palace.

In 1998, Scruton was awarded a honorary doctorate in philosophy by Masaryk University. In 2012, Hillsdale College awarded him a honorary doctorate of letters. In 2016 the European University of Tirana awarded him with a Doctor Honoris Causa.

In 2016, Scruton received the Sappho Award of the Danish Free Press Society. Polish President Andrzej Duda presented Scruton with the Grand Cross of the Order of Merit of the Republic of Poland in June 2019 "for supporting the democratic transformation in Poland". In November that year, the Senate of the Czech Parliament awarded him with a silver medal for his work in support of Czech dissidents. The next month, during a ceremony in London, Hungarian Prime Minister Viktor Orbán presented him with the Hungarian Order of Merit, Commander's Cross with Star.

- 1998: First Class of the Medal of Merit of the Czech Republic
- 2015: Knight Bachelor
- 2019: First Class of the Grand Cross of the Order of Merit of the Republic of Poland
- 2019: Commander's Cross with Star of the Hungarian Order of Merit

== Death ==
After learning in July 2019 that he had lung cancer, Scruton underwent treatment, including chemotherapy. He died at Cromwell Hospital in London on 12 January 2020, at the age of 75. The next day, Prime Minister Boris Johnson wrote: "We have lost the greatest modern conservative thinker – who not only had the guts to say what he thought but said it beautifully." The Chancellor of the Exchequer, Sajid Javid, referred to Scruton's work behind the Iron Curtain: "From his support for freedom fighters in Eastern Europe to his immense intellectual contribution to conservatism in the West, he made a unique contribution to public life."

Mario Vargas Llosa, a winner of the Nobel Prize in Literature, wrote: "[Scruton] was one of the most educated people I have ever met. He could speak of music, literature, archaeology, wine, philosophy, Greece, Rome, the Bible and a thousand subjects more than an expert, although he was not an expert on anything, because, in fact, he was a humanist in the classical style ... Scruton's departure leaves a dreadful void around us."

Conservative MEP Daniel Hannan called Scruton "the greatest conservative of our age", adding: "The country has lost a towering intellect. I have lost a wonderful friend." Robert Jenrick, the Secretary of State for Housing, Communities and Local Government, said Scruton's work on "building more beautifully, submitted recently to my department, will proceed and stand part of his unusually rich legacy". The scholar and former politician Ayaan Hirsi Ali described him as a "dear and generous friend, who gave freely to those who sought advice and wisdom, and he expected little in return".

Another friend and colleague, Douglas Murray, paid tribute to Scruton's personal kindness, calling him "one of the kindest, most encouraging, thoughtful, and generous people you could ever have known". Others who paid tribute to Scruton included education reformer Katharine Birbalsingh, historian Timothy Garton Ash, Christian philosopher Douglas Groothuis, Islamic scholar Hamza Yusuf, and cabinet minister Michael Gove, who called Scruton "an intellectual giant, a brilliantly clear and compelling writer".

In an essay critical of Scruton's philosophy of aesthetics, "The Art of Madness and Mystery", published in Church Life (a journal of the University of Notre Dame's McGrath Institute) shortly after Scruton's death, Michael Shindler wrote that "like the Roman guard who would not abandon his post during the cataclysm of Pompeii, the late Roger Scruton stands in lonesome majesty as the artistic tradition's greatest defender athwart modernity's aesthetic upheaval."

Scruton's funeral was held on 24 January 2020 at Malmesbury Abbey with the attendance of several peers, Conservative politicians, and Hungarian Prime Minister Viktor Orbán. After the ceremony, which was presided by the Reverend Oliver Ross, Scruton's remains were buried in the yard of All Saints Church, Garsdon.

== Legacy ==
Scruton has been cited as a major influence by Italian politician and Prime Minister Giorgia Meloni and her party Brothers of Italy, and Swedish politicians Mattias Karlsson and Jimmie Åkesson of the Sweden Democrats party. His philosophy has also influenced the Mathias Corvinus Collegium and the European Conservatives and Reformists Group.

The Roger Scruton Legacy Foundation awards the Sir Roger Scruton Prize of $50,000 and a silver medal; the first recipient was Jordan Peterson in 2022. The Prize is awarded by a committee whose members include Rémi Brague, Léon Krier, Lucy Neville-Rolfe, Ignat Solzhenitsyn and Michael Žantovský.

== Selected works ==
Nonfiction

- Art And Imagination: A Study in the Philosophy of Mind (London: Routledge & Kegan Paul, 1974)
- The Aesthetics of Architecture (Princeton: Princeton University Press, 1979)
- The Meaning of Conservatism (1980)
- The Politics of Culture and Other Essays (Manchester: Carcanet Press, 1981)
- A Short History of Modern Philosophy (1982)
- A Dictionary of Political Thought (1982)
- The Aesthetic Understanding: Essays in the Philosophy of Art and Culture (Manchester: Carcanet Press, 1983)
- Kant (1982)
- Untimely Tracts (1985)
- Thinkers of the New Left (1985)
- Sexual Desire (1986)
- Spinoza (1986), republished as Spinoza: A Very Short Introduction (2002)
- A Land Held Hostage: Lebanon and the West (1987)
- Conservative Thinkers: Essays from The Salisbury Review (1988)
- Philosopher on Dover Beach: Essays (Manchester: Carcanet Press, 1990)
- Conservative Texts: An Anthology (ed.) (1992)
- Modern Philosophy: A Survey (London: Sinclair-Stevenson, 1994)
- The Classical Vernacular: Architectural Principles in an Age of Nihilism (1995)
- An Intelligent Person's Guide to Philosophy (1996); republished as Philosophy: Principles and Problems (2005)
- The Aesthetics of Music (1997)
- On Hunting (1998)
- An Intelligent Person's Guide to Modern Culture (1998); republished as Modern Culture (2005)
- Animal Rights and Wrongs (2000)
- England: An Elegy (2001)
- The West and the Rest: Globalisation and the Terrorist Threat (2002)
- Death-Devoted Heart: Sex and the Sacred in Wagner's Tristan und Isolde (Oxford University Press, 2004)
- News From Somewhere: On Settling (2004)
- The Need for Nations (2004)
- Gentle Regrets: Thoughts from a Life (Continuum, 2005)
- A Political Philosophy: Arguments for Conservatism (2006)
- "Immigration, Multiculturalism and the Need to Defend the Nation State" Speech to Vlaam Belang, Antwerp, June 23, 2006.
- Culture Counts: Faith and Feeling in a World Besieged (Encounter Books, 2007)
- Beauty (2009)
- I Drink Therefore I Am: A Philosopher's Guide to Wine (2009)
- Understanding Music (2009)
- The Uses of Pessimism: And the Danger of False Hope (2010)
- Liberty and Civilization: The Western Heritage (2010)
- Green Philosophy: How to Think Seriously About the Planet (2011); revised and republished as How to Think Seriously About the Planet: The Case for an Environmental Conservatism (2012)
- The Face of God: The Gifford Lectures (2012)
- Our Church: A Personal History of the Church of England (2012)
- The Soul of the World (2014)
- How to Be a Conservative (2014)
- Fools, Frauds and Firebrands: Thinkers of the New Left (2015)
- The Ring of Truth: The Wisdom of Wagner's Ring of the Nibelung (2016)
- Conversations with Roger Scruton (2016)
- Where We Are (2017)
- Confessions of a Heretic: Selected Essays (2016)
- On Human Nature (2017)
- Conservatism: An Invitation to the Great Tradition (2017)
- Music as an Art (2018)
- Wagner's Parsifal: The Music of Redemption (2020)
- Against the Tide: The best of Roger Scruton's columns, commentaries and criticism (2022)

Fiction

- Fortnight's Anger (1981)
- Francesca (1991)
- A Dove Descending and Other Stories (1991)
- Xanthippic Dialogues (1993)
- Perictione in Colophon: Reflections of the Aesthetic Way of Life (2000)
- Notes from Underground (2014)
- The Disappeared (2015)
- Souls in the Twilight: Stories of Loss (2018)

Opera

- The Minister (1994).
- Violet (2005)

Television

- Why Beauty Matters (BBC Two, 2009)

== See also ==
- Animal rights#Roger Scruton
- Oikophobia#Political usage
