= The Salisbury Review =

Quarterly British conservative magazine

- Editor: Myles Harris
- Categories: Conservatism; Politics; Culture; Art
- Frequency: Quarterly
- Founded: 1982
- Country: United Kingdom
- Website: salisburyreview.com

The Salisbury Review is a quarterly British "magazine of conservative thought". It was founded in 1982 by the Salisbury Group, who sought to articulate and further traditional intellectual conservative ideas.

The Review was named after Robert Gascoyne-Cecil, 3rd Marquess of Salisbury, the British prime minister at the end of the nineteenth century. The philosopher Roger Scruton was the chief editor for eighteen years and published it through his Claridge Press. From 2000 the editor was the historian and hoaxer A. D. Harvey. The managing editor from 2006 to 2012 was Merrie Cave. The editor as of 2012 is Myles Harris who is a practising doctor and journalist.

Contributors have included Antony Flew, Christie Davies, Enoch Powell, Margaret Thatcher, Václav Havel, Hugh Trevor-Roper, Aleksandr Solzhenitsyn, Norman Stone, Theodore Dalrymple, Roger Watson and Peter Mullen.

== History ==
The publication was founded in 1982 by the Salisbury Group, who chose Roger Scruton as editor for his defence of traditional conservatism in The Meaning of Conservatism (1980) in opposition to the Thatcherite proponents of the free market. The Salisbury group itself was set up in 1978 to support the view of the Third Marquess of Salisbury that "good government consisted of doing as little as possible."

In The Spectator of 21 September 2002 Scruton wrote an article, "My Life Beyond the Pale", in which he explained what he saw as the difficulties "of finding people to write in an explicitly conservative journal". He noted that finding subscribers was initially difficult, and that Maurice Cowling had told him that to "try to encapsulate [conservatism] in a philosophy was the kind of quaint project that Americans might undertake". He also wrote that the editorship

"had cost me many thousand hours of unpaid labour, a hideous character assassination in Private Eye, three lawsuits, two interrogations, one expulsion, the loss of a university career in Britain, unendingly contemptuous reviews, Tory suspicion, and the hatred of decent liberals everywhere. And it was worth it."

== Honeyford affair ==
A controversy involving Ray Honeyford, headmaster of Drummond Middle School in Bradford, Yorkshire, gave The Salisbury Review much publicity in 1984. According to Scruton: "This episode was our first great success, and led to the 600 subscriptions that we needed."

An article written by Honeyford for the Review in 1984 discussed themes on ethnicity, culture and assimilation, and educational performance. He had already made public his views in two letters in 1982, to the Times Educational Supplement (TES) and a local Bradford paper, and then in an extended article in the TES in November 1982. In that, he rehearsed a number of points, in particular on where the onus for integration and the limiting factors for educational performance lie in the home family environment in immigrant families. He attacked what he saw as the misplaced use of multiculturalism in schools, and 'political correctness' in the form of scrutiny of textbook material.

The 1984 Salisbury Review article "Education and Race — an Alternative View" covered similar ground, but caused a national outcry. Honeyford had already been in discussion with his local education authority after the 1982 TES article, in the context of Bradford Council guidelines on educational aims issued in that year, but had not been disciplined. After the second article he was disciplined, and was also the target of a campaign for his dismissal. He was sacked, reinstated and then took early retirement, about two years after The Salisbury Review article was published.

== See also ==
- List of literary magazines
- Encounter (UK)
- Quadrant (Australia)
- The Dorchester Review (Canada)

== References and sources ==
=== Sources ===
- Halstead, Mark. (1988) Education, Justice and Cultural Diversity: an Examination of the Honeyford Affair, 1984-85.
