= Notes from Underground (Scruton novel) =

Book by Roger Scruton

- Cover of the first edition
- Author: Roger Scruton
- Language: English
- Genre: Political fiction
- Publisher: Beaufort Books
- Publication date: 12 March 2014
- Publication place: United States
- Media type: Print (hardcover)
- Pages: 244
- ISBN: 9780825307287

Notes from Underground is a 2014 novel by the English writer Roger Scruton. It is set in Prague in the 1980s and follows a young Czech writer, Jan Reichl, who becomes involved with an underground intellectual scene. Jan ends up in the United States where he later, in the early 21st century, examines his experiences. The title references Fyodor Dostoyevsky's novel with the same title. The book received the bronze prize in the "Suspense / Thriller" category at the 2015 Independent Publisher Book Awards.

== Composition ==
From 1979 until he was expelled from Czechoslovakia in the mid-1980s, Roger Scruton had been involved in setting up an underground university in Prague in collaboration with the dissident Jiří Müller. Scruton noted that many of the young people he encountered could not be described as dissidents of the kind that Western media were promoting, as being a dissident had become a social status in itself, unobtainable for most people.

According to Scruton, he made several failed attempts to make use of these experiences. He eventually came up with the storyline which became Notes from Underground, after which "the novel wrote itself". The title is taken from Fyodor Dostoevsky's novel Notes from Underground, and refers to the characters' inability to escape their situation.

== Publication ==
The book was published on 12 March 2014 through Beaufort Books in New York City. On 17 April, the Hudson Institute organised a panel discussion about the book in Washington, D.C. featuring Scruton, the Czech ambassador to the United States Petr Gandalovič, and the Danube Institute's director John O'Sullivan.

== Reception ==
Meghan Cox Gurdon reviewed the book in Forbes:

Like its British author, a philosopher and public intellectual who has published forty books and two operas, Notes from Underground is deeply humane, sensitive and unflinching. In its elegantly-written pages we find a quietly brutal depiction of people trying to make real lives for themselves – for their minds and souls – amid the interlocking snares of totalitarianism and its special set of lies. Through this book, we feel what it was to breathe that stale, choking air whilst trying not to show any feeling at all, lest it draw attention.

Publishers Weekly wrote:

Philosopher and activist in Eastern Europe Scruton (The Meaning of Conservatism) weaves references to literature, the subway, and dissident movements into both his title and this bittersweet tale, set in Prague during the twilight of Communist Czechoslovakia. ... A familiarity with Czech culture and history will enhance the reader’s experience, but Scruton’s prose will satisfy anyone with an interest in this place and period.

Robin Ashenden of the Central and Eastern European London Review wrote:

This is not an easy book to read – it wrenches you out of everyday life and even a couple of readings make you feel you’ve barely scratched at it – but it is a profoundly rewarding one. Deep and serious things seem to be happening at every turn beneath the lines, and a wealth of Czech culture – folksongs, fairy tales, Janáček, Kundera and Hrabal – spreads its magnetic patterns through the text. The book feels written out of a deep stillness and silence, and demands and repays it in return.
