= Flather =

Flather may refer to:

== People ==
- Gary Flather (1937–2017), an English barrister and disability rights campaigner.
- Mathew Flathers (c.1580–1607), English Roman Catholic priest.
- Paul Flather (born 1954), a British academic.
- Shreela Flather, Baroness Flather (born 1934), a British-Indian politician.

== Other ==
- Flather Hall, a dormitory for students at The Catholic University of America.
