= Tomin (surname) =

Tomin or Tomyn is a Slavic surname. It may refer to

- Julius Tomin (born 1938), Czech philosopher
- Július Tomin (Interlingua) (1915–2003), Czech author
- Mikhail Piatrovich Tomin (1883–1967), Soviet lichenologist
- Mykola Tomyn (born 1948), Ukrainian handball player
- William Tomyn (1905–1972), Canadian politician and teacher
- Zdena Tomin (born 1941), Czech novelist

== See also ==
- Tomin (disambiguation)
- Tonin (name)
