= Henry Pelling =

British historian

Henry Mathison Pelling (27 August 1920 – 14 October 1997) was a British historian best known for his works on the history of the British Labour Party.

== Life ==
Pelling was born in Prenton, Wirral, the son of a wealthy stockbroker. He was educated at Birkenhead School and St John's College, Cambridge, where he gained firsts in Part I of the Classical tripos and Part II of the Historical tripos prior to completing a PhD in 1950. He began his career as a fellow at Queen's College, Oxford, where he remained until his return to St John's in 1966. He was Reader in British History at Cambridge from 1976 to 1980, at which point he decided to retire from university teaching. Doing so, however, led St John's to terminate his college fellowship as well, much to his chagrin, and it was only after a great deal of protest that he was reinstated (an interregnum he referred to thereafter as socius ejectus, in imitation of Thomas Baker). He was elected a Fellow of the British Academy (FBA) in 1992. Pelling's collection of British left-wing political pamphlets is held at Senate House Library, while his papers are lodged with St John's College.

== Publications ==
- The Origins of the Labour Party, 1880–1900 (London: Macmillan, 1954) — second edition Oxford: Clarendon, 1965
- The Challenge of Socialism (London: Adam and Charles Black, 1954) — edited by Pelling
- America and the British Left from Bright to Bevan (London: Adam and Charles Black, 1956) — New York University Press in the U.S.
- The British Communist Party: A Historical Profile (London: Adam and Charles Black, 1958)
- Labour and Politics, 1900–1906: A History of the Labour Representation Committee (London: Macmillan, 1958) — co-written with Frank Bealey
- Modern Britain, 1885–1955 (Edinburgh: Nelson, 1960) — W. W. Norton in the U.S.
- American Labor (Chicago: University of Chicago Press, 1960)
- Chūshichi Tsuzuki, H. M. Hyndman and British Socialism (London: Oxford University Press, 1961) — prepared for publication by Pelling
- A Short History of the Labour Party (London: Macmillan, 1961) — later editions co-written with Alastair J. Reid
- A History of British Trade Unionism (London: Macmillan, 1963)
- Social Geography of British Elections, 1885–1910 (London: Macmillan, 1967)
- Popular Politics and Society in Late Victorian Britain (London and Basingstoke: Macmillan, 1968)
- Britain and the Second World War (London: Collins, 1970)
- Winston Churchill (London and Basingstoke: Macmillan, 1974)
- The Labour Governments, 1945–1951 (London and Basingstoke: Macmillan, 1984)
- Britain and the Marshall Plan (London and Basingstoke: Macmillan, 1988)
- Churchill's Peacetime Ministry, 1951–1955 (London and Basingstoke: Macmillan, 1997) — St. Martin's Press in the U.S.
