= Tomin (disambiguation) =

Tomin is an antiquated Spanish unit of weight and currency. It may also refer to:

- Qendër Tomin, a former municipality in Albania
- Sarv Tomin, a village in Iran
- Tomin, a village in Syria
- El Tomin Airport in Colombia
- Tomin (surname)
