= Forum for European Philosophy =

The Forum for Philosophy (previously, the Forum for European Philosophy, 1996–2018), founded in 1996, is a nonprofit philosophical organization whose purpose is to promote philosophy. The Forum is not aligned with any particular school of philosophical thought and its aim is to make philosophy accessible to the largest number of people. The organization hosts free weekly discussions in the London School of Economics, from which it produces regular podcasts. The Forum also publishes an essay series.

== Activities ==
The Forum supports the following:

- Free, weekly discussions
- Podcasts
- Essays
- Thinking in Public grant
- Co-sponsor of the annual SEP-FEP conference

== People ==
Patrons
Alan Bekhor
Remo Bodei
Vincent Descombes
Axel Honneth
Onora O’Neill
Quentin Skinner
Charles Taylor

People
Position	Name	Years
President	Paul Flather	2018-
Emeritus President	Alan Montefiore	1996-2018
Chair	Catherine Audard	1996-
Vice Chair	Hillary Lawson	
Hon. Treasurer	Stephen Lewis	
Director	Elizabeth Hannon	2018-
Fellow	Shahidha Bari	2016-
Fellow	Jonathan Birch	2015-
Fellow	Sarah Fine	2017-
Fellow	Clare Moriarty	2017-
Fellow	Danielle Sands	2015-

Past
Position	Name	Years
Director	Simon Glendinning	2004-18
Fellow	Peter Dennis	2014-17
Fellow	Tali Sharot	2014-15
Fellow	Bryan Roberts	2014-15
Fellow	Gabriel Wollner	2014-15
Deputy Director	Kristina Musholt	
Associate Director	Juliana Cardinale	-2015
