= Jan Hus Educational Foundation =

Underground education network in Czechoslovakia

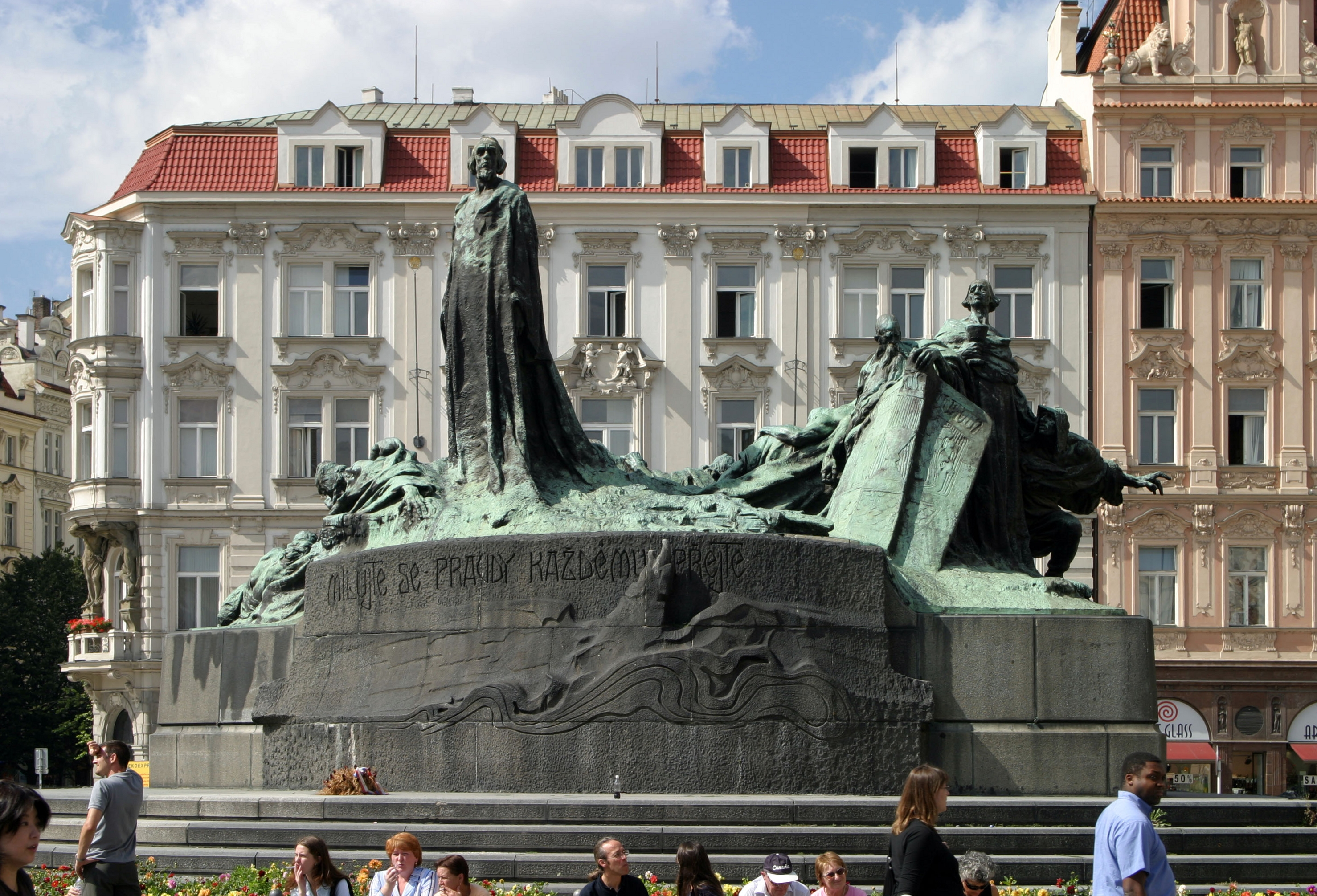
- The Jan Hus statue in Prague, Czech Republic
- Founded: May 1980
- Founder: Faculty of Divinity, University of Cambridge
- Purpose: Underground education network in communist Czechoslovakia
- Headquarters: Brno, Czech Republic
- Website: Jan Hus Educational Foundation

The Jan Hus Educational Foundation was founded in May 1980 by a group of British philosophers at the University of Cambridge. The group operated an underground education network in Czechoslovakia, then under Communist Party rule, running seminars in philosophy, smuggling in books, and arranging for Western academics to give lectures.

The Foundation was deemed a "centre of ideological subversion" by the Czech police, and several of the visiting philosophers, including Jacques Derrida, Roger Scruton and Anthony Kenny, were arrested or placed on the "Index of Undesirable Persons".

In 1998 Václav Havel, the last president of Czechoslovakia and first president of the democratic Czech Republic, awarded Roger Scruton the Medal of Merit (First Class) for his work on behalf of the students, and gave Commemorative Medals of the President of the Republic to the Foundation and two of its organizers, Barbara Day and Kathy Wilkes. In 2019 the British ambassador to the Czech Republic, Nick Archer, unveiled a plaque on the building in the Letná area of Prague in which the early seminars were held.

== Background ==
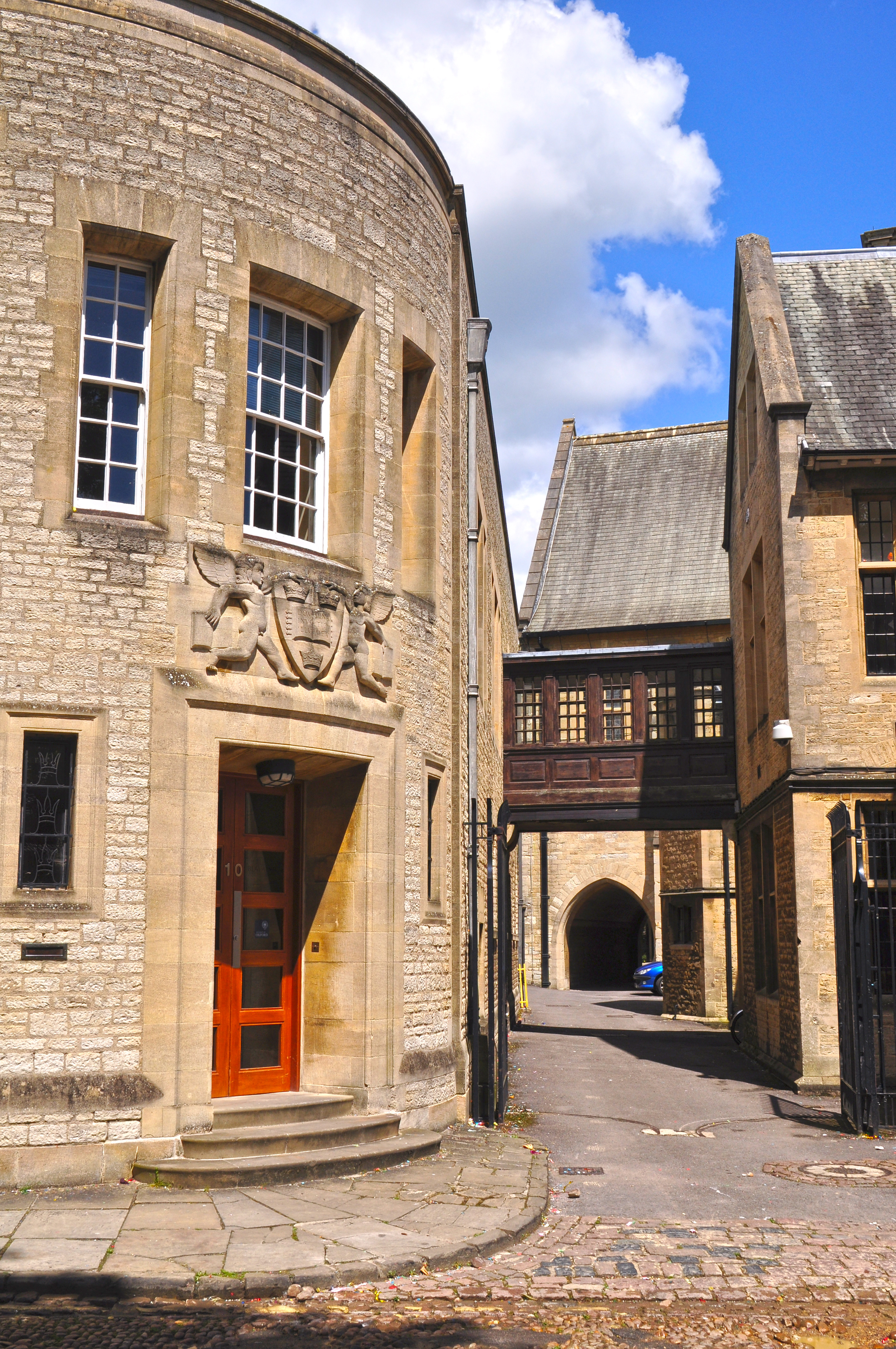
Philosophy faculty (1976–2012), 10 Merton Street, Oxford

The Foundation was created after Czech dissident philosopher Julius Tomin wrote in 1978 to four Western universities asking them to support philosophy seminars he was holding in his apartment in Prague. The seminars were known as bytové semináře ("home seminars"). Tomin called his discussion group "Jan Patočka University", after the Czech philosopher who died in 1977 after being interrogated by police.

Correspondence from the Eastern Bloc was slow and uncertain; one commentator compared it to sending a message in a bottle. Only one letter is known to have arrived at its intended destination, the philosophy faculty at the University of Oxford, one year after it was sent. The letter was read out to the faculty by William Newton-Smith of Balliol during a meeting in January 1979; the final item on the agenda was "Letter from Czechoslovakian philosophers". Those present voted to offer financial support and to send two philosophers to address the seminars. The minutes noted:

It was agreed that the Chairman (J. L. Mackie) should send a letter of support to the Czechoslovakian philosophers. It was agreed to ask the Lit. Hum [Literae Humaniores] Board to make a grant to cover the cost of sending two members of the Philosophy Sub-Faculty to meet with the Czechoslovakian philosophers."

== Seminars ==
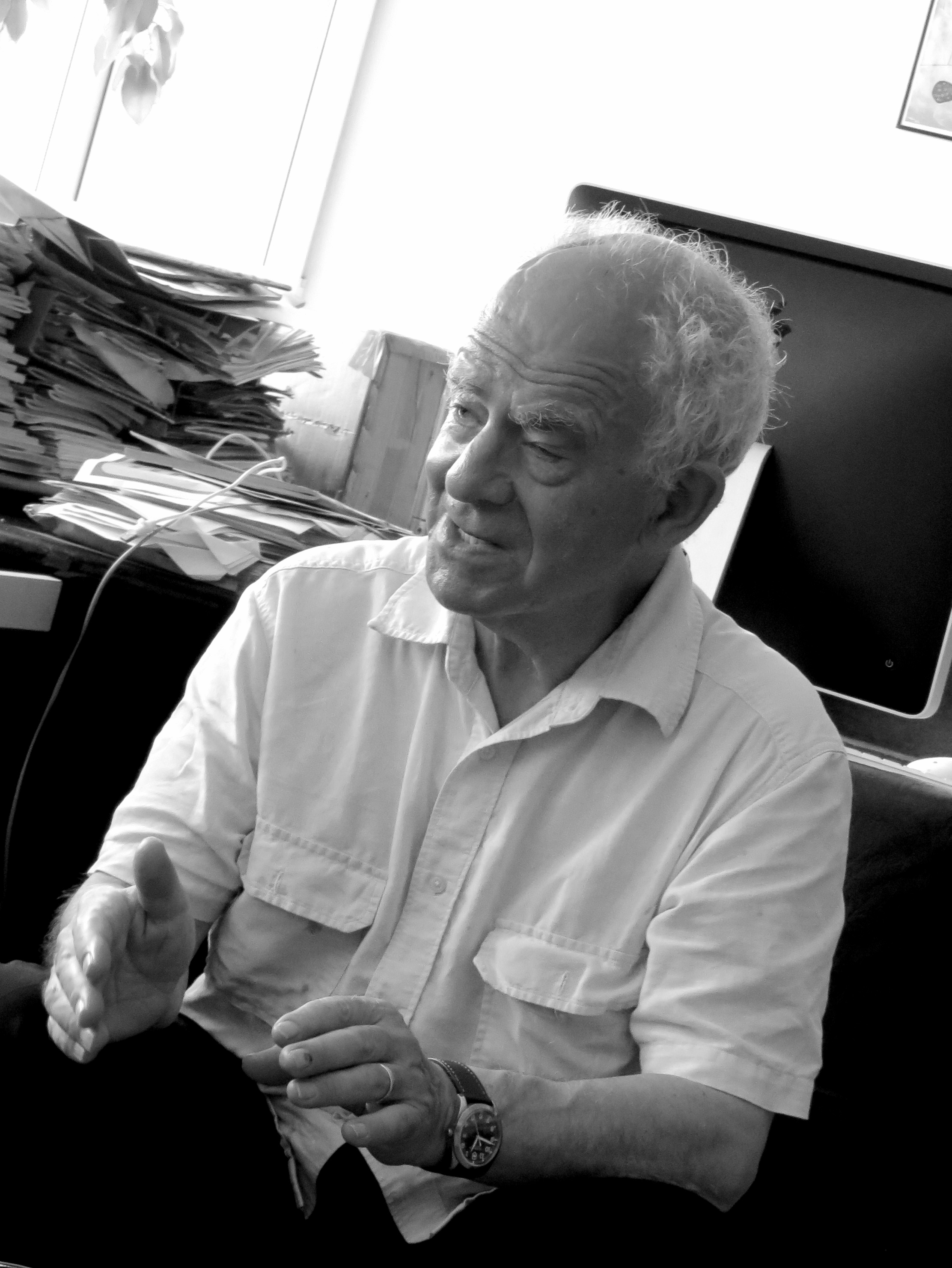
Steven Lukes, Balliol

Kathy Wilkes of St. Hilda's and Steven Lukes of Balliol were the first philosophers to visit Tomin. Wilkes visited in April 1979, carrying books for the students. Her first seminar was on Aristotle at Tomin's apartment in Keramická Street from 6 pm to midnight; she gave another a few days later, for 25 people, on "Identity of Human Personality". She told her colleagues that one of the books she took over had apparently been read by 40 people within the week.

When she returned to Oxford, Wilkes asked its Literae Humaniores board for financial support (at that time philosophy was a sub-faculty of Literae Humaniores), and urged other philosophers to pay a visit, to be coordinated by William Newton-Smith. An article appeared about the seminars in the New Statesman in May. Wilkes wrote one for The Guardian a few days later and another appeared at the end of May in Isis. The philosophy faculty agreed to send Charles Taylor of All Souls, and books were purchased with a grant from the Literae Humaniores board.

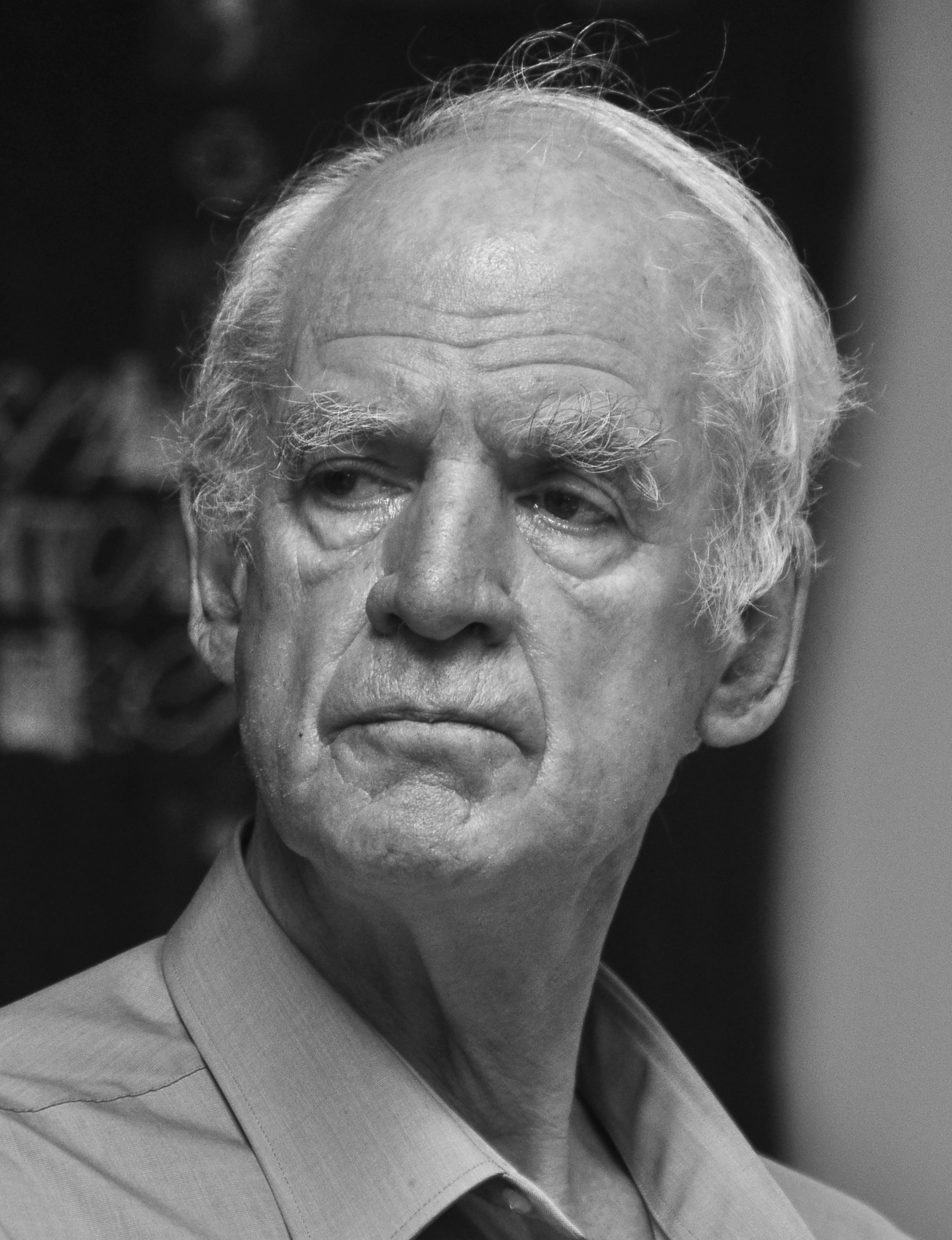
Charles Taylor, All Souls

Others who became involved included Alan Montefiore and Anthony Kenny from Oxford; Ernest Gellner from King's College, Cambridge; Roger Scruton from Birkbeck College, London; Anthony Savile from King's College, London; and Thomas Nagel from New York University. Branches of the Foundation sprang up in France and Germany. Jacques Derrida and Jean-Pierre Vernant set up the French branch in 1981 with Derrida as vice-president. Derrida, Jürgen Habermas and Ernst Tugendhat, who was born in Brno, all travelled to Czechoslovakia to conduct a seminar, as did John Keane and David Regan.

Scruton arranged for several of the students to study for the Cambridge Diploma and Certificate in Religious Studies, chosen because Cambridge was the only university that would allow the students to sit for a qualification remotely and in secret.

== Arrests, expulsions ==
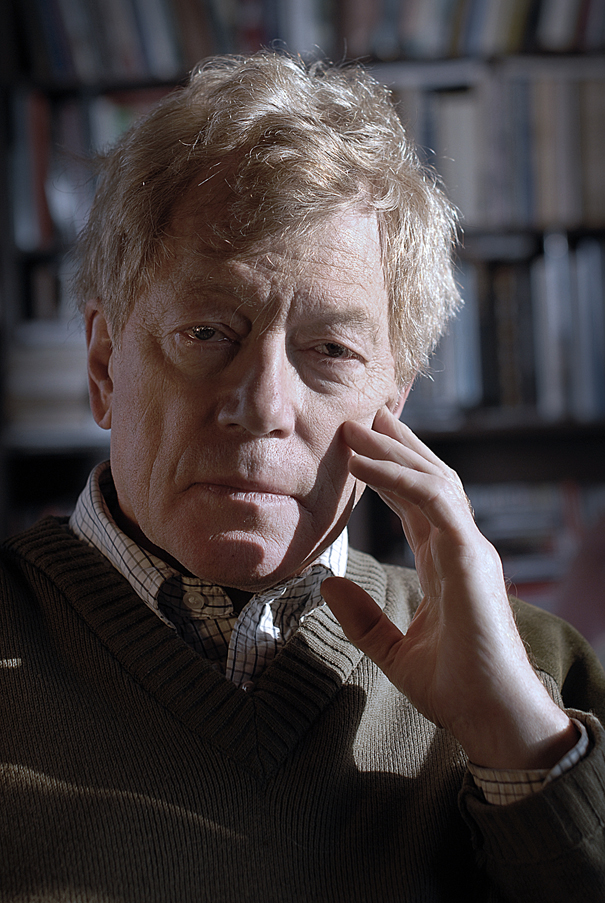
Roger Scruton, then of Birkbeck College, London

Several philosophers who travelled to give seminars were detained by the Czech police or expelled from the country. William Newton-Smith was detained in March 1980, as was Anthony Kenny, then Master of Balliol, the following month. Kathy Wilkes was arrested, searched and escorted to the airport in or around May 1980. Roger Scruton was detained in 1985 and placed on the Index of Undesirable Persons. His book Thinkers of the New Left was published that year; he said it was written in response to his experiences in the Eastern Bloc.

The most prominent arrest was that of Jacques Derrida in Prague in December 1981. He spent 24 hours in custody, supposedly for drug smuggling, after the police planted drugs in his suitcase. According to the philosopher Geoffrey Bennington:

[Derrida] goes to Prague to run a clandestine seminar. Followed for several days, stopped at the end of the week, finally arrested at the airport, and, after a police operation on his suitcase in which they pretend to discover a brown powder, he is imprisoned on the charge of "production and trafficking of drugs". Signature campaign for his release. Released ("expelled") from Czechoslovakia after an energetic intervention of [President] François Mitterrand and the French government.

Derrida had been working on Franz Kafka's "Before the Law" at the time—Kafka was born in Prague—and believed the drugs had been planted while he was visiting Kafka's grave. His Czech lawyer said the arrest was like a Kafka story, complete with nudity, photographs and a prison uniform.

== Velvet Revolution ==
The underground network was active until the Velvet Revolution saw the overthrow of the Communist Party in 1989. The Foundation continued to support education in the new Czech Republic. In October 1998 at Magdalen College, Oxford, President Václav Havel awarded the Foundation, Kathy Wilkes and Barbara Day Commemorative Medals of the President of the Republic. Roger Scruton was awarded the Medal of Merit (First Class) of the Czech Republic. A plaque was unveiled at the Faculty of Divinity at Cambridge in October 2018 to commemorate the faculty's support, and in November 2019 the British ambassador to the Czech Republic, Nick Archer, unveiled a plaque on the building in Keramická Street, in the Letná area of Prague, in which the early underground seminars were held.

== Membership ==
=== Chairs ===
- Charles Taylor (1980–1981)
- Stuart Hampshire (1981–1984)
- Claus Moser (1984–1989)
- Anthony Smith (1989–1999)

=== Trustees ===
- Catherine Audard
- Frank Bealey
- Jessica Douglas-Home
- Nancy Durham
- Paul Flather
- Helen Ganly
- Stuart Hampshire
- Andrew Lenox-Conyngham
- David Matthews
- Alan Montefiore
- Claus Moser
- Iris Murdoch
- William Newton-Smith
- Jonathan Ruffer
- Roger Scruton
- Anthony Smith
- Tom Stoppard
- Charles Taylor
- Christopher Taylor
- Ralph Walker
- Kathy Wilkes

=== Patrons ===
- A. J. Ayer
- Robert Birley
- Adrian Cadbury
- G. E. Ellison
- Miles Fitzalan-Howard
- Norman Franklin
- Antonia Fraser
- Helen Gardner
- Ernest Gellner
- Stuart Hampshire
- Yehudi Menuhin
- Hugh Montefiore
- Claus Moser
- Roger Mynors
- Harold Pinter
- Victoria Rothschild
- Honor Smith
- C. H. Sporborg
- Charles Taylor
- Rosalyn Tureck
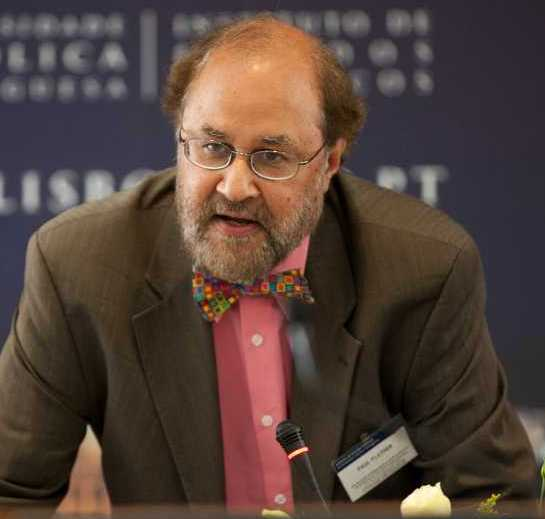
Paul Flather

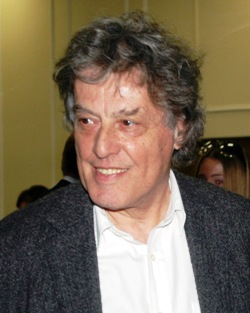
Tom Stoppard

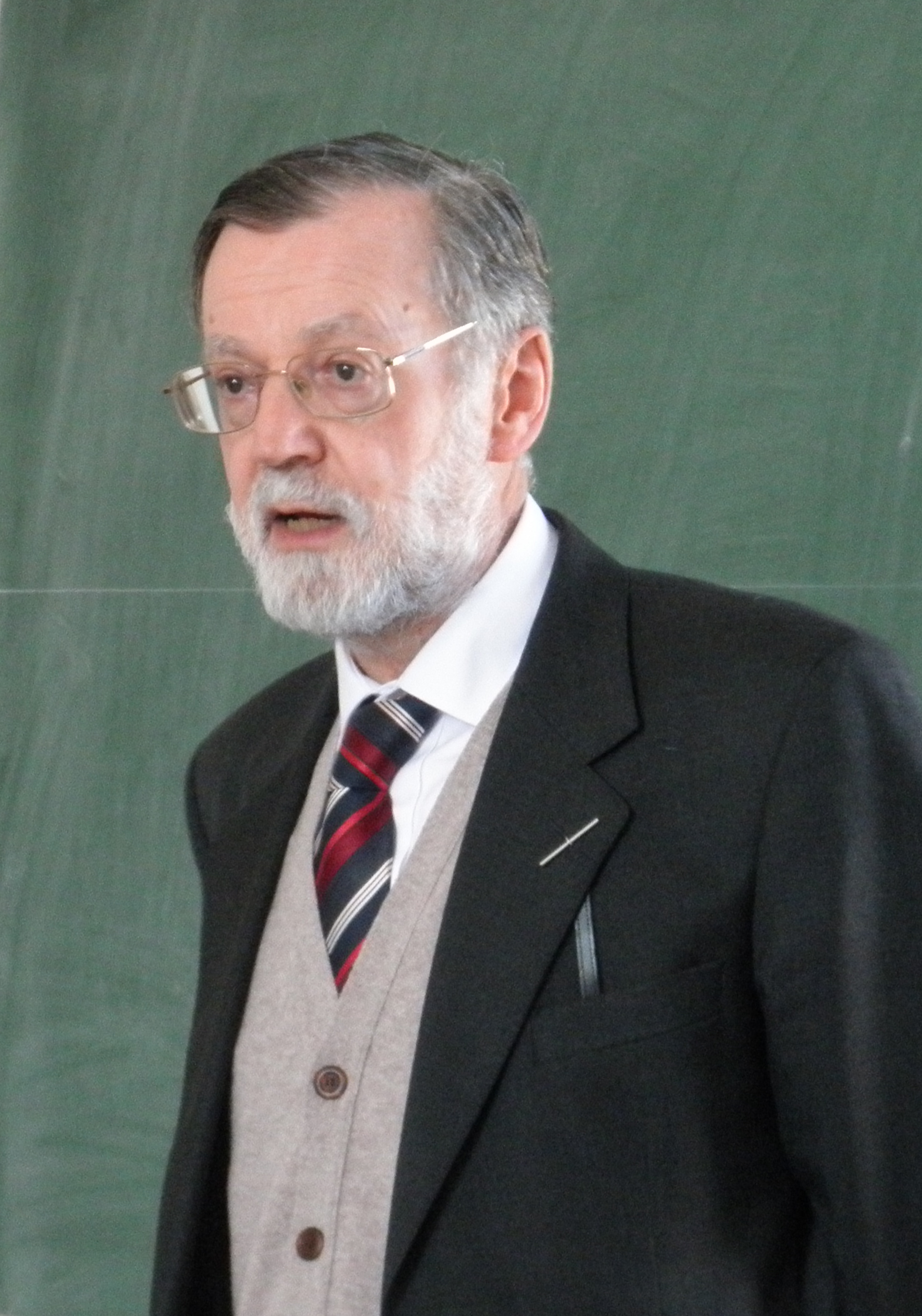
Ralph C. S. Walker

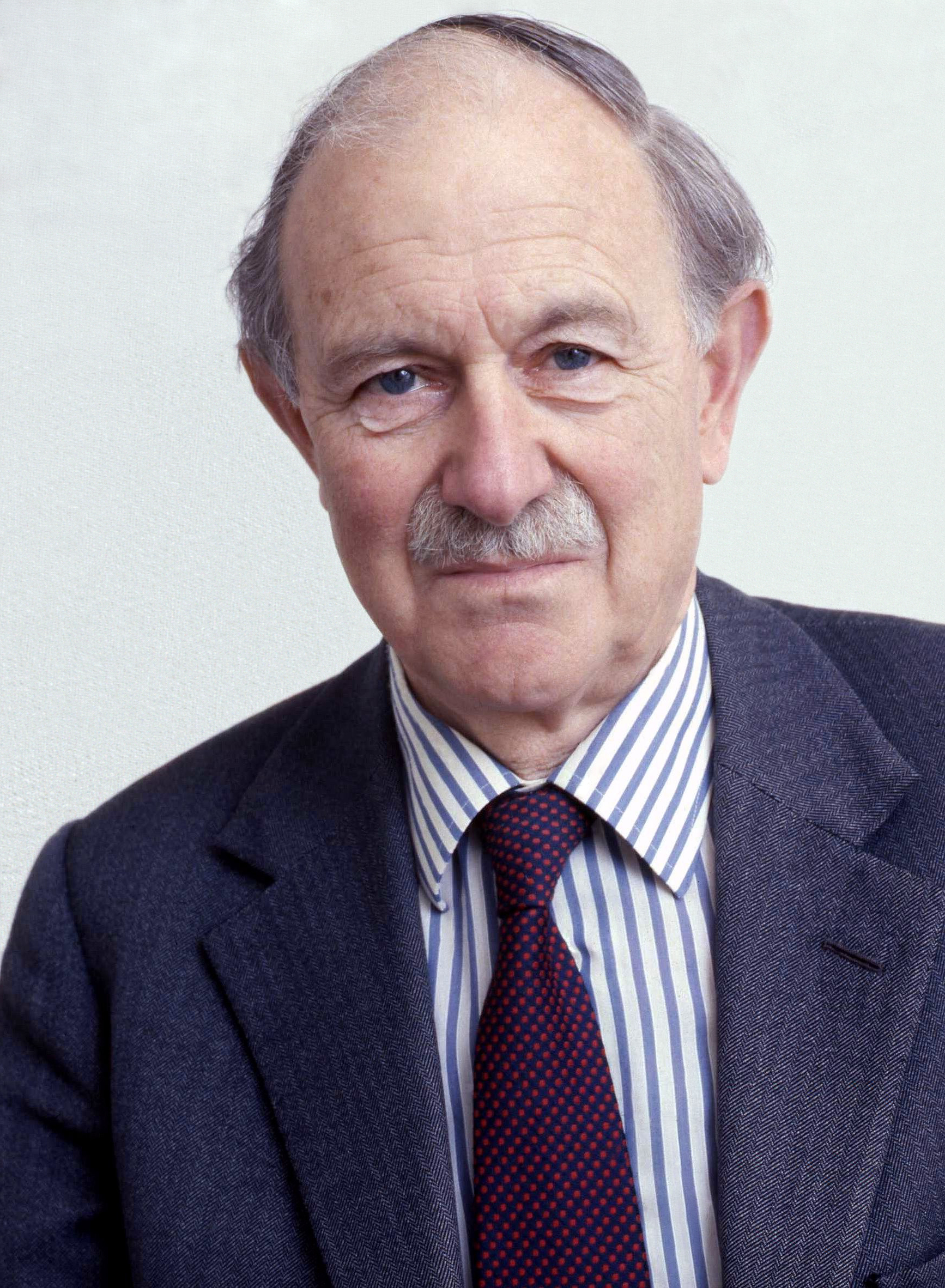
Miles Fitzalan-Howard

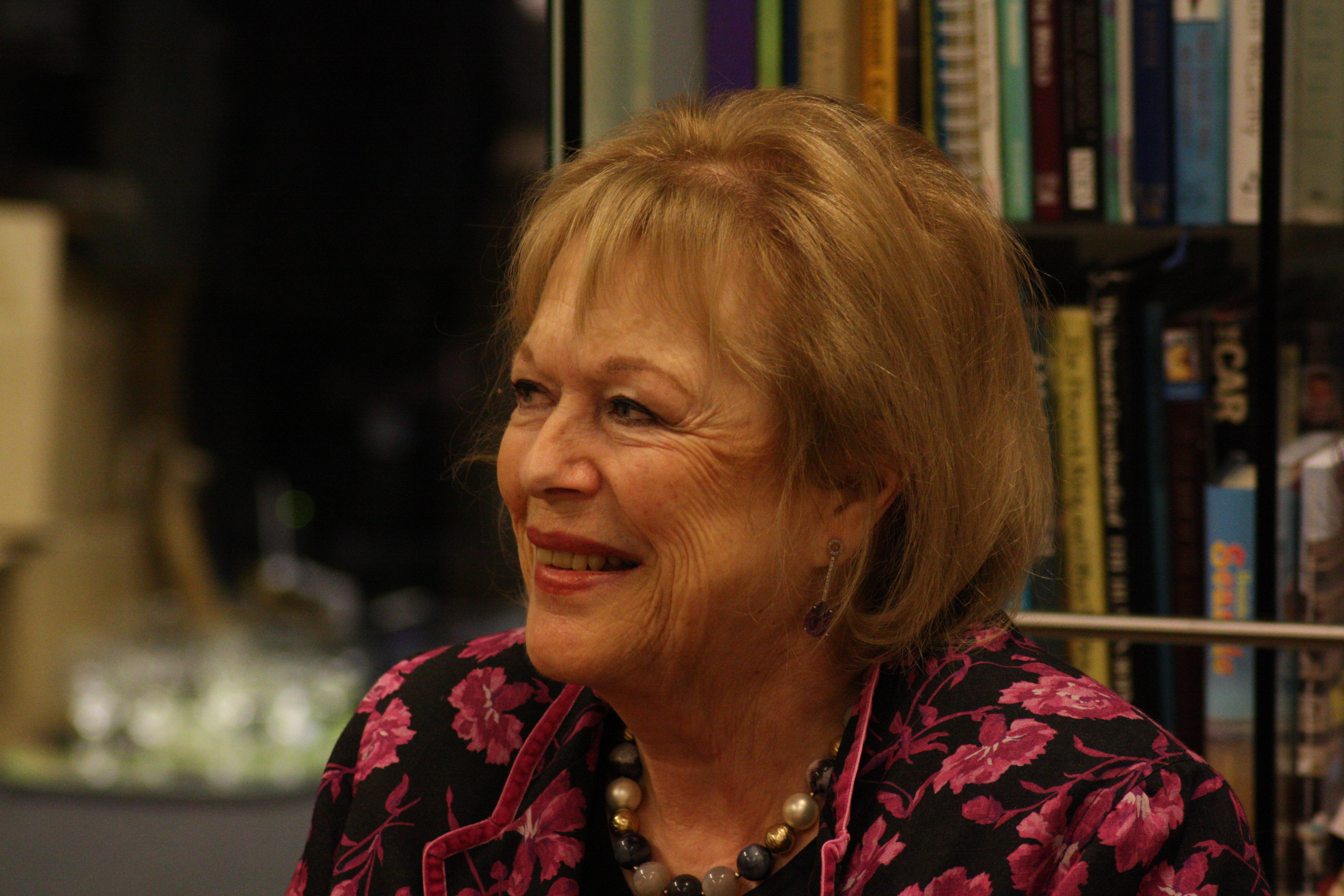
Antonia Fraser

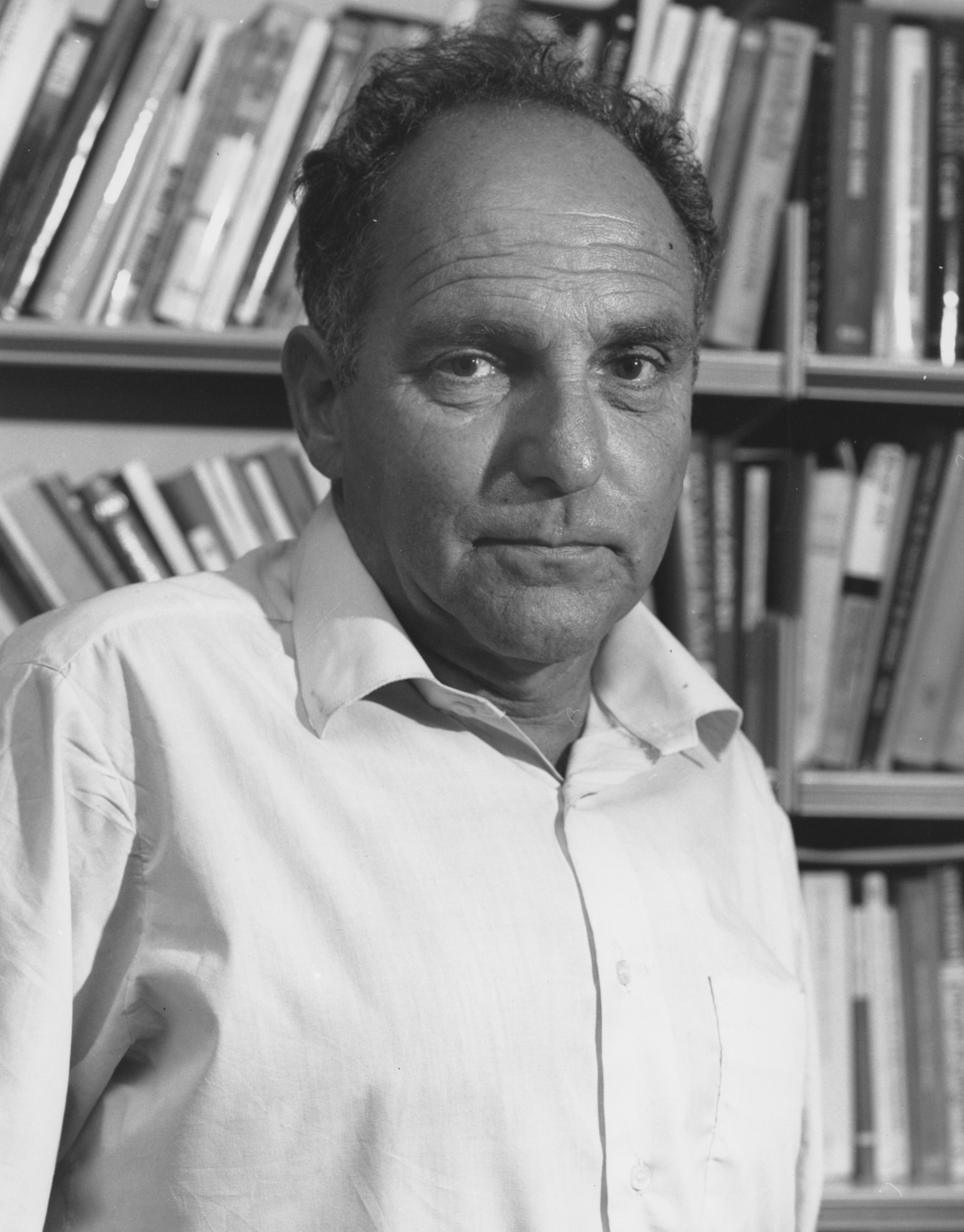
Ernest Gellner

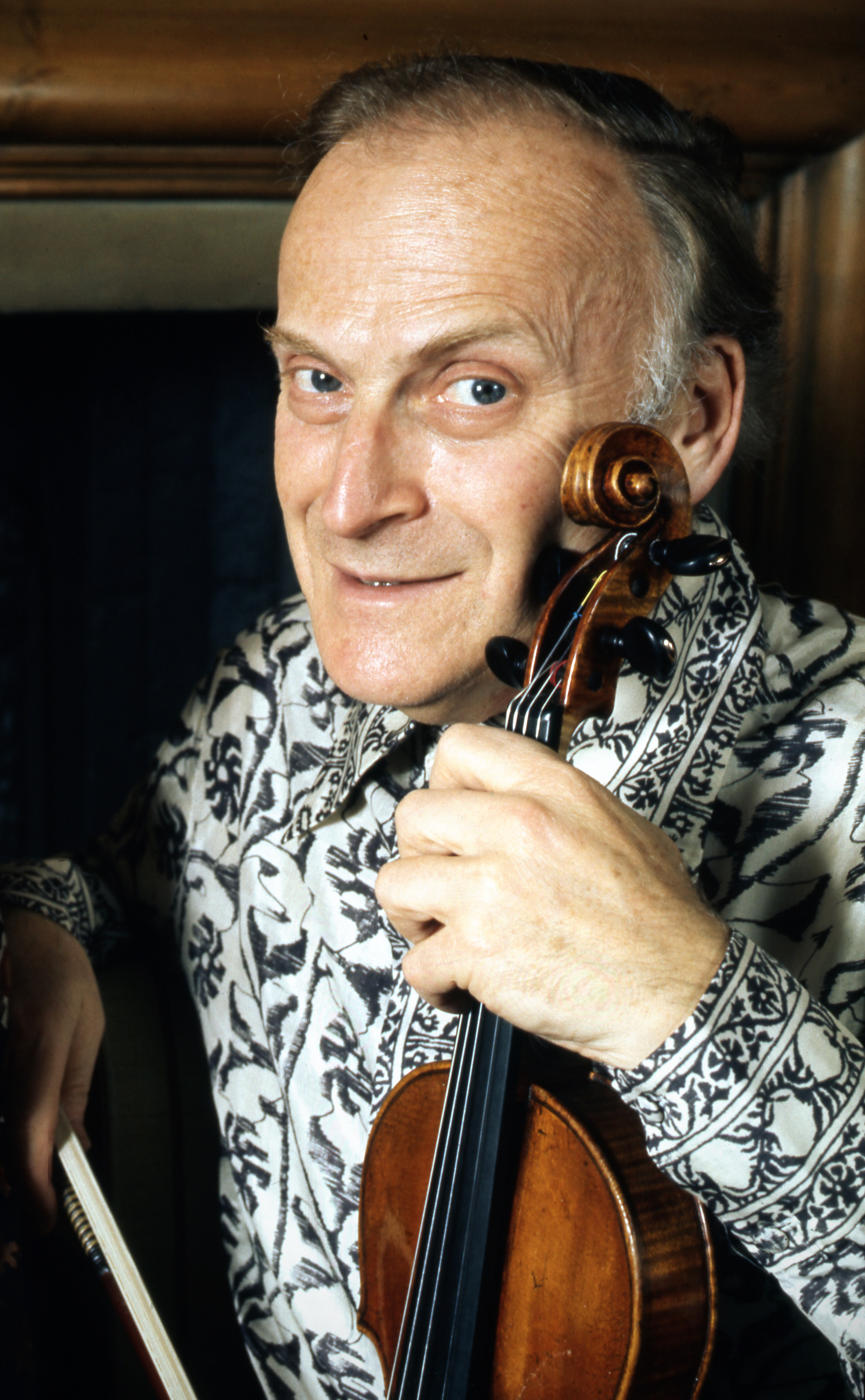
Yehudi Menuhin

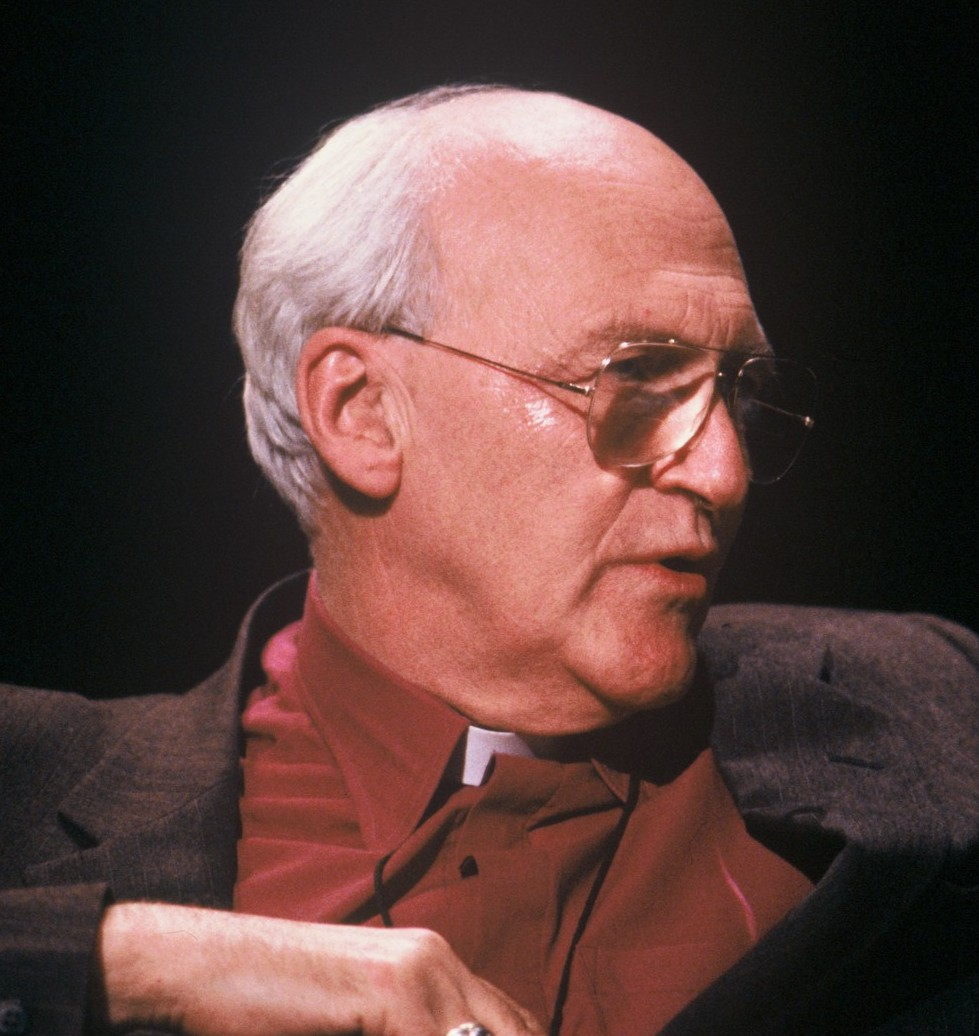
Hugh Montefiore

== See also ==
- Professional Foul (1977) by Tom Stoppard
- Notes from Underground (2014) by Roger Scruton
