= Alan Montefiore =

British philosopher (1926–2024)

Alan Claude Robin Goldsmid Montefiore (29 December 1926 – 29 October 2024) was a British philosopher and Emeritus Fellow of Balliol College, Oxford. He was a co-founder and Emeritus President of the Forum for European Philosophy, as well as Joint President of the Wiener Library, and a Chair of Council of the Froebel Educational Institute.

Montefiore was the son of Leonard Montefiore (1889–1961), who had been the Wiener Library's second president and later its chairman. He is also grandson of Claude Joseph Goldsmid Montefiore (1858–1938), a past president of the Anglo-Jewish Association. Montefiore received an Honorary Silver Medal of Jan Masaryk at the Czech Republic Ambassador's residence in London in November 2019.

== Life ==
Montefiore was born in London on 29 December 1926. He was educated at Clifton College, a boarding school with a separate house for Jewish boys. Montefiore did national service as a soldier in Singapore, where he learnt Chinese. On his return, he read PPE at Balliol College, Oxford.

Montefiore died from cardiac arrest on 29 October 2024 in Paris, at the age of 97.

== Philosophy ==
=== Writing ===
Montefiore's work tended to encompass the concerns and methods of both analytic and continental philosophical traditions, covering topics in moral and political philosophy, contemporary French philosophy, and philosophy of education.

A recurring theme of Montefiore's philosophical enquiries is the notion of identity. His philosophical arguments can be characterized as addressing four related concerns that, inevitably given his own Jewish origins, revolve around notions of Jewish identity. His book A Philosophical Retrospective summarizes his thinking so that the four themes become evident. The first concerns the issue of how far it may be in anyone’s meaningful power to determine the nature and implications of their own identity—not only but especially in the case of those who may be considered by themselves or by others to be Jews. The second concerns questions of how far the possession of a Jewish identity is to be seen as bound up with a relationship to Judaism as a system of religious belief and/or practice and of what might be the longer-term prospects for a purely secular Jewish identity, whether in Israel or in the Diaspora. The third theme concerns an apparent tension between Judaism’s claim to being both a religion of universal import and yet that of a historically very particular people. The final theme is Montefiore’s personal perspective as being identified as a Jew and whether or not the possession of a Jewish identity is to be understood as carrying with it the acceptance of any particular obligations as to how to order one’s life.

=== Other work ===
For Montefiore, philosophy is a lived practice that entails "getting one’s feet wet". This led to his involvement in a number of projects and organizations dedicated to bringing philosophers into conversation with non-philosophers and to bringing philosophy beyond the academy.

Montefiore was a founding member of the Jan Hus Educational Foundation, an underground education network, dedicated to providing philosophy books, seminars, and discussion groups for dissidents in then communist Czechoslovakia. The Foundation was recognized for its work by Václav Havel and, in 2019, Montefiore himself was awarded the Czech Ambassador’s Honorary Jan Masaryk Silver Medal.

In 1996, in keeping with his aim to bridge the divide between analytic and continental approaches to philosophy, Montefiore co-founded the Forum for European Philosophy, currently based in the London School of Economics. He served as President until 2018, when he became Emeritus President.

== Selected works ==
- Montefiore, A. (2019). Sands, D. (ed.). Philosophy and the Human Paradox: Essays on Reason, Truth, and Identity. London: Routledge. ISBN 9780367423117.
- Montefiore, A. (2011). A Philosophical Retrospective: Facts, Values, and Jewish Identity. New York: Columbia University Press. ISBN 9780231153003.
- Montefiore, A. & Vines, D., eds. (1999). Integrity in the Public and Private Domains. London: Routledge. ISBN 9780367605100.
- Montefiore, A., ed. (1983). Philosophy in France Today. Cambridge: Cambridge University Press. ISBN 9780521296731.
- Montefiore, A. (1958). A Modern Introduction to Moral Philosophy. London: Routledge. ISBN 9780367503321.
