= Frank Bealey =

British political scientist

- Frank Bealey
- Born: Frank William Bealey; 31 August 1922; Bilston
- Died: 18 January 2013 (aged 90); Edinburgh
- Citizenship: British
- Education: The London School of Economics
- Known for: Founded of the academic study of politics
- Scientific career
- Institutions: Royal Academy of Turku, University of Manchester, University of Aberdeen, Masaryk University

Frank William Bealey (31 August 1922 – 18 January 2013) was a British political scientist who was a pioneering founder of the academic study of politics and was a campaigner for democracy in Eastern Europe.

== Life ==
Born in Bilston, Bealey was educated at King Edward VI Grammar School, Stourbridge, and during World War II, he served in the Royal Navy 1941–1946, serving on several ships, including HMS Marne and HMS Tortola, experiencing Arctic Convoys on both. He survived HMS Marne's torpedoing on 12 November 1942 during Operation Torch. Bealey was de-mobbed in January 1946, entering a term late at The London School of Economics (LSE), and graduating with a First Class Honours degree in government (Political Science) in 1948.

== Academic work ==
After gaining his degree, he obtained a one-year British Council scholarship as a Finnish Government Scholar at the University of Helsinki, where he was also asked to teach temporarily at the Swedish and Finnish Universities of Abo/Turku. On his return to the United Kingdom he worked as a research assistant for the Passfield Trust through the support of the then head of Department of Government at LSE, Harold Laski. His task was to analyse the policies and ideas of Labour Party leaders, and produce a collection of documents illustrating the history of the party from its foundation in 1900 until 1950. Due to Laski's untimely death in 1950 this research was not published until much later, as The Social and Political Ideas of the British Labour Party (1970).

In 1951 to 1952 he was extra mural lecturer at the University of Manchester, thereafter moving to the University of North Staffordshire (later to become Keele University). Here he spent twelve years as assistant lecturer, lecturer and then senior lecturer in the Department of Political Institutions. Among his colleagues were notable pioneers of political science such as Samuel Finer, Hugh Berrington, Alan Angell and Jean Blondel.

In 1964, he took up the position of professor of politics (the first occupant of this chair) at the University of Aberdeen, later to become Department of Politics and International Relations, where he remained for 26 years finally retiring in 1990 and becoming emeritus professor of politics and international relations. In retirement, Bealey moved to Edinburgh, where he died on 18 January 2013.

== Achievements ==
In 1981 he became a trustee of the Jan Hus Educational Foundation set up prior to the 1989 Czechoslovak Velvet Revolution to organise clandestine seminars for dissidents, with speakers from West European Universities. He went to Czechoslovakia in the summer of 1984 (under the disguise of being a tourist) smuggling in materials and various spare parts for word processors and also to give clandestine lectures on the developments of Western political thought to dissidents, and he did this again in the spring of 1989. After the Velvet Revolution, he applied for and set up and co-ordinated an EU TEMPUS scheme (JEP 0276), which was concerned with the rehabilitation of higher education in post-Communist Europe.

== Awards and memberships ==
- Treasurer and Founder Member of the Society for the Study of Labour History.
- Convenor for Committee of Social Sciences University of Aberdeen.
- Founder Member and Member of Political Studies Association and in recognition of his outstanding contribution to UK political studies he was awarded an Academic Life Time Achievement Award at the PSA Annual Conference in Edinburgh in 2010.
- Fellow of the Royal Historical Society.
- Awarded a D.Sc. Econ (London).
