= The Europaeum =

Network of European universities

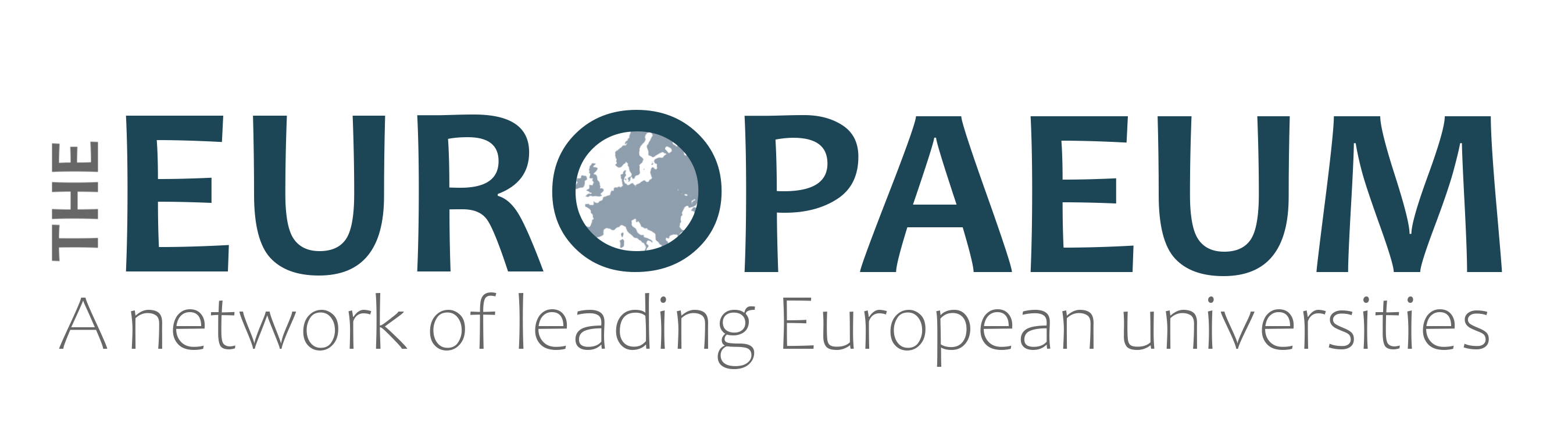
- Formation: 1992
- Location: Oxford, United Kingdom
- Members: 17: Catholic University of Portugal Central European University Charles University in Prague Complutense University of Madrid Freie Universität Berlin Graduate Institute of International and Development Studies University of Helsinki Jagiellonian University Leiden University LMU Munich Pompeu Fabra University University of Bologna University of Copenhagen University of Luxembourg University of Oxford University of St Andrews University of Tartu
- Executive Director: Anthony Teasdale
- Director of Scholars' Programme: Dr Tracey Sowerby
- Director of Core Programme: Dr Miles Pattenden
- Chief Administrator: Sasha Panagiotidis
- Main organ: Trustees, Academic Council, Executive Committee
- Website: www.europaeum.org//

The Europaeum is a network of universities in Europe, founded in 1992 by three universities: University of Bologna, Leiden University, and University of Oxford. It currently has 17 member universities operating in 15 countries. The Europaeum is based administratively at St Antony's College, Oxford.

== Current Europaeum programmes ==
The Europaeum currently offers two main programmes - its Ideas (formerly 'Core') Programme, and its Future Leaders of Europe: Europaeum Scholars' Programme - both of which are open to postgraduates studying at member universities of the network.

== Europaeum Ideas Programme ==
The Ideas Programme operates through up to ten short (two to three day) in-person seminars a year, open to both Master's and doctoral students from member universities, which explore a range of multi-disciplinary issues relating to 'The Making and Shaping of Europe' and 'Europe: Past, Present and Future'. It has four seasonal schools - a winter, spring, summer and autumn school - and other events on recurrent or ad hoc themes. These seminars rotate around member universities across Europe. Students who are admitted - usually between 12 and 35 in number for any event - have their travel, accommodation and meals covered by the Europaeum. About 175 postgraduates participate in Europaeum Ideas Programme events each year.

The four seasonal schools on the Ideas Programme each year cover the following broad themes:

- a Europaeum Winter School on aspects of the European economy, society, the environment and/or digital transformation;
- a Europaeum Spring School on the place of Europe in the wider world, including foreign affairs, trade, development, and/or security and defence;
- a Europaeum Summer School on aspects of European culture, including literature and the arts;
- a Europaeum Autumn School on EU politics, institutions and policy-making. This event is always organised in Brussels.

In parallel, the Europaeum organises two to four in-person seminars each year in one of the following forms: a Classics Colloquium; a History Seminar; a Leadership Challenge; a Futures Forum; a Popular Culture Forum; and/or a Technology Seminar. In addition, the Europaeum participates in two events organised by one of its member universities, the Catholic University of Portugal (UCP) - namely the UCP communications winter workshop, held in Lisbon each January, and the UCP political forum, held in Estoril each June.

== Future Leaders of Europe: Europaeum Scholars' Programme ==
The Europaeum's flagship programme, which has completed its fourth two-year cycle (2018-25), is its Future Leaders of Europe: Europaeum Scholars’ Programme.

== History ==
In the aftermath of the Fall of the Berlin Wall in 1989, the Europaeum was conceived by George Weidenfeld, Ronald Grierson and Roy Jenkins, who had recently become Chancellor of the University of Oxford, as a vehicle for promoting the ‘advancement of education through the encouragement of European studies in the University of Oxford and other European institutions of higher education having links with Oxford’.

The Europaeum was formally launched as an international network in 1992 by three major universities - Oxford, Leiden University and Bologna University - expanding in turn to include Bonn, which joined in 1996 and left in 2013), Paris I (Panthéon-Sorbonne), which joined in 1997 and left in 2023, and the Geneva Graduate Institute of International and Development Studies, which joined in 1998.

In the early 2000s, the Europaeum became a UK charity and not-for-profit company limited by guarantee. A new governance structure was established, with a Europaeum Council, an Academic Committee and a Management Committee, which broadly correspond to the respective governing bodies today. Dr Paul Flather was appointed as Secretary General and the organisation moved from the university's offices to those of the Voltaire Foundation in Oxford. An MA in European Politics, Culture, History and Institutions - linking Bologna, Leiden and Oxford - was run as a pilot project.

The network continued to expand to include Charles University in Prague, which joined in 2001, Complutense University of Madrid in 2003, Helsinki University in 2004, and the Jagiellonian University in Kraków in 2005, reaching its then target of 10 members. In 2004-05, Oxford, Paris and Leiden launched a new jointly-offered Europaeum MA in European History and Civilisation (EHC). Following the death of Roy Jenkins in 2003, a memorial fund was set up to raise funds for European scholarships, which ran from 2004 to 2017.

A Board of Trustees was established in 2009-10 to take over the supervisory duties from the Europaeum Council, supported by an Academic Council, representing the member universities. Pompeu Fabra University in Barcelona joined the network in 2012, followed by LMU Munich in Munich in 2015.

A new joint academic programme was launched in 2012 by the Universities of Prague, Leiden and Paris, around the theme of European Politics and Society (EPS), with graduates spending their second year of study (of a two-year graduate programme) at a partner institution. The programme was named in honour of the late President of the Czech Republic and human rights activist, Václav Havel.

Since 2016, Dr Andrew Graham, who had chaired the Academic Council, has led a substantial reformatting of the Europaeum, which has involved notably the creation and launch a Europaeum Scholars' Programme (see above) and the initiation of an alumni programme. The Europaeum moved its offices to St Antony's College, Oxford in 2018.

Membership of the network has since grown from 11 universities in 2016 to 17 in 2025. The new universities joining have been St Andrews University and the University of Luxembourg in 2017; the Catholic University of Portugal in Lisbon, Copenhagen University and the Free University of Berlin in 2019; and Tartu University in 2021. KU Leuven joined in 2019 and left in 2024. The Central European University (located in Vienna and Budapest) initially became an associate member and has been a full member of the network since 2023.

== Joint Master's programmes ==
MA in European Politics and Society (EPS): This is a two-year programme, partly financed by the EU Erasmus Mundus scheme.

MA in European History and Civilization (EHC): This one-year Master's degree in European History and Civilisation ran from 2004 to 2024. The participating universities were Leiden University, University of Paris I Pantheon-Sorbonne and University of Oxford. The final degree was awarded by Leiden University. Students taking part spent one term in each university.

Václav Havel Europaeum MA programme (EMAP): Named after Václav Havel, the late Czech dissident and President and starting in 2012, this two-year Master's programme in European Society and Politics was organised by Leiden University, University of Paris I Pantheon-Sorbonne and Charles University in Prague within a Europaeum framework. The final degree was awarded by each student's home university.

== Member universities ==
The Europaeum currently has 17 members universities located in 15 countries.

(This listing still has to be updated to include the University of Padua joining in 2026 and Complutense University in Madrid leaving for 2026 at least because of the latter's current financial difficulties).

Europaeum member universities
Country	Location	University	Abbreviation
Austria	Vienna	Central European University	CEU
Czech Republic	Prague	Charles University	Charles/Prague
Denmark	Copenhagen	University of Copenhagen	Copenhagen
Finland	Helsinki	University of Helsinki	Helsinki
Germany	Munich	LMU Munich	Munich
Germany	Berlin	Free University of Berlin	FU Berlin
Italy	Bologna	University of Bologna	Bologna
Netherlands	Leiden	Leiden University	Leiden
Luxembourg	Luxembourg	University of Luxembourg	Luxembourg
Poland	Kraków	Jagiellonian University	Jagiellonian/Kraków
Portugal	Lisbon	Catholic University of Portugal	Católica
Spain	Barcelona	Pompeu Fabra University	Pompeu Fabra
Spain	Madrid	Complutense University of Madrid	Complutense/Madrid
Switzerland	Geneva	Geneva Graduate Institute	IHEID
United Kingdom	Oxford	University of Oxford	Oxford
United Kingdom	St Andrews	University of St Andrews	St Andrews
Estonia	Tartu	University of Tartu	Tartu

== Map ==
Locations of Europaeum member universities
