= Douglas Blackwood =

RAF officer (1909–1997)

George Douglas Morant Blackwood
- Born: George Douglas Morant Blackwood; 11 October 1909; UK
- Died: 2 March 1997 (aged 87); Edinburgh, Scotland
- Military career
- Allegiance: United Kingdom
- Branch: Royal Air Force
- Service years: 1939 – 1945
- Rank: Wing commander
- Conflicts: World War II: Battle of Britain
- Awards: Czech War Cross; Czech Military Medal; Czech Medal of George of Poděbrady
- Other work: Publishing

George Douglas Morant Blackwood (11 October 1909 – 2 March 1997) was a British publisher and a fighter pilot in the Royal Air Force during World War II.

== Early life ==
Douglas Blackwood was a great-great-grandson of William Blackwood who founded William Blackwood & Sons the publishers and Blackwood's Magazine. He was educated at St Cyprian's School, Eastbourne and Eton. On completing his education, he had little choice but to follow his father into the family firm. However he held a short service commission in the RAF from 1932 to 1938. Had had it not been for the outbreak of World War II, he would have returned to Edinburgh to work for his father and uncle.

== RAF service ==
He rejoined the RAF in 1939 and, being a naturally gifted fighter pilot, commanded No. 310 Squadron RAF, a Czech fighter squadron during the Battle of Britain. In August 1940, during the Battle of Britain, he was forced to bail out over Clacton. After a night of German bombing of the City of London, he was on dawn patrol and from his plane at 25,000 feet over the North Weald he could see the thick smoke from the fires which destroyed Blackwood's business premises in Paternoster Square. He ended the Second World War as wing commander commanding the Czech Fighter Wing in the RAF Second Tactical Air Force. He was decorated with the Czech War Cross and the Czech Military Medal, and was presented with the Czech Medal of George of Poděbrady in 1993.

== Publishing ==
Blackwood left the RAF in 1945 and found the publishing business to be in a shocking state. The Blitz had destroyed millions of books as well as Blackwood's base in London and heralded a decline in the firm's fortunes.

Before the war, William Blackwood & Sons had been one of Britain's leading literary publishers, but in the post-war world its name and literary reputation counted for little. Blackwood was managing director of the firm and editor of Blackwood's Magazine from 1948 to 1976. Blackwoods had to deal with an increasing number of mass-production rivals and with a decline in interest in monthly literary magazines. By the 1970s, Blackwoods and its magazine appeared out-of-date and failed to attract a younger generation of writers and readers. It was an achievement that the magazine survived until 1980. He retired from the editorship in 1976, being the last member of his family to edit the magazine which bore his name. He remained chairman of the publishing house until 1983.

His biographer, Trevor Royle, noted that Blackwood, being shy, could appear remote or aloof, although he was considered "a kindly man who wore his learning lightly". He was most comfortable in military company and never courted literary or political society. He had little literary pretension – when a reviewer asked if he had known George Orwell at Eton – he was six years his junior there and at St Cyprian's – Blackwood replied, "Oh, Blair, yes I remember him, he had a motor-bicycle." However, Blackwood's dismissive comment may have a different interpretation as he published an article in his magazine that vigorously refuted Orwell's criticisms of their prep school.

== Family ==
Blackwood married Phyllis Caulcutt, an equestrian rider and an expert exponent of dressage, in 1936 and they had a son and daughter. His son Michael, a former naval pilot, succeeded him in the business but by then the firm had amalgamated to concentrate on printing.
