= John Vaughan Wilkes =

English educationalist and Anglican priest

John Comyn Vaughan Wilkes (30 March 1902 – 24 January 1986) was an English educationalist, who was Warden of Radley College and an Anglican priest.

Wilkes was born in Eastbourne, the eldest son of Lewis Chitty Vaughan Wilkes and his wife Cicely Ellen Philadelphia Comyn. His parents were the proprietors of St Cyprian's School which they had established in 1899. Wilkes was educated at Fonthill East Grinstead, St Cyprians and Eton College, where he was a King's Scholar. George Orwell and Cyril Connolly followed him to Eton as scholars from his parents' school. Wilkes won a classical scholarship to Trinity College, Oxford. At Oxford, he won a half blue for golf and played in the University Golf Match against Cambridge in 1924 and 1925.

In 1925, Wilkes became an assistant master at Eton and from 1930 to 1937 he was Master in College (or housemaster for the King's Scholars) there. In 1937 he became Warden of Radley College, and after the outbreak of World War II he helped arrange for Eastbourne College to be evacuated to Radley from the south coast. In spite of overcrowding, the two schools drew together harmoniously.

Wilkes pushed the school forward and was an ardent believer in the duty of public schools to share their benefits with others less fortunate. While at Radley, he took Holy Orders becoming Deacon in 1945 and Priest in 1946. He led the school in the centenary celebration in 1947, and left Radley in 1954 to become a practising clergyman. He was Vicar of Hunslet, Leeds from 1954 until 1958 where he was concerned with social issues in deprived areas. He was then Vicar of Marlow until 1965. From 1965 to 1967 he was Rector of Preston Bisset, and then Rector of Great Kimble. In 1974 he was recommended for appointment as Bishop of Peterborough, but turned down the offer. He retired in 1977, and went to live in Hereford where he died aged 84.

Wilkes married Joan Alington, a daughter of Cyril Alington in 1940. Her father was headmaster of Eton and Dean of Durham, and her sisters married Sir Alec Douglas-Home, later Prime Minister, and Roger Mynors, who were both Wilkes' contemporaries at Eton. Wilkes' sister Rosemary married cricketer William Tomlinson who became headmaster of St Cyprians. John and Joan Wilkes' daughter Kathy Wilkes was a philosopher and active campaigner for academic freedom in Soviet Eastern Europe.
