= Michaela Marksová =

Czech politician

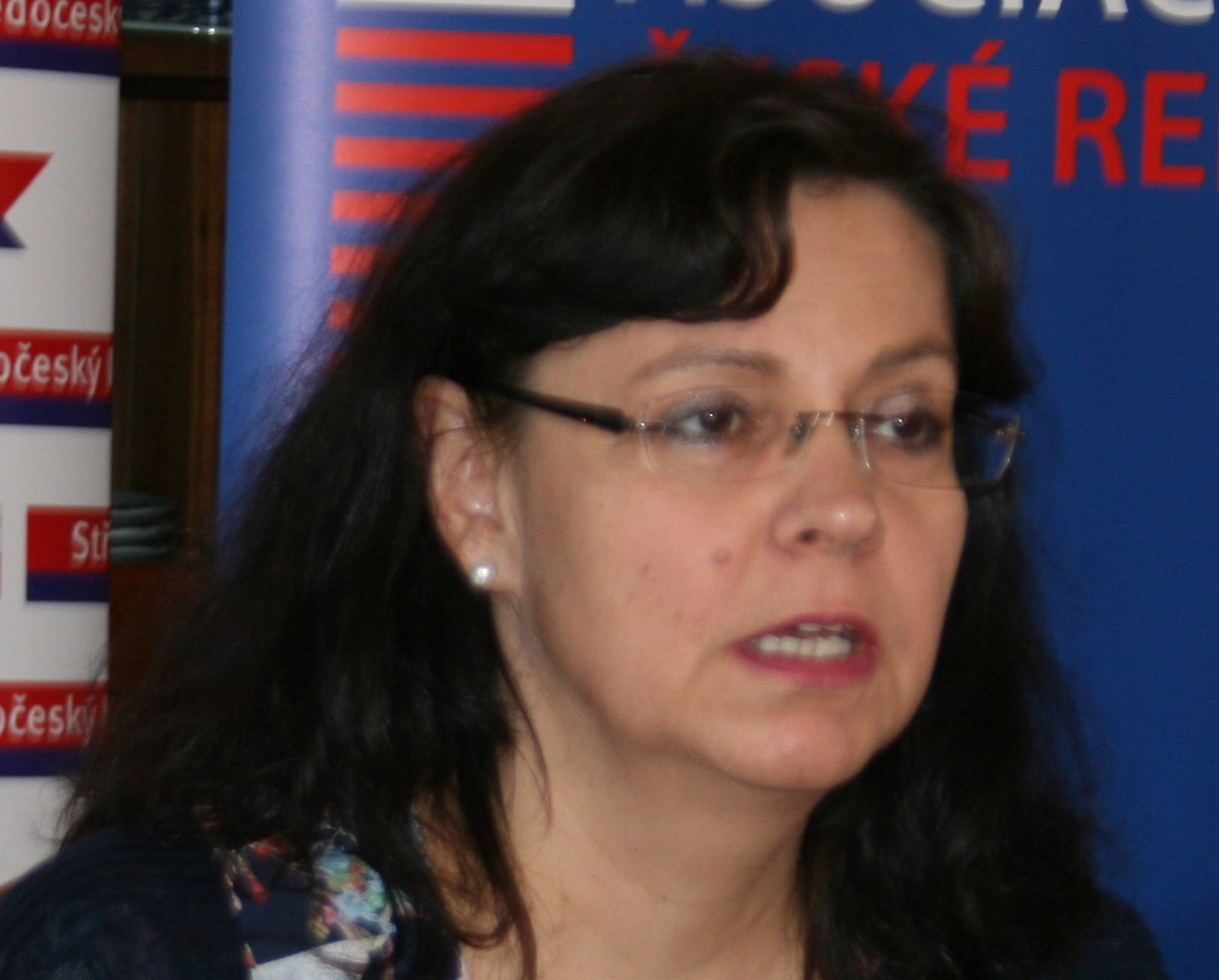

Minister of Labour and Social Affairs
- In office 29 January 2014 – 13 December 2017
- Prime Minister: Bohuslav Sobotka
- Preceded by: František Koníček
- Succeeded by: Jaroslava Němcová

Personal details
- Born: 20 March 1969 (age 57) Prague, Czechoslovakia
- Party: ČSSD (since 1997)
- Spouse: Arnošt Marks
- Education: Charles University

Michaela Marksová (born Michaela Tominová 20 March 1969) is a Czech politician. From January 2014, she was the Czech Minister of Labour and Social Affairs in the government of Bohuslav Sobotka, and the spokesperson on human rights and families, leaving the posts in December 2017 following legislative elections. Since 2006, she has been a council member for the Czech Social Democratic Party in the Prague 2 district council.

She is a niece of the philosopher Julius Tomin and Zdenka Tomin, former Charter 77 speaker.
