= St Cyprian's School =

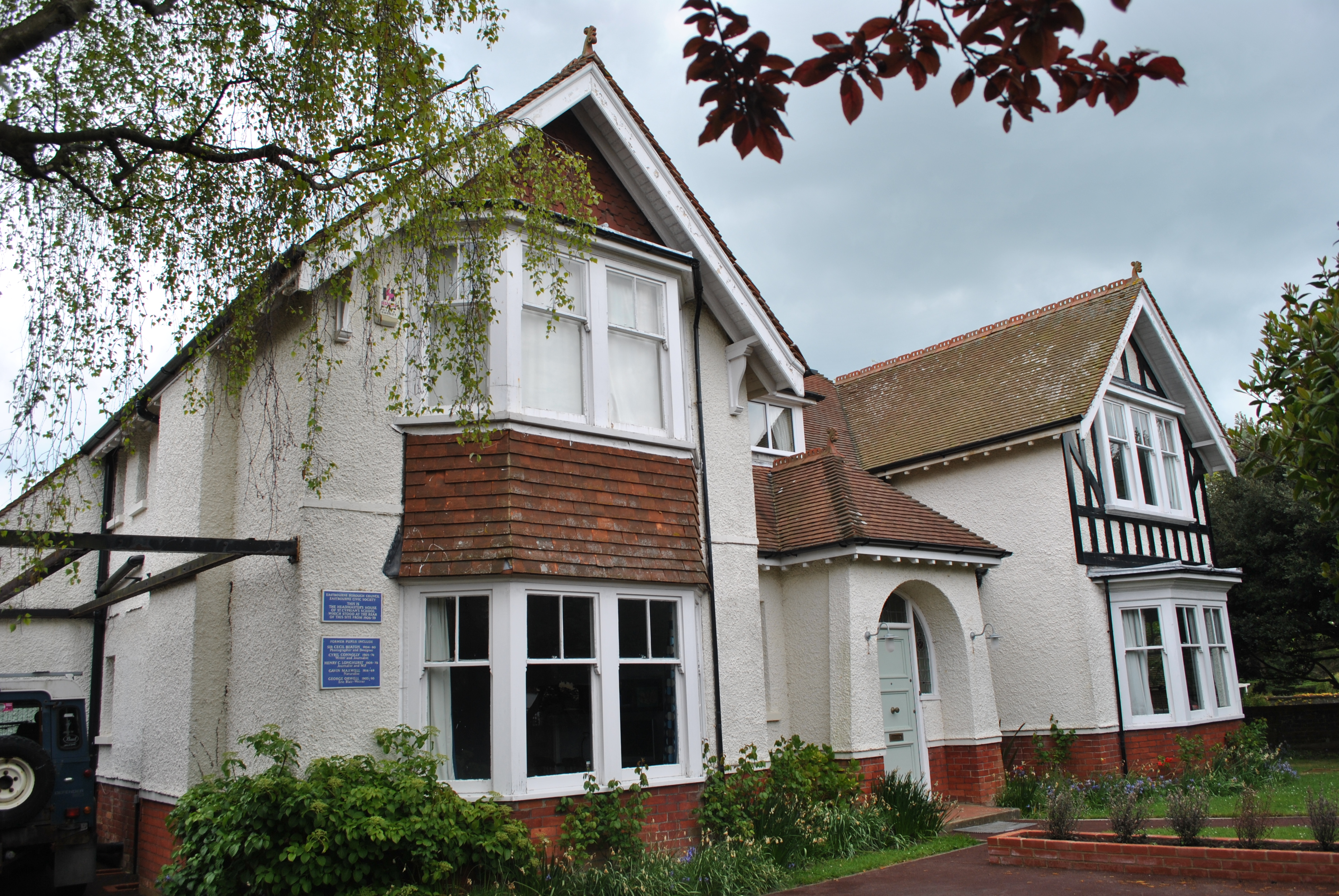

Location
- Eastbourne, Sussex; England; 50.7685°N 0.2641°E

Information
- Type: Preparatory School; Boarding school
- Motto: Forsan et haec olim meminisse juvabit. (Note: (Latin) from Virgil, Aeneid: Book 1; Line 203. "Some day, perhaps, remembering even this will be a pleasure" (tr. Robert Fitzgerald))
- Established: 1899
- Founder: L.C. Vaughan Wilkes
- Closed: 1943
- Gender: M
- Age: 4 to 14
- Enrolment: c. 90
- Colours: Green, pale blue, black
- Publication: St Cyprian's Chronicle

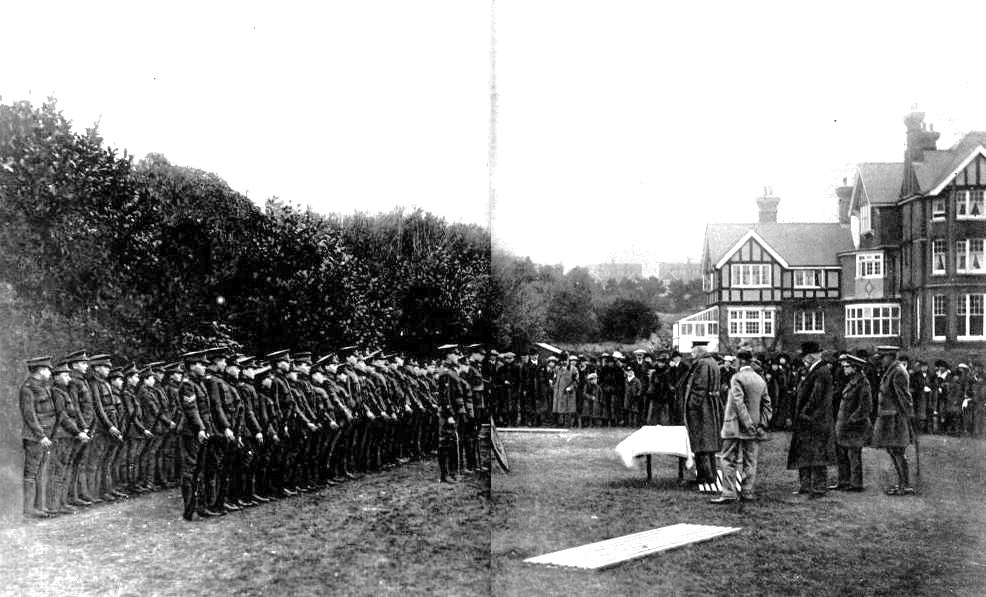
General Cheylesmore addresses the school's Cadet Corps after they won the Imperial Challenge Shield in 1917

St Cyprian's School was an English preparatory school for boys, which operated in the early 20th century in Eastbourne, East Sussex. Like other preparatory schools, its purpose was to train pupils to do well enough in the examinations (usually taken around the age of 13) to gain admission to leading public schools, and to provide an introduction to boarding school life.

== History ==
St Cyprian's was founded in 1899 by Lewis Vaughan Wilkes and his wife Cicely Comyn, a newly married couple in their twenties. It originally operated in a large house in Carlisle Road, but by 1906 had grown sufficiently to move into new purpose-built facilities with extensive playing fields behind Summerdown Road. The school ran with the prevailing ethos of Muscular Christianity which had typified private education since the time of Thomas Arnold of Rugby, and placed much emphasis on developing self-reliance and integrity ("Character"). In these and many other respects St Cyprian's was little different from the other leading prep schools of the time. The school submitted itself annually to an independent academic assessment, conducted by Sir Charles Grant Robertson fellow of All Souls College, Oxford. The school uniform was a green shirt with a pale blue collar, corduroy breeches and a cap with a Maltese Cross for a badge.

The high success rate in achieving scholarships to leading public schools including Eton and Harrow attracted ambitious parents. However, the Wilkeses appreciated that public school scholarships were really intended for talented children from less well-off families, and so they provided places at St Cyprian's at significantly reduced fees for deserving cases, in the hope that they would attain these scholarships. Two further features distinguished St Cyprian's. The first was the proximity to South Downs, which was fully exploited to give opportunities to the boys for running wild, studying natural history, walking, picnics, riding and even golf on the adjacent links. The second was the overwhelming impact of Mrs Wilkes (known as "Mum"). She was in total control of the school and in the days before female emancipation this made a great impression on her charges. The resulting ambivalence was exacerbated by a fiery temper and by the way her mood flipped between firm discipline and generous indulgence. Mrs Wilkes was a great believer in history teaching and saw the Harrow History Prize as an opportunity to bring it into the classics-dominated curriculum. Mrs Wilkes also taught English, and stimulated generations of writers with her emphasis on clear, high quality writing. In addition to Mrs Wilkes, a major influence was the second master R. L. Sillar, who joined the school staff soon after it opened and stayed for 30 years. With his interest in natural history, his skill at shooting, his art teaching and his magic lantern shows he broadened the curriculum considerably and is revered in Old Boy's accounts.

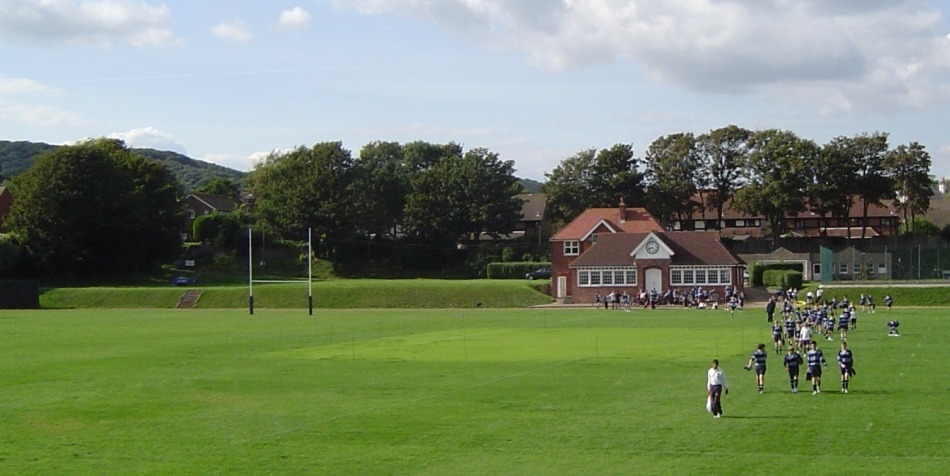
The St Cyprian's playing fields, now used by Eastbourne College. The main school building was on the high ground on the left. Only the swimming pool building remains (centre)

In its fortieth year, the school building was gutted by fire on 14 May 1939, and a housemaid died in a fall from an upper window. Emergency accommodation was arranged at Ascham St. Vincent's School, the buildings of a preparatory school in Eastbourne which had recently closed. On 20 July 1939, St Cyprian's moved to Whispers, near Midhurst in West Sussex. It stayed there for 18 months until the building was requisitioned by the army during World War II. As a result of this double blow, numbers dwindled and after a brief combination with Rosehill School in Gloucestershire the remaining boys went with the then-headmaster, W. J. V. Tomlinson (Bill), to join the old rival Summer Fields School, in Oxford. The school playing fields were sold to Eastbourne College.

In April 1997, Eastbourne Civic Society (now The Eastbourne Society), in conjunction with the County Borough of Eastbourne, erected a blue plaque at the house in Summerdown Road which was connected with the school and which was Mrs Wilkes's residence in later years.

== Former pupils ==
The school was attended, among others, by:

- Sir Cecil Beaton (1904–1980) – photographer, stage designer
- Douglas Blackwood (1909–1997) – Battle of Britain fighter pilot, publisher
- Derwent Hall Caine (1891–1971) – actor, publisher and Labour politician
- Walter John Christie (1905–1982) – British India civil servant
- Alan Clark (1928–1999) – military historian, Conservative politician and diarist
- Cyril Connolly (1903–1974) – literary critic and writer
- John Edmondson, 2nd Baron Sandford (1920–2009) – naval commander, clergyman, politician (Sandford Principle)
- John D. Eshelby (1916–1981) – scientist in micromechanics ("Eshelby's Inclusion")
- Henry R. B. Foote, VC (1904–1993) – major-general; awarded the Victoria Cross for World War II service in North Africa
- Ian Fraser, Baron Fraser of Lonsdale (1897–1974) – World War I veteran, who lost his eyesight at the Somme; Chairman of St Dunstan's Charity; MP; BBC governor; first life peer
- Dyneley Hussey (1893–1972) – war poet, music critic
- Alan Hyman (1910–1999) – author, journalist and screenwriter
- Alaric Jacob (1909–1995) – journalist, writer
- David Kindersley (1915–1995) – stonecutter, letterer, typographer
- Henry Longhurst (1909–1978) – MP, golfer, golf correspondent
- Rupert Lonsdale (1905–1999) – World War II submarine commander/POW, Anglican clergyman
- Seymour de Lotbiniere (1905–1984) – BBC director of outside broadcasting who initiated Test match commentary and masterminded the televising of the 1953 Coronation
- Patrick de Maré (1916–2008) – British Army psychiatrist; consultant psychotherapist who specialized in group psychotherapy
- John Marsden (1915–2004) – British intelligence officer, Eton schoolmaster and sculler
- Gavin Maxwell (1914–1969) – naturalist, writer
- E. H. W. Meyerstein (1889–1952) – writer, scholar
- Anthony Mildmay (1909–1950) – amateur steeplechase jockey who rode in the Grand National
- Russi Mody (1918–2014) – Indian businessman
- Sir Cedric Morris Bt. (1889–1982) – artist, horticulturalist
- Jagaddipendra Narayan (1915–1970) – Maharaja of Cooch Behar
- Sir Hugh Norman-Walker (1916–1985) – Colonial Office official whose posts included Governor of the Seychelles and Colonial Secretary of Hong Kong
- Toby O'Brien (1909–1979) – public relations expert who led Britain's efforts to counter Nazi Germany's propaganda
- David Ogilvy (1911–1999) – advertising executive – known as the "Father of Advertising"
- Sir David Ormsby-Gore, KCMG (1918–1985) – politician; British ambassador to the USA
- George Orwell (né Eric Blair) (1903–1950) – writer, journalist, Spanish Civil War loyalist, author of Nineteen Eighty-Four
- Kenneth Payne (1912–1988) – Olympic rower
- Alec Pearce (1910–1982) – cricketer for Kent CCC, MCC and Hong Kong
- Geoffrey Pidcock (1897–1976) – World War I RAF ace
- H. Q. A. Reeves (1909–1955) – engineer (Welrod secret weapon)
- Charles Rivett-Carnac (1901–1980) – Commissioner, Royal Canadian Mounted Police (RCMP)
- Robert de Ropp (1913–1987) – biochemist, cancer research, writer on spiritual enlightenment
- James Collingwood Tinling (1900–1983) – RAF officer, who co-built the first jet engine
- Sir Charles Hyde Villiers (1912–1992) – businessman; one-time chairman of British Steel
- Sir Lashmer Whistler (1898–1963) – general in British Army at El Alamein, Normandy landings and Operation Market Garden
- John Vaughan Wilkes (1902–1986) – warden of Radley College and clergyman
- Richard Wood, MP (1920–2002) – Conservative politician and minister
- Philip Ziegler (1929–2023) – historian

== Former teachers ==
- Charles Edgar Loseby – National Democratic and Labour Party MP

== Accounts and recollections ==
The school's three most prominent writers included accounts of the school in their works. Connolly recalled his time at St Cyprian's in Enemies of Promise, published in 1938 with the name of the school disguised as "St. Wulfric's". With wry humour, he mocked the Wilkes and the ethos of "Character building", writing "We called the headmistress Flip and the headmaster Sambo. Flip, around whom the whole system revolved, was able, ambitious, temperamental and energetic." Connolly questioned the practice of British parents sending young children to boarding preparatory schools but concluded "Yet St [Cyprian's] where I now went was a well run and vigorous example which did me a world of good."

His friend, George Orwell, disagreed and wrote disparagingly and bitterly of the school in the quasi-autobiographical essay Such, Such Were the Joys, first published in the Partisan Review (Sept.- Oct. 1952). By Orwell's own admission this was too libelous to print and under British libel laws could not be published while the people described in it were still living. It appeared in print in the United States in 1952 with the name of the school changed to "Crossgates", but not in the United Kingdom until after the death of Mrs. Wilkes in 1967. The thrust of Orwell's criticism was directed at the system of boarding school education that sent children away from their homes when they were no more than 7 or 8 years old, and at the unreflective elitism and classism of Britain before the First World War. This is evident from one of the closing passages of Orwell's essay.

How would St Cyprian's appear to me now, if I could go back, at my present age, and see it as it was in 1915? What should I think of Sambo and Flip, those terrible, all-powerful monsters? I should see them as a couple of silly, shallow, ineffectual people, eagerly clambering up a social ladder which any thinking person could see to be on the point of collapse.

Orwell attacked the presence of "nouveaux riches" and aristocrats at the school, who he thought received preferential treatment. In contrast, Gavin Maxwell's parents had chosen the school because it was less elitist and aristocratic than older prep schools. Maxwell found the school tough, but left primarily because he felt he was the target of resentment because of his aristocratic parents with their Scottish estates. Longhurst, who had great admiration for the school and for Mrs. Wilkes, described these authors' accounts of the school as unrecognizable, and would frequently defend "a very fine school" in response to reviewers of Orwell's work. His views were shared by W J L Christie, Indian Civil Service, who wrote a riposte to Orwell in defence of the school in Blackwood's Magazine (owned and edited by Douglas Blackwood). Both were particularly incensed by what in their opinion were totally inaccurate accusations against the Wilkeses.

Cecil Beaton, who was at the school with Orwell, had a different reaction, describing the work as "Hilariously funny – but exaggerated". Orwell's essay has been dissected in detail and its reliability questioned by Pearce.

Nearly all accounts of former pupils declare that the school gave them a good start in life but views of Mrs. Wilkes vary. David Ogilvy is critical, but Alaric Jacob praises her teaching, and Foote, Rivett-Carnac, and Wright refer to her with great affection. It was Connolly who, after reading his parents' papers, wrote apologetically: "The Wilkes were true friends and I had caricatured their mannerisms ... and read mercenary motives into much that was just enthusiasm" and he described Mrs. Wilkes as "a warm-hearted and inspired teacher".

Walter Christie's cap and other items are currently displayed at the Chalk Farm Hotel in Willingdon.

== See also ==
- Kathy Wilkes
- Paget Wilkes
