= HMS Marne =

Two ships of the Royal Navy have borne the name HMS Marne, after the river Marne in France, site of the First Battle of the Marne in 1914:

- HMS Marne (1915) was an Admiralty M-class destroyer launched in 1915 and sold in 1921.
- HMS Marne (G35) was an M-class destroyer launched in 1940. She was sold to the Turkish Navy in 1958 and renamed Mareşal Fevzi Çakmak. She was discarded in 1970.
