= Flather Hall =

Coordinates: 38.938751°N 76.998462°W

Flather Hall is a dormitory and one of 10 housing options for students at the Catholic University of America. Named for Mary Flather, it was constructed in 1962 and renovated in 2008. On the first floor is a priest in residence and a chapel. It has solar panels on the roof, making it part of the largest solar energy system in the Washington, D.C. metro area. Formerly used as a freshman men's dorm, Flather Hall now houses freshman women as of the 2022-23 school year.
