= Gary Flather =

English barrister and judge (1937–2017)

Gerald "Gary" Denis Flather, QC, OBE, (4 October 1937 – 9 October 2017) was an English barrister, judge and disability rights campaigner.

== Biography ==
Flather was the son of Denis Gerald Flather, group managing director of the family steel company based in Sheffield, and Joan Ada (née Walker).

He was educated at Oundle School and Pembroke College, Oxford. He sat for ten years as a deputy High Court judge, and for 27 years as a recorder. He founded the Bar Council Disability Committee, amongst other things campaigning for improved access in courts and for disabled students' rights.

== Personal life ==
Flather married Shreela Rai, a politician, daughter of Rai Bahadur Aftab Rai, of New Delhi, India, a barrister and diplomat. Flather fought multiple sclerosis for forty years, necessitating the use of a wheelchair. Flather was appointed an Officer of the Order of the British Empire (OBE) in the 1999 New Year Honours "for services to the Legal Profession and to promoting Disability Awareness."
