= Julius Tomin =

Czech philosopher (born 1938)

- Born: 2 December 1938 (age 87); Prague, Czechoslovakia (now the Czech Republic)
- Education: PhD, philosophy, 1965
- Alma mater: Charles University in Prague
- Known for: Underground seminars, Jan Hus Educational Foundation
- Spouse(s): Zdena Holubova (m. 1962) Doina Cornell (m. 1999)
- Children: Three sons, one daughter
- Relatives: Michaela Marksová-Tominová (niece)
- Website: www.juliustomin.org

Julius Tomin (born 2 December 1938) is a Czech philosopher. He became known in the 1970s and 1980s for his involvement with the Jan Hus Educational Foundation, which ran an underground education network in the former Czechoslovakia, offering seminars in philosophy in people's homes.

== Early life and education ==
Tomin studied English and Russian in Czechoslovakia. Agreeing with Tolstoy's and Gandhi's views on non-violence, he refused to do military service, for which he served a prison sentence. Subsequently, he attempted to depart the country for Sweden but was apprehended, resulting in an additional year of service. Upon his release, he secured a position as a forester and later worked as a ward assistant in a psychiatric hospital. It was there that he met his first wife, a therapist, and they married in 1962.

Interested in philosophy, Tomin wrote to Milan Machovec of Charles University, Prague, who arranged for him to register for a doctorate. He obtained his PhD and worked as a junior fellow in the university's philosophy department from 1966 to 1970.

== Teaching and activism ==
In 1969–1970 Tomin was a visiting professor at the University of Hawaiʻi at Mānoa. Barbara Day writes that he was refused an academic position when he returned to Czechoslovakia, after associating himself with the reform Communists. He worked instead as a turbine operator, but according to Day he was sacked when he was discovered teaching philosophy to his colleagues. He then worked as a nightwatchman in a zoo.

In December 1976, he became a signatory to Charter 77, which made him a further target of suspicion. The following year, he began holding philosophy seminars in his apartment. After asking for academic support for his seminars in 1978 from universities in England, Germany, and the United States, philosophers from the University of Oxford set up the Jan Hus Educational Foundation to help send books and speakers. Several of the philosophers who attended these home seminars, including Jacques Derrida, were detained by the police and asked to leave the country.

Tomin travelled with his family to the United Kingdom in August 1980, with the help of Kathy Wilkes, an Oxford philosopher, after receiving permission to study abroad. In May 1981 his Czech passport was removed by the Czech Embassy in London, and he was told that he and his wife no longer had Czech citizenship. As of 2011 he was still a British resident.

His niece is Michaela Marksová-Tominová, former minister of Labour and Social Affairs of the Czech Republic.

== Selected works ==
- "Inside the Security State," New Statesman, 7 March 1980.
- "Socratic Midwifery", The Classical Quarterly, 37(1), 1987. JSTOR 639347
