= Zdena Tominová =

Czech novelist (1941–2020)

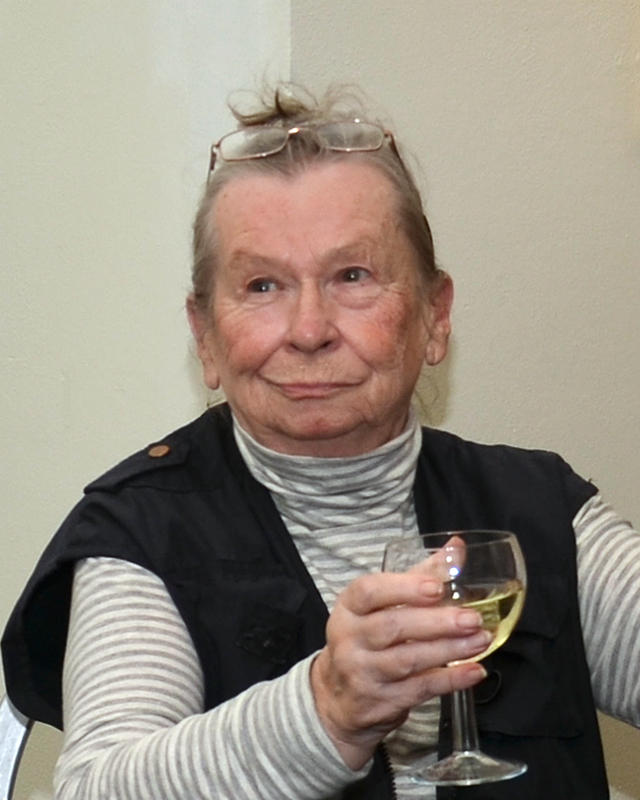
Zdena Tominová, 2017

Zdena Tominová (7 February 1941 – 24 May 2020) was a Czech novelist and a dissident in the communist era of Czechoslovakia.

== Biography ==
She was born Zdena Holubová in 1941 in Prague. She studied philosophy and sociology at university. She started her literary career in 1959, writing surrealist poetry. In 1962, she married the philosopher Julius Tomin. She published essays and short stories in the sixties. After the fall of Alexander Dubček, her writings were banned for life by the communist regime.

She was one of the spokespersons for Charter 77, which resulted in intense official harassment. She wrote for the samizdat publication Padlock. In 1980, she and her husband travelled to Oxford. They were declared "enemies of the state" by the Czechoslovak government and their citizenship was revoked. They eventually settled in Britain.

Writing as Zdena Tomin, Tominová published two novels, Stalin's Shoe (1986) and The Coast of Bohemia (1987). Both were well received by reviewers. She also wrote the screenplay for an autobiographical drama called Enemies of the State, which was first broadcast by Granada Television in 1981. The role of Zdena was played by Zoë Wanamaker. The drama was also broadcast in the US in 1988.

Zdena Tominová lived in the UK. She had two sons. One of them, the budding writer Lukáš Tomin (1963-1995) moved back to Prague in 1991 and died there at the Divoká Šárka nature reserve in 1995. Her other son Marek is a journalist and translator, also based in Prague. Her niece is Michaela Marksová, former minister of Labour and Social Affairs of the Czech Republic.
