= Shreela Flather, Baroness Flather =

British politician (1934–2024)

The Right Honourable The Baroness Flather DL
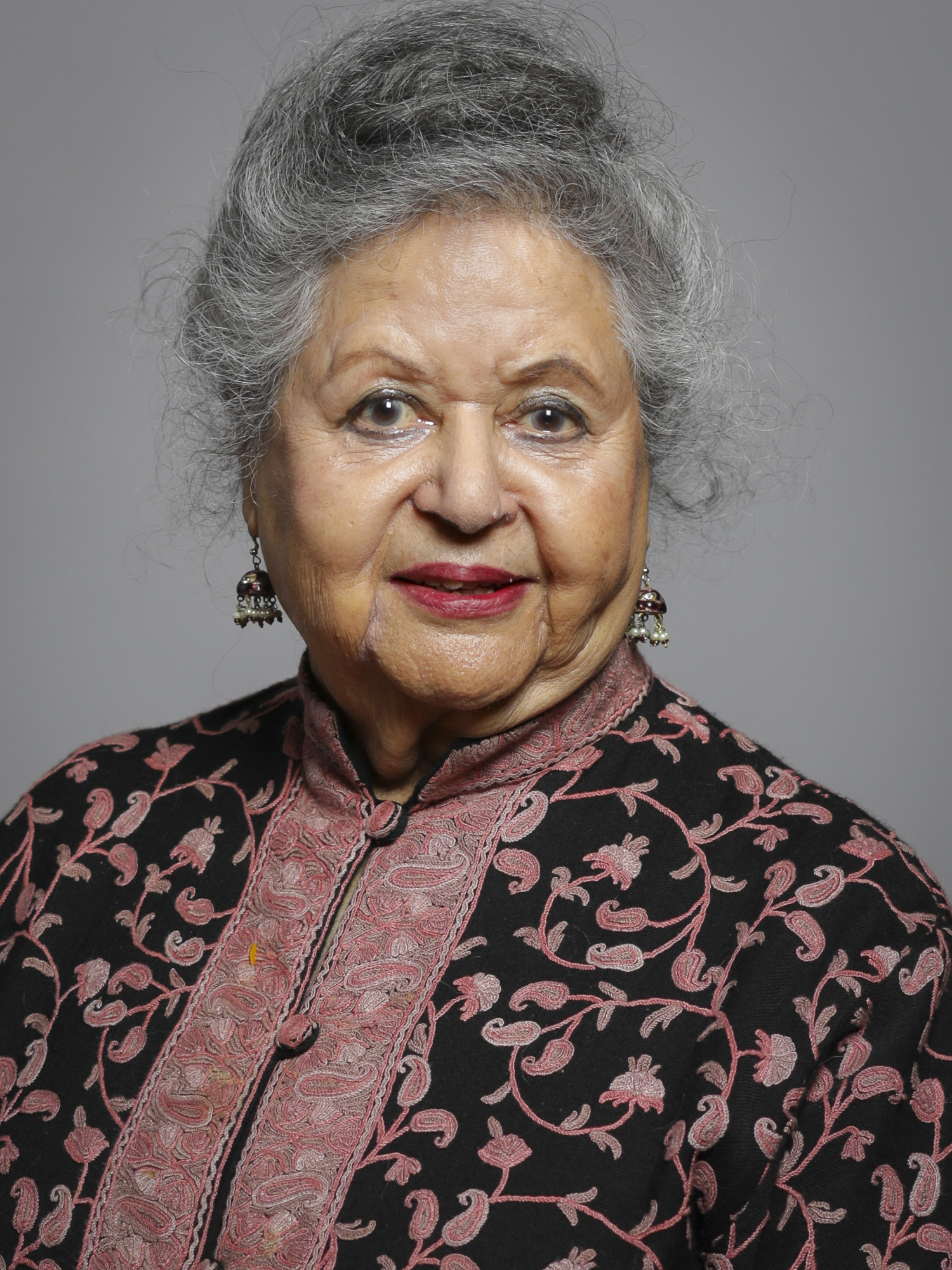
- Official portrait, 2019

Member of the House of Lords
- Lord Temporal
- Life peerage 11 June 1990 – 6 February 2024

Personal details
- Born: Shreela Rai; 13 February 1934
- Died: 6 February 2024 (aged 89)
- Party: Crossbencher (formerly Conservative)
- Spouse: Gary Flather (died 2017)
- Children: Paul Flather
- Profession: Teacher

Shreela Flather, Baroness Flather, DL (née Rai; 13 February 1934 – 6 February 2024) was a British politician, teacher and life peer.

== Politics ==
Flather served as a Councillor from 1976 to 1991; as Deputy Mayor and as Mayor for the Royal Borough of Windsor and Maidenhead; and as a Justice of the peace from 1971 to 1990. She became a life peer for the Conservative party on 11 June 1990 as Baroness Flather, of Windsor and Maidenhead in the Royal County of Berkshire. She was the first Asian woman to receive a peerage. In 1998 she resigned as the Conservative whip over the demotion of Viscount Cranborne for his actions to reduce the impact of the 1999 House of Lords Act. She rejoined the party in 1999, but left a second time in 2008, after which point she sat as a crossbencher.

Flather attended University College London.

Flather was also at one time a teacher of English as a second language and a member of the Conservative Women's National Committee. Flather was recognised as Asian of the Year 1996. She had served senior posts in various organisations involved in refugee, community, race relations and prison work. She was also shortlisted for the Grassroot Diplomat Initiative Award in 2015 for her outspoken work on women's rights, and she remains in the directory of the Grassroot Diplomat Who's Who publication.

As a member of the House of Lords, she gained attention for wearing a sari and for being among the first ethnic minorities in the house.

Flather was a distinguished supporter of Humanists UK and an honorary associate of the National Secular Society. She was one of the Vice Chairs of the All-Party Parliamentary Humanist Group. She lived in Maidenhead.

Flather was patron of the UK population concern charity, Population Matters. She had been a board member of Marie Stopes for 17 years.

Perhaps her most important contribution was to help create a memorial to the volunteers from the Indian Subcontinent, Africa and the Caribbean who fought with the British in two World Wars. These volunteers who number nearly 5 million had all but been forgotten. Her own father volunteered in the First World War and was a stretcher bearer in Mesopotamia. The Memorial Gates stand on Constitution Hill near Hyde Park Corner.

In September 2011 during a Parliamentary debate on welfare, she singled out Bangladeshi and Pakistani immigrant communities in the United Kingdom and accused them having a large number of children in order to be able to claim welfare benefits. She claimed the issue did not apply to British families of Indian origin as “they are like the Jews of old. They want their children to be educated.” Her comments were not well-received by the government. Labour Party MP Michael Dugher later condemned her and said that her views were “ignorant” and unacceptable - she later admitted that her statement had “gone too far.”

Flather made further controversial comments in November 2012, when she defended Conservative election strategist Lynton Crosby, during an incident in which he used an offensive term referring to Muslims at a meeting when he was working for Mayor of London Boris Johnson. She said: "I don’t condone swearing, but Lynton is right to say it is pointless for the Conservatives to chase Muslim votes. They are all on benefits and all vote Labour."

In 2015 she again was accused of bigotry for implying that consanguineous marriages, which are common in India and account for up to 23% of marriages in South India, were uniquely problematic in the Pakistani community. She also called for a ban of Halal meats in the UK.

== Family and personal life ==
Daughter of Rai Bahadur Aftab Rai, of New Delhi, India, a barrister and diplomat, and Krishna Rai, Flather was the great-granddaughter of Sir Ganga Ram, a noted engineer, philanthropist and agriculturist during the late 19th century and early 20th century in Punjab, British India (now Pakistan). She was married to Gary Denis Flather until his death in 2017. She had two sons from her first marriage, one of whom is Paul Flather. The Baroness's niece is Kesha Ram, a member of the Vermont State Senate.

Flather described herself as a "Hindu atheist". Broadly, she was an atheist with affinity to the most important sayings from the Bhagavad Gita and following them. She was an honorary associate of the National Secular Society.

Flather died on 6 February 2024, at age 89.

== Honours and awards ==
Honorary Doctor of Laws Leeds University, and Honorary Doctor of The Open University and Northampton University. Also Fellow of University College London.

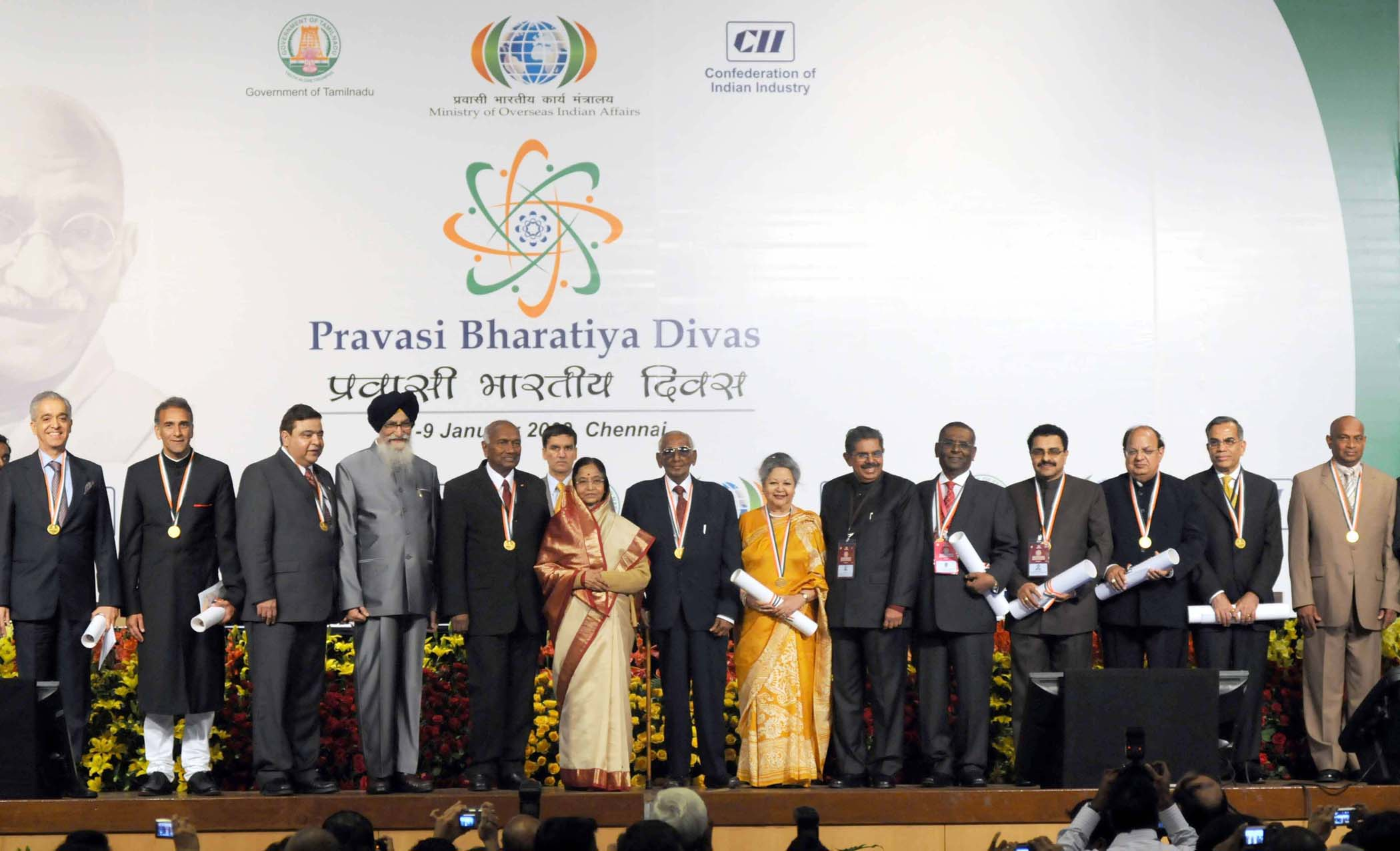
Flather at award ceremony of Pravasi Bharatiya Samman along with President of India, other awardees

Year	Country	Award name	Given by	Field of Merit
2009	United Kingdom	Pravasi Bharatiya Samman	President of India	Academics

== Books ==
Woman Acceptable Exploitation For Profit (2010) ISBN 978-1-84995-002-2

== Arms ==
Coat of arms of Shreela Flather, Baroness Flather

Escutcheon
... couped at the shoulders Sable ducally crowned Or and issuant therefrom a long cap the top turned forward Sable.
Supporters
Dexter a bengal tiger Proper sinister a chinese dragon Or armed Gules each resting the interior hind foot on a bezant.
Motto
Dei Tutamen Tutus
