= Sarv Tomin =

Sarv Tomin سروتمين
- Village
- Location within Iran
- Coordinates: 28°52′00″N 57°57′00″E
- Country: Iran
- Province: Kerman
- County: Jiroft
- Bakhsh: Jebalbarez
- Rural District: Saghder

Population (2006)
  - Total: 70
- Time zone: UTC+3:30 (IRST)
  - Summer (DST): UTC+4:30 (IRDT)

Sarv Tomin (Persian: سروتمين, also Romanized as Sarv Tomīn) is a village in Saghder Rural District, Jebalbarez District, Jiroft County, Kerman Province, Iran. According to the 2006 census, its population was 70 people from 28 families.
