= Paul Flather =

British academic

The Honourable Dr Paul Flather
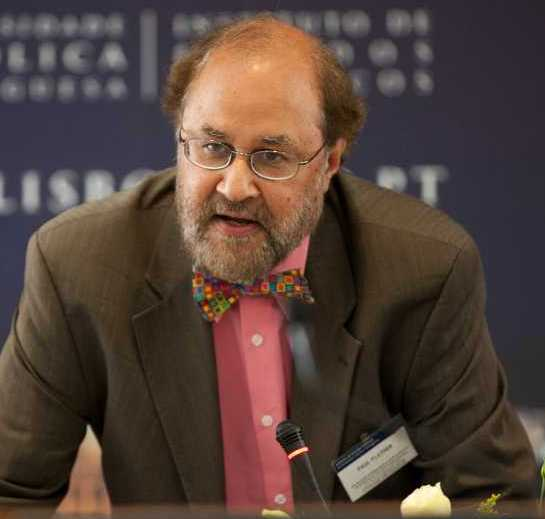

Secretary of Europaeum
- In office 2000–2017

Personal details
- Born: 28 December 1954 (age 71)
- Spouse: Anne Willcocks
- Education: Balliol College, Oxford

Paul Charles Ram Flather (born 28 December 1954) is a British academic. Until 2018 he served as the Secretary-General of the Europaeum, an association of leading European universities, and is Fellow of Mansfield College, Oxford. He is the son of Shreela Flather, Baroness Flather. He was formerly a journalist working for the BBC, Times newspapers and the New Statesman where he was deputy editor. He has written for many publications on education and politics.

== Education and research ==
Flather attended Fox Primary School in London from 1962 to 1963, Hurst Court School in Hastings from 1963 to 1968, and won a scholarship to attend Rugby School from 1968 to 1972.

From 1973 to 1976, he took his BA in Politics, Philosophy, and Economics at Balliol College, Oxford, graduating with a first-class Honours B.A. After working as a journalist and in politics for several years, Flather returned to Oxford and Balliol in 1985 for the completion his MA and DPhil (PhD) research degree on modern Indian politics. He received the Political Studies Association annual award for the best dissertation in any field of political studies for his doctoral thesis in 1991. His research interests focus on Indian democracy since 1947 and more recently on anti-corruption strategies.

These interests arose as a result of family connections to Indian political geography. His family fled Lahore, where his great-great-grandfather had founded hospitals, schools, colleges, and charities at partition settling in Delhi. He was sent to school in the UK and has remained ever since, seeing himself as a child of the Commonwealth with feet in both countries.

=== Selected publications ===
- Co-option and Exclusion: A Study of the Indian Parliament and its MPs -(forthcoming)
- Combating Global Corruption – Editor and presenter or special CD in Offshoots series, published and distributed globally by British Council (2005).
- Drug Abuse among the Young - article for Encyclopaedia Britannica (1985).
- Co-editor of volume of essays on Paradigms of Migration and essay on People on the Move – lessons for the European Political Class (ibiden, 2010).
- Editor Europaeum Review journal, including writer of many keynote articles (2000– )
- Editor of two volumes of essays on Indian life and politics (BOPIO Handbooks, 1996 and 1997)
- Editor of Education Times, special supplement on Indian education for The Times of India (1986).
- Managing Editor and member of Advisory Board of The Oxford Magazine, distributed worldwide (1994–99).
- Education Matters - analysis of UK education attitudes in British Social Attitudes (Gower, 1989).
- Essay on the Future for Dalits on Indian caste politics (published by Ambedkar Society Journal 1998).
- Founder and Editor, CEU Gazette (1991–94).
- The Missing Generation - major investigation into the need for new blood in higher education (which prompted policy changes) – Times Higher Education Supplement (1982).
- Co-presenter/writer of two-hour "special" on the drugs crisis for London Weekend Television (1985).
- Pulling Through - analysis of British social science research, in Government and Social Research (ed. M. Bulmer, Cambridge University Press, 1985).
- Recasting Indian Politics – Essays on Indian Politics and Reform (editor and contributor) (forthcoming Macmillan Palgrave) (2012).
- Should Mother Teresa accept money from the Mafia?, essay on the ethics of giving in Integrity (ed. Alan Montefiore and David Vines - Routledge, 1998)
- The Social Sciences in Crisis - a series of five full page articles in the Times Higher Education Supplement (1983).

== Career and public activities ==
=== Journalism ===
From the mid-1970s and throughout the 1980s, Flather worked as a journalist, first as a freelancer and film, art and book reviewer and later for a number of established regional, national, and international newspapers and media houses. Inter alia, he worked as reporter, correspondent, and editor on media such as the Sheffield Morning Telegraph, Yorkshire TV, BBC Television News, The Times, The Sunday Times, and Times Higher Education, where he worked as feature writer and correspondent, including foreign coverage, specialising in research and social sciences. In 1989, he served as deputy-editor on the New Statesman & Society magazine, commissioning, planning, editing, and writing editorials.

Flather served as press fellow at Wolfson College, University of Cambridge in 1984.

=== Public Service ===
From 1986 to 1990, he was an elected member (regional councillor) of the Inner London Education Authority, chairing the Further and Higher Education sub-committee, with an annual budget of some £340 million. During his time as councillor, Flather also held membership posts at the Association of Metropolitan Authorities and the London Boroughs Association. He was elected to many national education bodies and from 1989 to 1993, he was member of the National Institute of Adult Continuing Education, chairing its public affairs committee until 1991. He has served as expert advisor 1995–6 to the European Commission for its first multi-million Europe-India programme in 1997.

=== Academe ===
After graduating from Balliol College, Oxford, Flather worked variously for the BBC, Times Newspapers, the New Statesman among other journals, before being elected as a full-time politician, chairing London's Post-Schools education committee. He was then appointed founding CEO/Secretary-General for the Central European University in Prague, Warsaw and Budapest, and supporting many Soror-backed Open Society initiatives across the former central and eastern Europe. He had worked with dissident groups in the region during the 1980s.

In the early 1990s, Flather worked for four years for the Open Society Foundation setting up a variety of international Soros programmes and was founding Secretary-General, member of the Senate, and CEO of the Central European University which was originally set up in Prague, Budapest and Warsaw after the 1989 revolutions. Flather was responsible for 80 staff members and an annual budget of £15 million, for negotiations with governments and the CEU's policy development and central administration.

In 1994 Flather was appointed director of international and external relations for Oxford University, running alumni, media, community, governmental, international and publications relations, and a Fellow of Corpus Christi College. Among many achievements, he helped found and run the Oxford Jenkins Scholarships scheme.

He was then recruited as new Director of International and External Affairs at Oxford University, a post he for five years until 2000. The directorate includes the responsibility for all international links, overseas scholarships, media relations, alumni relations, relevant University publications, information and communication, events, and community links. In addition, he served as secretary to the university's International Committee, as treasurer of the Europaeum, as Oxford's University representative to COIMBRA Group. He was also an advisor to Oxford Today and editor of Gazette News.

In 2000, Flather was appointed as secretary-general of the Europaeum, an association of leading European universities, including the University of Oxford, Leiden University, Paris 1 Pantheon Sorbonne, Charles University in Prague, Jagiellonian University in Kraków, the Graduate Institute of International and Development Studies, Complutense University of Madrid, the University of Helsinki, Universitat Pompeu Fabra in Barcelona, LMU Munich, and the Institute of Political Studies, Catholic University of Lisbon as associate member. In 2017, the Europaeum welcomed the University of St Andrews and the University of Luxembourg as its newest members. Flather presided over the growth of the Europaeum, from the original three members when he joined the association, to a total of 13 in 2017. In his time as secretary-general, he coordinated collaborative academic research, study, and teaching programmes for and between member universities. He was also editor of Europaeum Review, director of many research programmes, coordinator for joint study and degree initiatives, and he ran several annual summer schools, spring schools, graduate workshops, policy-making seminars, and classic colloquia. Furthermore, Flather fund-raised for the Europaeum's visiting professorships and scholarships programmes. Flather's time at the Europaeum ended in 2017, when he stepped down from his position as secretary-general. Flather is now the Director of Special Projects at the Europeaum.

Over the years, Flather has given lectures all over the world, chairing sessions and coordinating workshops, conferences and summer schools all over Europe, including high-level sessions for the British Council on how to battle corruption, published many articles, chapters, edited collections, reports and books, and advised the EU on how to take forward is relations with India in the lead to the 50th anniversary of its independence.

Flather joined the Moot in 2004 and currently chairs the Round Table’s Web Group Advisory Group.

At Oxford University, he was Tutor to MPhil students and an Associate Fellow of Queen Elizabeth House, from 1986 to 1987, and a fellow of Corpus Christi College from 1994 to 2000. He has been a Fellow of Mansfield College since 2001.

=== Activism ===
Throughout the 1980s, Flather worked with dissident movements in Central Europe and race equality groups in the UK. In 1985, at that time serving as Trustee of the Jan Hus Educational Foundation, he was arrested and expelled for smuggling books and giving underground lectures in Czechoslovakia. Among many other, prominent intellectuals such as Jacques Derrida, Jürgen Habermas, Charles Taylor, Ernst Tugendhat, Thomas Nagel, and Ernest Gellner, Flather was working with the Foundation to support academic dissidents and promote links between academics in Britain and Czechoslovakia. In 1998, he was awarded a Commemorative Medal by Václav Havel, then President of the new Czech Republic. Flather speaks of his experience during this time here, while discussing restoring scholarship and academic from in Czech and Slovak nations.

Flather also chairs the Noon Educational Foundation supporting Pakistani scholars to study at top UK universities, is on the editorial board of RoundTable journal, serves as chair of the British Organisation of People of Indian Origin, and remains involved with charities, civic bodies and race bodies.

== Talks, Lectures, Broadcasts ==
- Advisor, Global Sustainability Film Awards (16-20 November 2020).
- Convener, Estorii Political Forum 2020. Speaker in 'Europaeum Special Debate: Is Democracy in the 21st Century Beginning to Fail?' (October 2020).
- Voices from Oxford, Mansfield College, Brexit and Science Talk to Ewha Woman's University (2017)
- T-talks, The Optimist’s Guide to Brexit (2017)
- Noon Foundation, Dr Flather on Sir Ganga Ram (2017)
- Chaired conference held in Centre for Contemporary Art, Prague: Václav Havel European Dialogues – Prague Annual Conference 2015 (2015)
- European Commission, Visit of Paul Flather, Secretary General of the Europaeum, to the EC (2014)
- Parliament UK, Foreign Affairs Committee, Written evidence from Dr Paul Flather (2012)
- Closing discussant on European Studies Centre (St. Antony's College) series on Democracy in East/Central Europe, with Professor Jacques Rupnik (Science-Po) (2010)
- Interview, Radio Praha – Delhi, Oxford, Prague – the three homes of Paul Flather (2008).
- Lecturer on Identity and Britishness Bennington College, Vermont USA (2008).
- Lectures series on Corruption and How to Fight it at University of Lima, Peru – to be collected into a volume (2004).
- Keynote lecture on Globalisation and Higher Education to the COIMBRA Rectors Conference and national assembly, Salamanca University and at British Council New Delhi (1998).

== Awards ==
Flather received an Honorary Silver Medal of Jan Masaryk at the Czech Republic Ambassador's residence in London in November 2019.
