= Jonathan Sullivan =

British political scientist and Sinologist

Jonathan Sullivan 蘇立文

Academic background
- Education: University of Leeds; University of Nottingham
- Thesis: Negativity and Information in Campaign Advertising (2010)
- Doctoral advisor: Cees van der Eijk, Phil Cowley, Will Lowe
- Other advisors: Joern Dosch, Chris Dent

Academic work
- Discipline: Political science; Political sociology; Sinology
- Sub-discipline: Political communications; Foreign policy of China; Taiwan studies
- Institutions: Asia Research Institute, University of Nottingham

Head of China Programmes at the Asia Research Institute
- Incumbent
- Assumed office 2018

Director of the China Policy Institute
- In office 2014–2018
- Preceded by: Steve Tsang

Director of the Research, Institute of Contemporary Chinese Studies
- In office 2012–2014
- Website: jonlsullivan.com

Jonathan Sullivan (Chinese: 蘇立文) is a British political scientist and Sinologist who researches political communications in China, Taiwan and other East Asian contexts, China's Internet and cyber-nationalism, studies of the Confucius Institutes, and China's politics of celebrity culture, hip hop and football.

Sullivan is Head of China Programmes at the Asia Research Institute (ARI) and associate professor in Politics and international relations at the University of Nottingham. Sullivan is an editor of The Asia Dialogue, the online journal of the ARI. He is a co-founder of the China Soccer Observatory (CSO) with Simon Chadwick and a member of The China Quarterly Executive Committee.

== Early life and education ==
Sullivan comes from Kent, England. After receiving his bachelor's degree in Modern Chinese Studies and Master's degree in Asia Pacific Studies, all at the University of Leeds, Sullivan went to the University of Nottingham for learning Political science, where he got another master's degree (2005–2006) and completed his PhD (2006–2010).

== Academic career ==
From 2009 to 2011, Sullivan was a RCUK Fellow for China, Globalization and Civil Society. In 2012, he moved over to the Institute of Contemporary Chinese Studies, University of Nottingham to work with Steve Tsang, who was Head of the School, as Director of Research. In 2014, Sullivan went back to the School of Politics as Director of the China Policy Institute (CPI).

He was the Director of the CPI and Editor-in-Chief of the institute's online journal China Policy Institute: Analysis until 2018, when the CPI merged into ARI.

Sullivan was a British Science Association media fellow who facilitated a period of work at and writing for the BBC.

== Works ==
=== Books ===
- A New Era in Democratic Taiwan: Trajectories and Turning Points in Politics and Cross-Strait Relations, with Chun-Yi Lee (Routledge, 2018)
- China's Football Dream (Asia Research Institute e-Book, 2018)
- Taiwan: A Contested Democracy Under Threat, with Lev Nachman (Agenda Publishing, 2023)

=== Selected articles ===
- Sullivan, J., & Wang, W. (2022). China's "Wolf Warrior Diplomacy": The Interaction of Formal Diplomacy and Cyber-Nationalism. Journal of Current Chinese Affairs.
- Sullivan, J., Jeu, S. & Wang, W. (2021). Rising Cyber China. Turkish Policy Quarterly.
- Sullivan, J., & Lee, D. S. (2018). Soft Power Runs into Popular Geopolitics: Western Media Frames Democratic Taiwan. International Journal of Taiwan Studies, 1(2), 273–300.
- Sullivan, J. (2014). China's Weibo: Is Faster Different?. New Media & Society, 16(1), 24–37.

=== Selected op-eds ===
- Trump, Taiwan, and the ‘One China’ Policy. The Diplomat. 28 February 2017.
- How the Global Media Frames Taiwan and Gets it Wrong. Global Taiwan Institute 1(13). 14 December 2016.
- Chinese Celebrity and the Soft Power Machine. China Film Insider. 3 April 2016.
- "Asia for Asians": Would it mean "Asia for Chinese?" India-China Chronicle. May–June 2015.
- The Taiwan-China Meeting. The Diplomat. 11 February 2014.
