= Andreas Fulda =

German political scientist

- Born: 1977 (age 48–49); Bonn, West Germany
- Education: University of Cologne (BA); SOAS University of London (MA); Free University of Berlin (PhD)
- Scientific career
- Fields: Political science
- Workplaces: University of Nottingham
- Doctoral advisor: Eberhard Sandschneider

Andreas Martin Fulda (Chinese: 傅洛达; born 1977) is a German political scientist, sinologist, sociologist, and an expert on China–EU relations. He is currently an associate professor of politics at the University of Nottingham and a senior fellow at the University of Nottingham Asia Research Institute and China Policy Institute of this university. Fulda is a foreign affair advisor of the Inter-Parliamentary Alliance on China (IPAC). He had lived and worked in Mainland China and Taiwan as a staff of the China Association for NGO Cooperation (CANGO) for eight years. Between 2017 and 2019, Fulda worked as the principal investigator for a Ford Foundation-funded project to monitoring the implementation of China’s overseas law. Fulda frequently comments on current Chinese affairs in the media and he is a fierce critic of the Chinese Communist Party (CCP). Fulda argues that German universities do not need to rely on Confucius Institutes to organise events on China. His book The Struggle for Democracy in Mainland China, Taiwan and Hong Kong (2020) led to a smear campaign against him. Andreas Fulda sharply criticized German chancellor Olaf Scholz's November 2022 visit to China.

== Education ==
Fulda received his BA in Chinese Studies from the University of Cologne (2000), MA in Chinese Studies from SOAS University of London (2001), and PhD in Politics from Free University of Berlin (2007).

== Works ==
=== Books ===
External videos
- Hong Kong Protests: "Xi Jinping is a Stalinist Presiding over a Leninist Party-state"(France 24 English, 2019)
- Dr. Fulda: Stalinist Xi from Leninist CCP of China - A Single-party Maoist State (Idź Pod Prąd TV, 2020)

- China and Germany: How Entanglement Undermines Freedom, Prosperity and Security. Bloomsbury (2024)
- The Struggle for Democracy in Mainland China, Taiwan and Hong Kong: Sharp Power and its Discontents. Routledge (2020)
- Civil Society Contributions to Policy Innovation in the PR China. Palgrave Macmillan (2015) (editor)
- Förderung partizipativer Entwicklung in der VR China [Promoting Participatory Development in the PR China]. Springer (2009)

=== Selected articles ===
- "The Emergence of Citizen Diplomacy in European Union–China Relations: Principles, Pillars, Pioneers, Paradoxes." Diplomacy & Statecraft 30.1 (2019): 188–216.
- "The Religious Dimension of Hong Kong's Umbrella Movement." Journal of Church and State 60.3 (2018): 377–397.
- "The Contested Role of Foreign and Domestic Foundations in the PRC: Policies, Positions, Paradigms, Power." Journal of the British Association for Chinese Studies 7 (2017).
- "New Strategies of Civil Society in China: A Case Study of the Network Governance Approach." Journal of Contemporary China 21.76 (2012): 675–693.
- "Bridging the Gap: Pracademics in Foreign Policy." PS: Political Science & Politics 44.2 (2011): 279–283.
- "Reevaluating the Taiwanese Democracy Movement: A Comparative Analysis of Opposition Organizations under Japanese and KMT Rule." Critical Asian Studies 34.3 (2002): 357–394.
- "The Politics of Factionalism in Taiwan's Democratic Progressive Party." Internationales Asienforum 33.3/4 (2002): 323–350.
