= Marius Ostrowski =

British-German academic

Marius Sebastian Ostrowski FRHistS FRSA
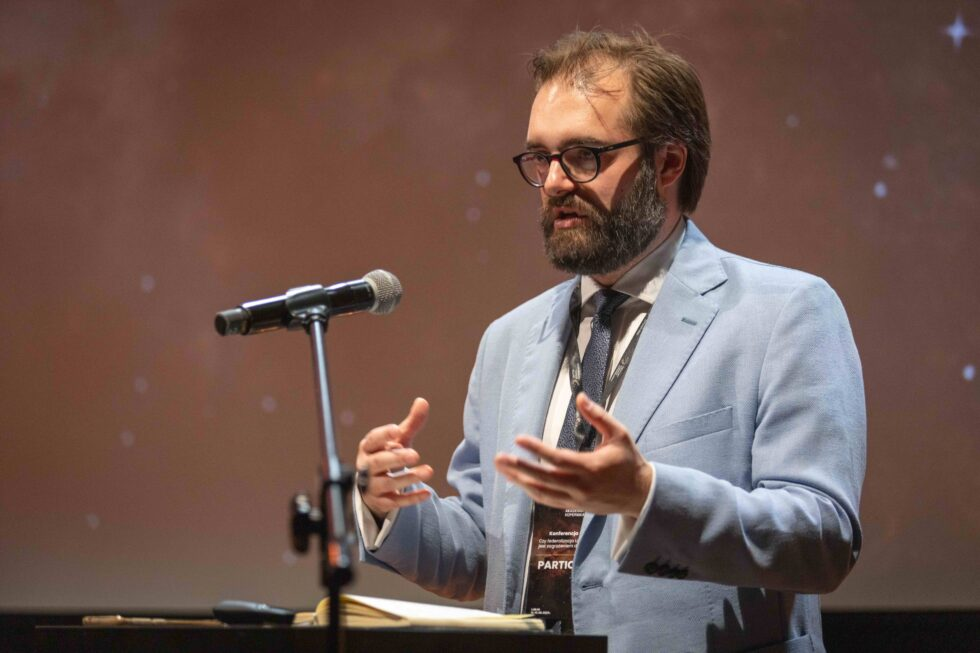
- Ostrowski in 2024
- Born: 12 December 1988 (age 37); Frankfurt am Main, Germany
- Occupations: Academic and policy researcher

Academic background
- Education: University of Oxford (BA, M.Phil., D.Phil.)
- Thesis: Twilight of the pollsters: A social theory of mass opinion in late modernity (2017)
- Doctoral advisor: Michael Freeden
- Other advisor: Cécile Fabre · Lois McNay
- Influences: Ahmed · Althusser · Bernstein · Bourdieu · Butler · Fraser · Godelier · Heidegger · Koselleck · Leontief · Luckmann · Luhmann · MacKinnon · Meadows · Poulantzas · Schopenhauer · Skocpol · Therborn · Wallerstein

Academic work
- Discipline: History · politics · sociology
- Sub-discipline: History of ideas · ideology studies · social theory
- Institutions: Magdalen College, Oxford; All Souls College, Oxford; European University Institute; Blavatnik School of Government

Marius Sebastian Ostrowski (German: [ˈmaːʁɪʊs zɛˈbastɪan ɔsˈtʁɔvskiː]; born 12 December 1988) is a German-British political and social theorist, historian of ideas, and policy researcher. His research interests lie in the comparative and historical study of ideas and ideologies, focusing on how social contexts shape patterns of ordinary thinking and everyday behaviour. He also writes on national strategy, the theory and history of social democracy, and progressive visions of European integration.

== Early life ==
Ostrowski was born in Frankfurt am Main, West Germany, to parents from Sighișoara and Poznań. In 1994, he immigrated to the United Kingdom, settling in Surrey. From 1997, he attended Colet Court (now St Paul's Junior School), and in 2002, he became a King's Scholar and Music Scholar at Eton College, where he achieved 10 A-levels, including Classical Greek, history, linguistics, mathematics, and music.

From 2007 to 2010, Ostrowski studied philosophy, politics, and economics at the University of Oxford, winning a Demy-fellowship and music scholarship at Magdalen College, and graduating with a First. He continued his studies with an M.Phil in political theory (2010–12), and a D.Phil. in politics (2012–17), under the supervision of Michael Freeden. He wrote his doctoral thesis on the mid-2010s crisis in the opinion polling industry, drawing on the history of ideas, opinion research, political science, social psychology, and sociological theory. In 2013, Ostrowski won election to an Examination Fellowship in politics at All Souls College.

== Career ==
While completing his D.Phil., Ostrowski taught politics at Christ Church and Magdalen College, Oxford, and the New College of the Humanities (now Northeastern University London). Beginning in 2018, he started a multi-volume translation of the collected works of Eduard Bernstein, and published Left Unity (2020), making the case for closer collaboration between progressive forces in society.

In 2020, he became a Max Weber Fellow at the Robert Schuman Centre for Advanced Studies, European University Institute (EUI) in Florence, pursuing a project on the ideological prehistory of the European Union, especially neglected Europeanist ideas in interwar progressive thought. During his time at the EUI, Ostrowski brought out his second monograph Ideology (2022), which develops a distinctive approach to ideology theory, building on the morphological approach of Michael Freeden.

In 2022, Ostrowski was appointed the founding director of the Lifelong Education Institute (LEI), a new thinktank focused on lifelong learning, integrated tertiary education, and the political economy of skills. At the same time, he succeeded Michael Freeden and Mathew Humphrey as editor-in-chief of the Journal of Political Ideologies, and took up a position as Honorary Assistant Professor at the Centre for Research into Ideas and the Study of Political Ideologies, University of Nottingham.

With the support of the Foundation for European Progressive Studies, he embarked on a multi-year project investigating the prospects for a European Universal basic income, which culminated in the book A Radical Bargain for Europe (2024). After leaving the Lifelong Education Institute in 2024, Ostrowski returned to Oxford as an ESRC Policy Fellow and Researcher at the Blavatnik School of Government, as part of an academic–Civil Service collaborative project on improving the UK's approach to long-term, national strategy. While working on this project, Ostrowski published How We Think (2026), which describes how our social experiences over the course of our lives shape our personalities, emotions, how we process and judge information, and our reasoning styles into ten distinct 'thinker-types'.

== Music ==
Ostrowski began to learn piano at the age of 3, followed soon after by the clarinet, organ, and music composition, studying with Ruth Nye, Stephen Goss, and James Weeks. He remains an active pianist and composer, writing above all for keyboard. During the COVID-19 pandemic, he recorded the entirety of J.S. Bach’s Goldberg Variations, published on his YouTube channel The Piano Diaries.

=== Selected compositions ===
- Processional March (2012) for organ, to celebrate the wedding of two friends in Magdalen College, Oxford.
- Fugue in E (2019) for piano.
- Reverie (2020) for piano.
- Concert Fantasia on Bella Ciao (2020) for piano, to mark the 75th anniversary of Victory in Europe Day.
- Suite-sonata degli ostinati (2020) in four movements for piano, as a gift at the end of his fellowship at All Souls College, Oxford.
- Hochzeitsstück (2022) for harmonium/piano, to celebrate the wedding of two friends in Bad Gastein, Austria.
- Saraswati stotram (2024) for piano.

== Honours ==
In 2021, Ostrowski was elected a Fellow of the Royal Historical Society and a Fellow of the Royal Society of Arts, United Kingdom. In 2023, he was appointed as one of the inaugural members of the Chamber of Legal Studies of the Nicolaus Copernicus Academy, Poland.

== Selected works ==
=== Monographs ===
- Left Unity: Manifesto for a Progressive Alliance (Rowman & Littlefield, 2020)
- Ideology (Polity, 2022)
- (with Dominic Afscharian, Viktoriia Muliavka, and Lukáš Siegel) A Radical Bargain for Europe: Progressive Visions of a European Basic Income (Rowman & Littlefield, 2024)
- How We Think: Ten Thinker-Types to Understand Ourselves and Those Around Us (Hodder & Stoughton, 2026)

=== Translations ===
- Eduard Bernstein on Social Democracy and International Politics: Essays and Other Writings (Palgrave Macmillan, 2018)
- Eduard Bernstein on the German Revolution: Selected Historical Writings (Palgrave Macmillan, 2019)
- Eduard Bernstein on Socialism Past and Present: Essays and Lectures on Ideology (Palgrave Macmillan, 2021)

=== Selected articles ===
- ‘How (Not) to Form a Progressive Alliance: Lessons from the History of Left Cooperation’, The Political Quarterly 92(1) (2021), 23–31.
- ‘Social Democracy and “positive” foreign policy: the evolution of Eduard Bernstein’s international thought, 1914–1920’, History of Political Thought 42(3) (2021), 520–64.
- ‘Ideology studies and comparative political thought’, Journal of Political Ideologies 27(1) (2022), 1–10.
- ‘"Reform or revolution", redux: Eduard Bernstein on the 1918–19 German Revolution’, Historical Research 95(268), 213–39 (2022).
- (with Dominic Afscharian, Viktoriia Muliavka, and Lukáš Siegel) ‘The state of the UBI debate: Mapping the arguments for and against UBI’, Basic Income Studies 17 (2022).
- ‘From “noble patriotism” to the “republic of peoples”: Eduard Bernstein and the “national question” in Social Democracy’, History of Political Thought 43(3) (2022), 517–54.
- (with Dominic Afscharian, Viktoriia Muliavka, and Lukáš Siegel) ‘Into the unknown: Empirical UBI trials as Social Europe’s risk insurance’, European Journal of Social Security 24(3) (2022).
- ‘The ideological morphology of left–centre–right’, Journal of Political Ideologies 28(1) (2023), 1–15.
- ‘Europeanism: A historical view’, Contemporary European History 32(2) (2023), 287–304.
- ‘Ideology and the individual’, Journal of Political Ideologies 29(1) (2024), 1–25.
- 'The apotheosis of conceptual morphology', Journal of Political Ideologies 30(1) (2025), 1–31.
- 'Ideology and social action', Journal of Political Ideologies 31(1) (2026), 1–44.

=== Selected policy reports ===
- (with Dominic Afscharian, Viktoriia Muliavka, and Lukáš Siegel) The European Basic Income: Delivering on Social Europe (Foundation for European Progressive Studies, 2021)
- (with Dominic Afscharian) Building Resilient Democracies: Challenges and Solutions across the Globe (Foundation for European Progressive Studies, 2022)
- Hungry to learn: Lifelong Learning Pathways for the agri-food sector (Lifelong Education Institute, 2023)
- Making skills work: The path to solving the productivity crisis (City & Guilds and Lifelong Education Institute, 2024)
- Mapping the course: Education partnerships for continuous skills development (Lifelong Education Institute, 2025)
- UK national strategy in historical perspective: Turning points and ideological developments, 1850–2025 (Blavatnik School of Government, 2025)
- National capacities: A model for national strategy (Blavatnik School of Government, 2025)
