= The Year 1000: When Explorers Connected the World—and Globalization Began =

2020 book by Valerie Hansen

- Cover
- Author: Valerie Hansen
- Audio read by: Cynthia Farrell
- Language: English
- Subject: World history, globalization
- Publisher: Simon & Schuster
- Publication date: April 14, 2020
- Publication place: United States
- Media type: Print, e-book, audiobook
- Pages: 308
- ISBN: 978-1-5011-9410-8
- Dewey Decimal: 909/.1
- LC Class: D123 .H37 2020

The Year 1000: When Explorers Connected the World—and Globalization Began is a 2020 book by the American historian Valerie Hansen.

Hansen dates the beginning of globalization to around the year 1000. New trade routes, she argues, connected regions that had been isolated from one another, and the Norse landing on Newfoundland brought the Americas into contact with Europe, Asia, and Africa for the first time. The book's chapters deal with the Vinland voyages, the Maya and Cahokia, the Kievan Rus, the African gold and slave trades, Central Asia, the Indian Ocean, and Song-dynasty China. Hansen describes the goods, religions, and people that moved along the routes, and the effects of that movement on people who did not travel. The New York Times Book Review named it an Editors' Choice.

== Background ==
Hansen said she started working on the book when she finished The Silk Road: A New History. Histories of the Silk Road conventionally end around the year 1000, when the Library Cave at Dunhuang was sealed. Rong Xinjiang has proposed that the sealing was a response to the Muslim Karakhanid conquest of the Buddhist oasis of Khotan. Hansen noticed how close the dates fell: the conquest was complete before 1006, the Liao and Song dynasties signed the Treaty of Chanyuan in 1005, and the Norse had landed in Canada around 1000. After about five years of weighing whether the events were connected, she concluded that the same process of regional expansion lay behind all three.

In an interview with James Cuno and Mary Miller, she revealed that the order of the chapters changed repeatedly during the writing process, and that she settled on starting with the Vikings because they are familiar to readers and because the Icelandic sagas, unlike the sources for most of the other peoples in the book, provide a detailed account of what the Norse thought of the indigenous residents of L’Anse aux Meadows and how the indigenous peoples reacted to the Norse. Miller, a specialist in Maya art, said that she and her mentor Michael Coe had long debated whether the Vikings reached the Yucatán, and that when the Chichén Itzá murals of fair-haired captives were found in the 1930s, no one raised the possibility that they depicted Vikings because the site at L'Anse aux Meadows had not yet been discovered.

Hansen also mentioned that while writing she had regarded the globalization of the year 1000 as differing from the modern kind only in degree, but that the COVID-19 pandemic, which came between the book's completion and its publication, made her rethink that position. She recalled that she had looked hard for evidence of epidemics spreading when peoples first came into contact around the year 1000 and found none, a puzzle she said she could explain only by the brevity of those contacts or by the silence of the sources. Hansen also described the book's climate-based explanations as tentative, given that the understanding of the world's climate in the year 1000 was still in its preliminary stages.

In a 2021 dialogue with Huiyao Wang of the Center for China and Globalization, Hansen identified the rise of genuinely long-distance sea travel, by the Vikings, the Polynesians, and the Chinese, as the decisive change around the year 1000, since overland trade was constrained by how much animals could carry. She explained that she was not claiming globalization was fully developed at that time: natural limits on shipping meant that no exporting country could produce enough goods to overwhelm another country's local manufacturing, as archaeological finds of local copies of Chinese ceramics in Iran show.

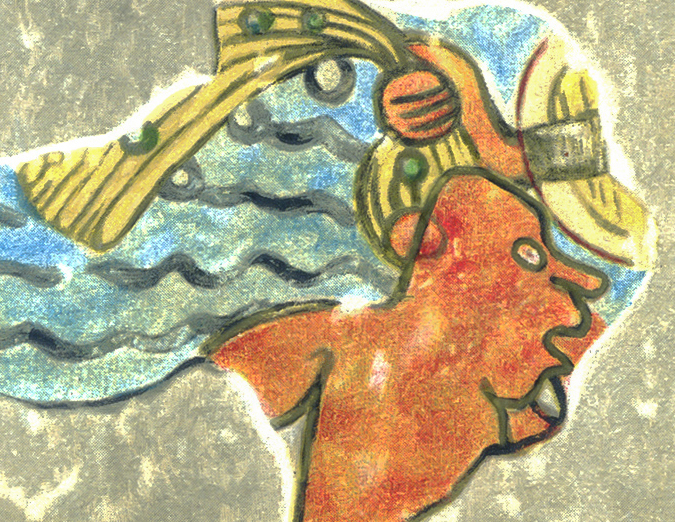
"Captive Vikings?" Watercolor by Ann Axtell Morris, reproduced in Earl Halstead Morris, The Temple of the Warriors at Chichen Itza, Yucatan (Washington, D.C.: Carnegie Institution of Washington, 1931), vol. II, plate 147b.

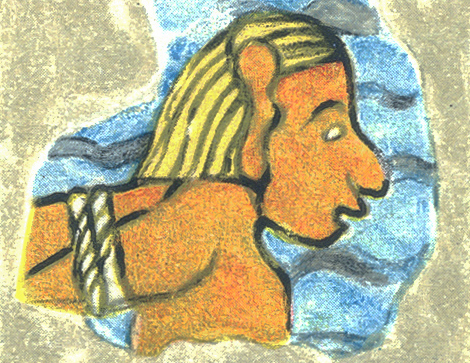
"Captive Vikings?" Watercolor by Ann Axtell Morris, reproduced in Earl Halstead Morris, The Temple of the Warriors at Chichen Itza, Yucatan (Washington, D.C.: Carnegie Institution of Washington, 1931), vol. II, plate 147c.

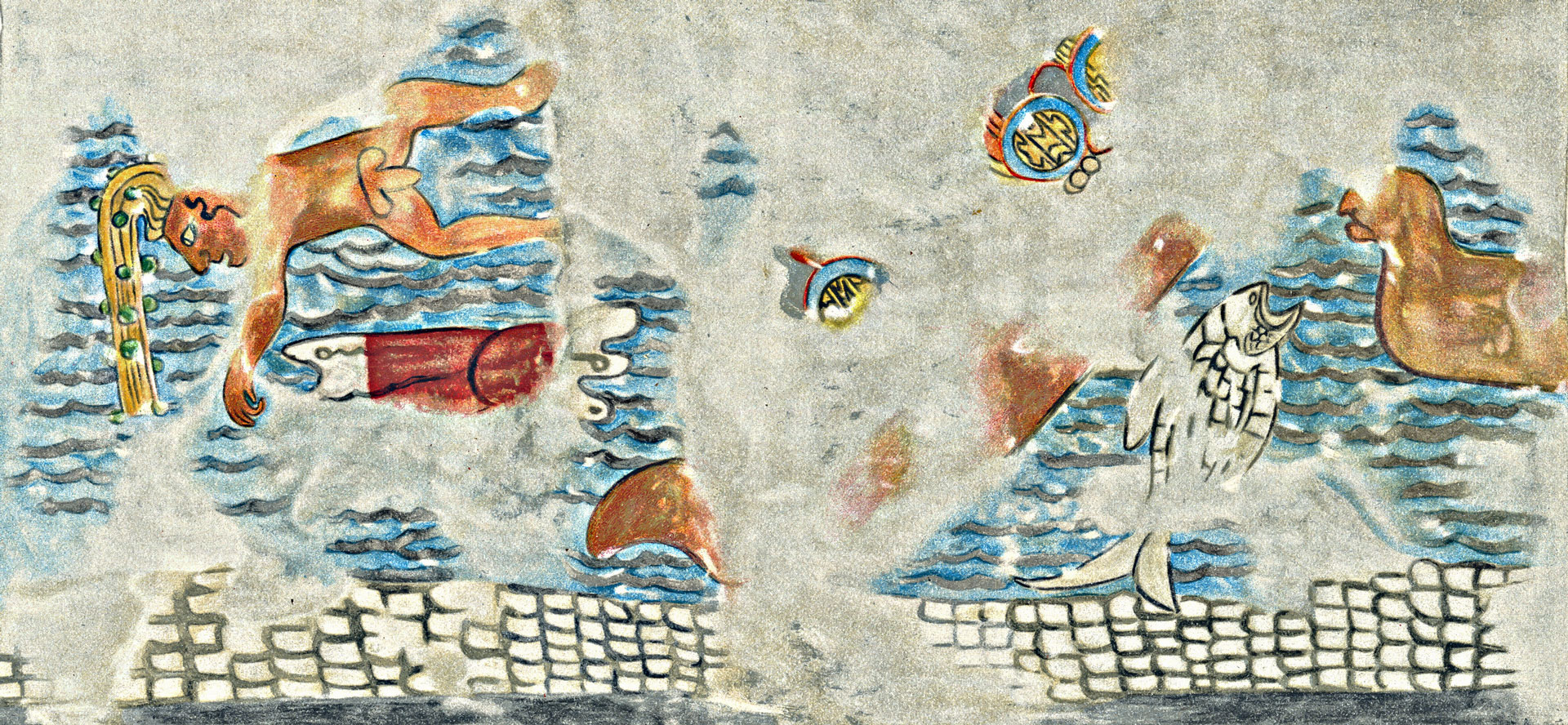
Maya Battle Scene. Watercolor by Ann Axtell Morris, reproduced in Earl Halstead Morris, The Temple of the Warriors at Chichen Itza, Yucatan (Washington, D.C.: Carnegie Institution of Washington, 1931), vol. II, plate 139.

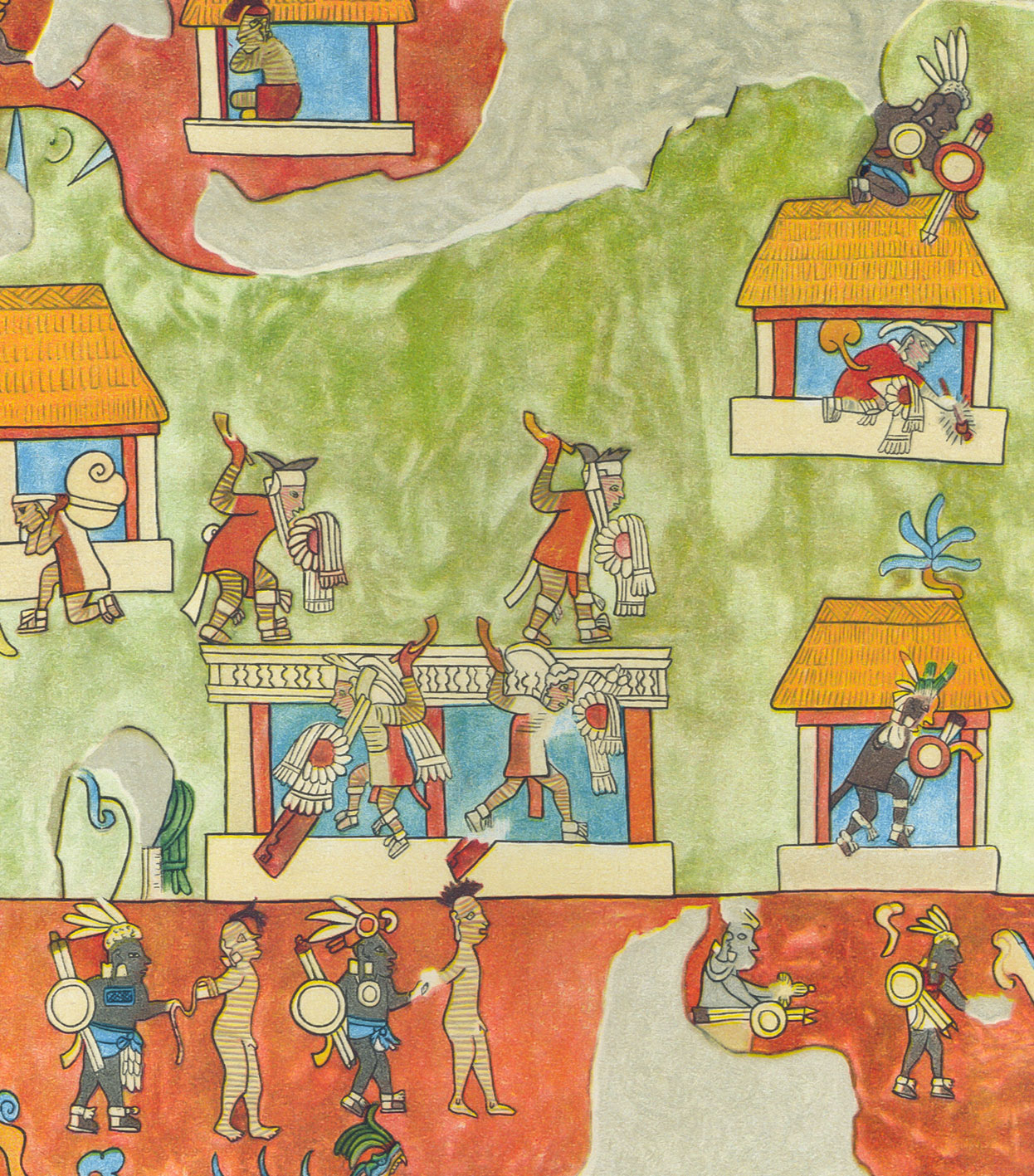
Invasion of the Temple of the Warriors. Watercolor by Ann Axtell Morris, reproduced in Earl Halstead Morris, The Temple of the Warriors at Chichen Itza, Yucatan (Washington, D.C.: Carnegie Institution of Washington, 1931), vol. II, plate 139.

== Awards ==
The New York Times Book Review named it an Editors' Choice.

== Synopsis ==
In the introduction, Hansen argues that globalization began around the turn of the first millennium, when trade routes took shape across the world, carrying goods, technologies, religions, and people between regions. She dates the start to the Norse landing on Newfoundland around the year 1000, the moment the existing trade networks of the Americas joined those of Europe, Asia, and Africa: "For the first time in world history an object or a message could travel all the way around the world." In a prologue, she pictures the Chinese port of Quanzhou in the year 1000, a city of imported sandalwood furniture, African ivory, and foreign worshippers. The changes of that era, she contends, reached ordinary people, not only elites.

Hansen surveys the world of 1000 AD: roughly 250 million people, the largest concentrations in Song-dynasty China. She uses the available sources, above all the Arabic and Persian "routes and realms" geographies and Chinese accounts of foreign lands, alongside archaeology in regions that left no writing. Starting in chapter 2, the narrative then works outward from the North Atlantic. Hansen recounts the three Norse voyages to Vinland described in the Vinland sagas and the excavations at L'Anse aux Meadows that confirmed a Norse presence in Newfoundland. She considers whether shipwrecked Scandinavians reached the Yucatán Peninsula, a possibility argued from murals at Chichén Itzá showing blond-haired captives and a boat built of planks. She concludes that this is an intriguing possibility, but that the evidence is not conclusive. In a chapter on the Americas, she reconstructs the networks the Norse briefly connected with. Here, the author links Chichén Itzá with Cahokia in the Mississippi Valley and with Chaco Canyon in New Mexico, where storage jars retained the chemical signature of Maya chocolate, and traces metalworking knowledge carried north from the Andes.

Hansen follows the Rus down the rivers of Eastern Europe, where the fur and slave trades drew hundreds of thousands of Islamic silver coins to Scandinavia. Prince Vladimir of Kiev's adoption of Byzantine Christianity in 988 or 989 serves as her example of the wave of royal conversions that redrew the religious map around 1000: "92 percent of today's believers subscribe to one of the four religions that gained traction then." The gold and slave trades tied West and East Africa to Cairo and Baghdad. Central Asia split into Islamic and Buddhist blocs: when the Buddhist Liao emperor made a diplomatic overture in 1026, the Muslim Mahmud of Ghazna refused it. Malay voyages reached Madagascar and Polynesians settled the Pacific. The temple states of Srivijaya, the Cholas, and Angkor turned their trade after 1000 from India toward China. Hansen calls Song China "the most globalized place on earth": a manufacturing power whose dragon kilns fired export ceramics by the tens of thousands and whose consumers at every social level bought imported aromatics taxed through an elaborate system of maritime trade superintendencies.

European explorers did not create globalization, Hansen argues in an epilogue reaching past 1500. They plugged into networks that already existed, often with the help of intermediaries such as da Gama's pilot Malemo Cana, Malinché, and Squanto. Globalization produced winners and losers from the beginning. Hansen calls the attacks on foreign merchants in Guangzhou, Cairo, and Constantinople "the world's first anti-globalization riots," and finds that "those who remained open to the unfamiliar did much better than those who rejected anything new."

== Critics ==
In her New York Times review, Christiane Bird called the book fascinating. Hansen shows the Europeans who sailed for the Americas in the late fifteenth and sixteenth centuries "were only using existing trade routes," noted bird. Religion, she said, played "a strikingly central role": conversion was a matter of calculation rather than conviction, with rulers taking up a powerful neighbor's faith for what it might bring them in trade and politics. The narrative sometimes "bogs down in mind-numbing descriptions of dynasties and tribes", Bird wrote, and Hansen's professorial "we" drew the reader "out of the world she has created and into the lecture hall". She thought of both as "minor disturbances in an otherwise highly impressive, deeply researched, lively and imaginative work".

The novelist Karin Altenberg called The Year 1000 "a gripping account of exploration and ingenuity", built by touching down in widely separated places at a single moment and showing how they were connected. The suggestion that Norse sailors reached the Yucatán Peninsula she found "more astonishing still—if less reliable". Globalization in 1000 may have opened the world to rulers, Altenberg wrote, but ordinary lives remained circumscribed, and there was "little sense of a wider, cosmopolitan embrace of a common humanity".

Publishers Weekly called it a "vivid and edifying account," and credited Hansen with "a remarkable lightness of touch while stuffing the book full of fascinating details".

Wan Wee Pin (Note: A review in the National Library Board's magazine BiblioAsia) praised the book's breezy style and the author's refusal to let the account bog down in detail, picking out her handling of the Rus fur and slave traders who gave Russia its name, of the derivation of "slave" from "Slav", and of the Jewish, Muslim, Latin-rite and Eastern-rite representatives who each tried to convert Prince Vladimir. Pin thought the book timely at a moment of Sino-American trade friction and rising nativism.

Jonathan Good welcomed Hansen's insistence that globalization has always produced winners and losers, but made the Norse voyages his main complaint: her wish to establish global linkages, he argued, leads her to overstate their importance. Citing Birgitta Wallace, he wrote that L'Anse aux Meadows was occupied for less than ten years because the voyages were too costly for the Greenland Norse to sustain, and judged the site a novelty beside the trade networks that followed Columbus and da Gama. Harsher still was his verdict on Hansen's reading of light-haired figures in a Maya mural as captive Vikings, which he called "speculation worthy of" Gavin Menzies's 1421: The Year China Discovered America, while acknowledging that she rejects Menzies's thesis. Hansen "never really explains" why this first age of globalization should have begun when it did, Good added, and the roundness of the date may be no more than a coincidence. He thought the book "more popular than scholarly" but "informative, accessible, and even fun", and usable in an upper-level undergraduate world history course. (Note: The review was published in Arthuriana)

Tilman Frasch (Note: The book review was published in the International Quarterly for Asian Studies.) was not persuaded. Frasch granted that the Vikings crossed the North Atlantic, but held that the connection was episodic and ended with their retreat from the American settlements before 1100, after which the Americas had little further part in world trade until Columbus. The networks of eastern Eurasia, by contrast, were well under way by Hansen's "snap year" and in some cases may have been centuries older, and were traveled not by explorers but by "traders, pilgrims, envoys and warriors, who knew the routes and destinations". Frasch also found the treatment of the Near East, India and Southeast Asia lacking in depth.

R. Michael Feener called the book "a work of truly world historical scope" and thought that by locating globalization in a world with no industry and no nation-states Hansen gave "more nuanced understandings" of matters such as extraterritoriality. Some of her cases are "rather tentative or halting steps toward closing the global loop", he wrote, and others sit awkwardly with the title date, among them the fourteenth-century Mansa Musa. As a historian of Southeast Asia, Feener could not see why the journeys of Austronesian and South Indian mariners should be counted surprising. He called these quibbles, and described the book as "powerful" and "potentially popular corrective" to what he termed "teleological historiographies of globalization" that cast much of the world as an object of European discovery.

Michael Laver (Note: In a review published in World History Connected) found Hansen's case persuasive and her arguments "backed up in every instance with textual and archeological evidence", but thought that considering the brief Norse presence in North America as having "kicked off globalization" was "a bit of an overstatement". A few Vikings blown off course toward Mexico were "not exactly globalization", he wrote, nor necessarily was long-distance trade in commodities. The argument, in his view, is best taken as "a thought-provoking exercise" showing that interregional trade and migration are not modern inventions, and as a reminder that China and South Asia have long been central to the world economy and will remain so. Laver called the book "meticulously researched and footnoted", and thought it would serve readers from high school to graduate school.
