= Clare Chambers (philosopher) =

British political philosopher

Academic background
- Education: University of Oxford
- Thesis: Equality and Autonomy for All? Liberalism, Feminism and Social Construction (2003)
- Doctoral advisor: Lois McNay, David Miller

Academic work
- Discipline: Philosophy
- Sub-discipline: Feminism, Political Philosophy
- Institutions: University of Cambridge; Somerville College, Oxford
- Website: www.clarechambers.com

Clare Chambers (born 1976) is a British political philosopher at the Faculty of Philosophy at the University of Cambridge.

== Life ==
Chambers received her DPhil in political theory from the University of Oxford, and she subsequently taught at the University of Oxford (she was a Mary Somerville Junior Research Fellow at Somerville College) and the London School of Economics, before moving to the University of Cambridge. She has published on feminism, liberalism, and social construction.

== Philosophical work ==
In her 2008 book Sex, Culture, and Justice: the Limits of Free Choice, Chambers is concerned about what the state's response should be to cultural practices which individuals freely choose to partake in as a way of securing certain goods, when those practices impose disproportionate costs on vulnerable members of the community. She defends three main claims. First, individual preferences to pursue certain activities are shaped by social construction: if individuals are raised to follow certain practices which are deemed choiceworthy in their community, then they will be more disposed to follow these practices later in life. Second, if social construction brings individuals to form preferences for activities that are self-degrading or self-harmful, the individuals in question are victims of an unjust process of social construction. Third, the state is permitted to prohibit self-degrading or self-harmful activities that individuals freely choose to follow when their preference for following these activities was shaped by an unjust process of social construction; this is because preferences formed by an unjust process of social construction are morally suspect, and the state has a greater obligation to free individuals from pernicious practices that harm and degrade them than to satisfy morally suspect preferences. According to Marion Smiley, Chambers' use of the notion of an unjust process social construction "to justify, as well as to limit, prohibition, provides us with a whole new and productive way of using the state to promote gender equality," and she argues that a particular virtue of Chambers' work is that it "makes clear why we do not have to choose between gender equality and autonomy in our efforts to prevent harm in the lives of women and all others."

In her 2017 book Against Marriage: An Egalitarian Defense of the Marriage-Free State she argues that marriage violates both equality and liberty so should not be recognised by the state, nor have any legal status. This built on her earlier paper 'The marriage-free state' which makes the case for abolishing state-recognized marriage and replacing it with piecemeal regulation of personal relationships.

== Bibliography ==
Books

- Chambers, Clare (2008). Sex, Culture, and Justice: The Limits of Choice. University Park, PA: The Pennsylvania State University Press. ISBN 9780271033013.
- Political Philosophy: A Complete Introduction. ISBN 9781444167061
- Chambers, Clare (2017). Against Marriage: An Egalitarian Defence of the Marriage-Free State. Oxford: Oxford University Press. ISBN 9780198744009.
- Intact: A Defence of the Unmodified Body. ISBN 9780241439050

Selected Papers

- "The Marriage-Free State" in Proceedings of the Aristotelian Society Vol. CXIII No. 2 (2013)
- "Each outcome is another opportunity: Problems with the Moment of Equal Opportunity" in Politics, Philosophy & Economics (PPE) Vol. 8 No. 4 (2009).
- "Inclusivity and the constitution of the family" in Canadian Journal of Law & Jurisprudence (2009, 1).
- "Torture as an evil: Response to Claudia Card" in Criminal Law & Philosophy Vol. 2 No. 1 (January 2008).
- "Masculine domination, radical feminism and change" in Feminist Theory Vol. 6 No. 3 (December 2005).
- "Autonomy and equality in cultural perspective: Response to Sawitri Saharso" in Feminist Theory Vol. 5 No. 3 (December 2004).
- "Are breast implants better than female genital mutilation? Autonomy, gender equality and Nussbaum's political liberalism" in Critical Review of International Social & Political Philosophy (CRISPP) Vol. 7 No. 3 (Autumn 2004).
