= McNay =

McNay is the surname of the following notable people:

- Don McNay (1959–2016), American financial author
- Lois McNay, British political theorist and academic
- Marion Koogler McNay (1883–1950), American painter, art collector, and art teacher
- Michael McNay (1935–2026), British journalist and author
- Stuart McNay (born 1981), American sailor
