= Valerie Hansen =

American historian (born 1958)

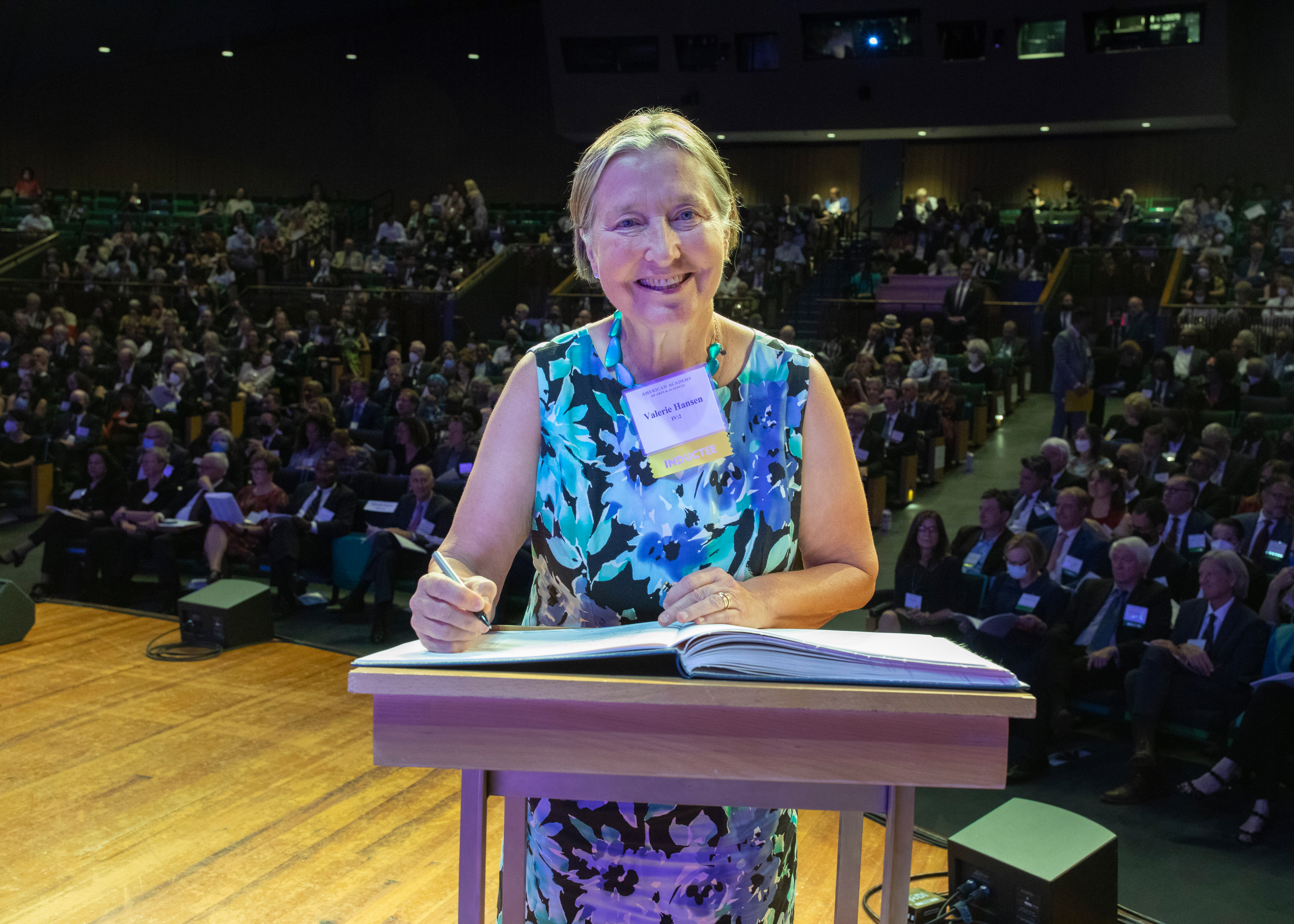
- Hansen signing the Book of Members at her induction into the American Academy of Arts and Sciences
- Born: 1958 (age 67–68)

Academic background
- Education: Kent School, Harvard University (AB); University of Pennsylvania (MA, PhD)
- Thesis: Popular Deities and Social Change in the Southern Song Period (1127–1276) (1987)
- Doctoral advisor: Robert M. Hartwell

Academic work
- Discipline: History
- Sub-discipline: History of China to 1600, the Silk Road, world history
- Institutions: Yale University
- Website: valerie-hansen.com

Valerie Hansen (born 1958) is an American historian. She is the Stanley Woodward Professor of History at Yale University, where she teaches Chinese and world history and studies the Silk Road and the religious and legal history of premodern China. Her books include The Silk Road: A New History (2012), The Open Empire: A History of China to 1800 (2015), and The Year 1000: When Explorers Connected the World—and Globalization Began (2020).

== Early life and education ==
Hansen graduated from Kent School in 1975 and from Harvard University in 1979, where she received an A.B. magna cum laude in East Asian studies. She then studied Chinese at the Inter-University Program for Chinese Language Study in Taipei from 1979 to 1981, and was a Fulbright-Hays fellow at Kyoto University from 1984 to 1986. She received an M.A. in 1983 and a Ph.D. in 1987 from the University of Pennsylvania. Her dissertation was on popular deities and social change in the Southern Song dynasty under the direction of Robert M. Hartwell (1932 – 1996).

== Career ==
After a year as a visiting assistant professor at Connecticut College, Hansen joined the Yale history department as an assistant professor in 1988. She became an associate professor in 1993 and a professor in 1998, and was appointed to the Stanley Woodward chair in 2017.

From 1995 to 1998, Hansen was principal investigator of the Silk Road Project: Reuniting Turfan's Scattered Treasures, a collaboration of twenty-five Chinese and American scholars funded by the Henry Luce Foundation. The project compiled a bilingual Chinese–English finding guide to more than 3,000 documents and artifacts removed from the Turfan oasis by expeditions before World War I and dispersed among collections in Europe and Asia.

Hansen spent 2005–06 in Shanghai on a Fulbright research grant, taught in 2008–09 and 2011–12 at Yale's joint undergraduate program with Peking University, and taught the fall 2015 semester at Yale-NUS College in Singapore. While researching and working on her book, The Year 1000, she held visiting positions at Xiamen University, the University of Birmingham, and the Collège de France, where she was an invited lecturer in 2019. At Yale she has taught lecture courses on Chinese history and the Silk Road, including China Present to Past and The World Circa 1000, along with seminars on documents of the Tang, Song, and Yuan dynasties.

== Works ==
Hansen's first book, Changing Gods in Medieval China, 1127–1276 (1990), a revised version of her 1987 dissertation, argued that the religious changes of the Southern Song grew out of social and economic developments, as increasingly mobile cultivators adopted gods from outside their home regions. Her second book, Negotiating Daily Life in Traditional China: How Ordinary People Used Contracts, 600–1400 (1995), used surviving contracts (including land contracts buried in tombs) to study how ordinary people understood the law.

In 2000, she published The Open Empire: A History of China to 1600, a textbook arguing, against the view that outsiders never influenced traditional China, that Indian Buddhists and northern nomadic peoples shaped China throughout its history. A second edition appeared in 2015. With Kenneth R. Curtis, she also wrote the world-history textbook Voyages in World History, first published in 2010 and as of 2026 in its fourth edition.

In 2012, Hansen published The Silk Road: A New History, which argued that the Silk Road trade was small-scale and usually involved local goods. Oxford University Press released an expanded classroom edition in 2017, The Silk Road: A New History with Documents, containing fifty-two primary sources in translation.

In April 2020, The Year 1000: When Explorers Connected the World—and Globalization Began was published. Hansen explains that a set of trade routes established around the year 1000 (around the time of the Norse landings in Newfoundland) linked the world's regions for the first time, and that globalization began then rather than with the European voyages of the 1490s. Translated into sixteen languages, it received mostly favorable reviews.

== Bibliography ==
=== Books ===
- Changing Gods in Medieval China, 1127–1276 (Princeton University Press, 1990) ISBN 978-0691608631
- Negotiating Daily Life in Traditional China: How Ordinary People Used Contracts, 600–1400 (Yale University Press, 1995) ISBN 978-0300060638
- The Open Empire: A History of China to 1600 (W. W. Norton, 2015, 2nd edition) ISBN 978-0-393-93877-7
- Voyages in World History (with Kenneth R. Curtis; Wadsworth Cengage Learning, first edition 2010; second edition 2013; third edition 2016; fourth edition 2022)
- The Silk Road: A New History (Oxford University Press, 2012) ISBN 978-0190218423; expanded edition, The Silk Road: A New History with Documents (Oxford University Press, 2017)
- The Year 1000: When Explorers Connected the World—and Globalization Began (Scribner, 2020) ISBN 978-1-5011-9410-8

=== Edited volumes ===
- The Silk Road Key Papers, Part I: The Pre-Islamic Period (Global Oriental, 2012)
- Textiles as Money on the Silk Road (with Helen Wang), special issue of the Journal of the Royal Asiatic Society #23.2 (2013)
- Perspectives on the Liao (with Daniel Kane and François Louis), special issue of the Journal of Song Yuan Studies #43 (2013)

== Awards and honors ==
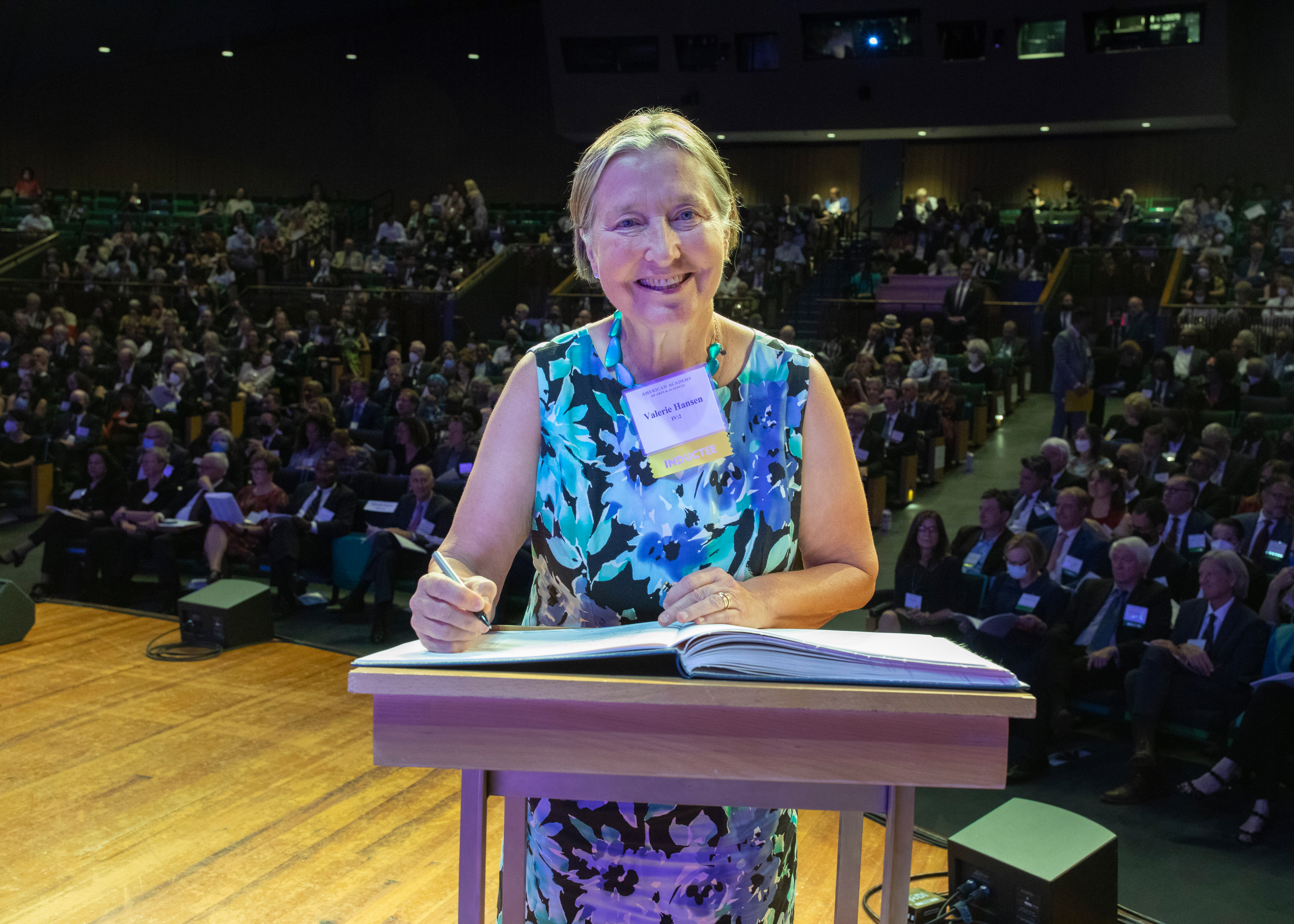
Here is Hansen signing the Book of Members at an Induction Ceremony, which celebrated elected artists, scholars, scientists, and leaders in the public, nonprofit, and private sectors, for the American Academy of Arts and Sciences.

- 1998 – National Endowment for the Humanities Fellowship for University Teachers
- 2007 – Graduate Mentor Award in the Humanities, Yale Graduate School
- 2013 – Gustav Ranis International Book Prize, co-winner, for the best book on an international subject by a member of the Yale University faculty
- 2013 – International Convention of Asia Scholars Book Prize Reading Committee Accolade for the best teaching tool in the Humanities
- 2019 – Invited lecturer, Collège de France
- 2021 – Elected to the American Academy of Arts and Sciences
