= Paul Heywood =

British academic

Paul Heywood is a British academic who is head of the School of Politics and International Relations at the University of Nottingham. Heywood is Sir Francis Hill Professor of European Politics, co-editor of Government and Opposition journal and a Fellow of the Royal Society of Arts.
