= Mark N. Franklin =

- Born: January 29, 1942 (age 84); Grahamstown, South Africa
- Education: Cornell University
- Scientific career
- Fields: Political science
- Workplaces: European University Institute
- Thesis: Voice of the Backbench : Patterns of Behavior in the British House of Commons (1970)
- Doctoral advisor: Andrew J. Milnor

Mark Newman Franklin (born January 29, 1942) is a political scientist specializing in voting and elections. Since September 2006, Franklin had been the inaugural Stein Rokkan Professor of Comparative Politics at the European University Institute (EUI) until he retired in 2011. He is the founder of the Public Opinion and Participation Section of the European Union Studies Association, and was the President of the European Politics and Society section of the American Political Science Association. He was John R. Reitemeyer Professor Emeritus of International Politics at Trinity College until he retired in 2007 and Local Affiliate at Minda de Gunzburg Center for European Studies, Harvard University. He got his BA and MA from University of Oxford. In 1970, he competed his PhD at the Cornell University.

== Works ==
- Electoral Change (1992)
- Choosing Europe? The European Electorate and National Politics in the Face of Union (1996), with Cees van der Eijk
- Voter Turnout(2004)
- The Economy and the Vote: Economic Conditions and Elections in Fifteen Countries (2007), with Cees van der Eijk
- Elections and Voters (2009), with Cees van der Eijk
