= David Regan =

British academic (1939–94)

David Regan (9 July 1939 – 25 July 1994) was a British academic who was a head of the School of Politics and International Relations at the University of Nottingham. Regan was a Francis Hill Professor of Local Government at the University of Nottingham and a member of the Bruges Group that rejected the idea of a 'federal' European Union.

== Death ==
Regan died by suicide by carbon monoxide poisoning on the university park campus of the University of Nottingham. Regan cited his treatment at Nottingham in a suicide note.

A Service of Thanksgiving for his life was held at the Church of St Mary the Virgin, High Pavement, Nottingham, on 22 October 1994. According to the cited source, tributes were paid by the Reverend Tom Irvine, Baroness Blatch, County Councillor John Hayes, Sir Harry Djanogly, Professor Dennis Kavanagh, and Rebecca Regan. The source also states that speakers highlighted his contributions to the study of pluralist democracy and his influence on students.
