= Journal of Political Ideologies =

- Discipline: Political science
- Language: English
- Edited by: Marius Ostrowski

Publication details
- History: 1996-present
- Publisher: Routledge
- Frequency: Triannually
- Impact factor: 1.6 (2023)

Standard abbreviations
- ISO 4: J. Political Ideol.

Indexing
- ISSN: 1356-9317 (print); 1469-9613 (web)
- LCCN: 96660831
- OCLC no.: 300119434

Links
- Journal homepage; Online access; Online archive

The Journal of Political Ideologies is a triannual peer-reviewed academic journal covering the analysis of political ideologies. The journal publishes research on the theoretical and conceptual aspects of political ideology, and on the nature and roles of particular ideological practices.

Based on 2023, Scimago Journal Rank is 0.343. Its 5 year impact factor in 2023 is 1.6.

== History ==
The journal was established by British political theorist Michael Freeden, then professor at the University of Oxford, and first published in 1996. He served as the editor until 2020. Mathew Humphrey served as the editor from 2020 to 2023, during which the journal was hosted at the Centre for Research into Ideas and the Study of Political Ideologies (CRISPI) at the University of Nottingham. Since August 2023, it has been edited by Marius Ostrowski, Research Fellow at the Robert Schuman Centre for Advanced Studies, European University Institute.

== Editorial team ==
The Associate Editors comprise Eloise Harding (University of Southampton), Emily Katzenstein (TU Munich), and Richard Elliott (Georgetown University). The Editorial Advisory Board members include Carole Pateman, Pierre Rosanvallon, Quentin Skinner, and Slavoj Žižek.

== Abstracting and indexing ==
The journal is abstracted and indexed in Scopus (ELSEVIER), Social Sciences Citation Index (Clarivate), Academic Search Ultimate (EBSCO), IBZ Online (De Gruyter), Social Science Premium Collection (ProQuest), Index Islamicus (Brill), Political Science Database (ProQuest), Sociology Source Ultimate (EBSCO), Educational research abstracts - ERA (Taylor & Francis Online), Geobase (ELSEVIER), Political Science Complete (EBSCO).

== See also ==
- List of political science journals
