= Michael Freeden =

British political scientist

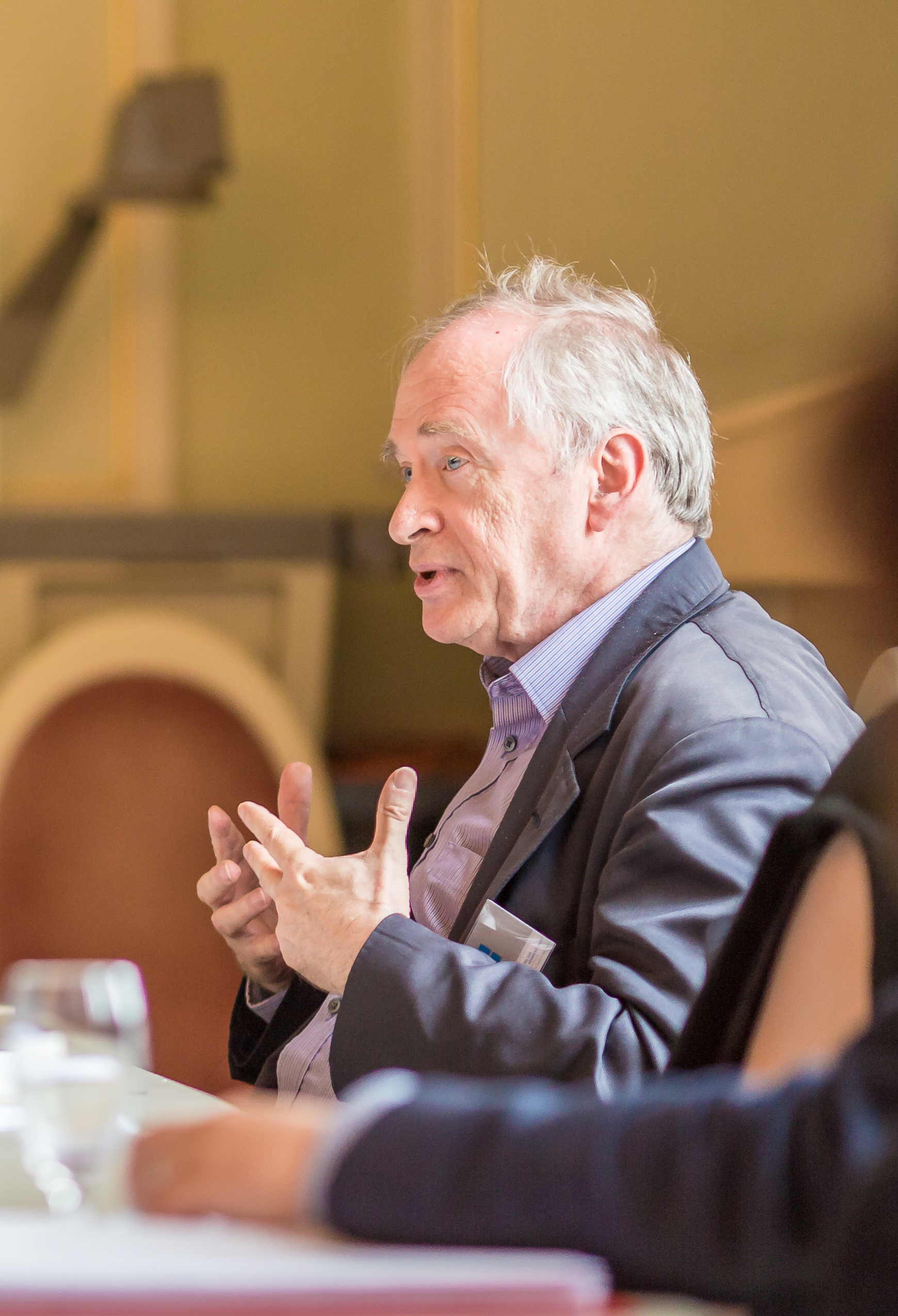
- Freeden at the conference "Modus Vivendi" in Münster
- Born: 1944 (age 81–82)
- Occupation: Professor

Academic work
- Discipline: Political scientist
- Sub-discipline: Ideology studies
- Institutions: University of Oxford; School of Oriental and African Studies, University of London; University of Nottingham
- Notable students: Uri Gordon; Marius Ostrowski

Michael Freeden (born 30 April 1944) is a British political scientist who is an Emeritus Professor of Politics at University of Oxford and Professorial Fellow at Mansfield College. He is a leading theorist of ideology and the founding editor of the Journal of Political Ideologies.

== Life ==
He received his MA and DPhil in politics from the University of Oxford. From 1978 to 2011, he engaged in teaching and research there. Between 2013 and 2015, he was Professor of Political Theory in the School of Politics and International Relations at the University of Nottingham. Between 2016 and 2019, he was Professorial Research Associate at the SOAS, University of London. After retirement, he remains as a DPhil supervisor in political theory at University of Oxford.

== Academics ==
=== Ideology ===
Freeden's research interests include political theory, emotions, ideology, liberalism, methods, rights and justice. He has been noted for his analysis of contemporary ideologies. He has rejected the traditional definition of ideologies, which sees the latter as static "belief systems" and instead bases his analysis on modern semantics. Just like languages, ideologies consist of certain concepts whose meaning may change and evolve over time. The specific relations between ideological concepts may be analyzed by being set in their respective semantic fields.

Each ideology may be seen as having both "core" concepts (that is, those of the highest importance, e.g. class conflict in Marxism or freedom in liberalism) and "peripheral" (or secondary) concepts. Concepts may gain or lose importance over time, just as new concepts may emerge (or be borrowed from other ideologies) or fall out of use entirely. Different ideologies may give different meanings to the same term (a concept such as equality will have a material definition in Marxism while in liberalism it will rather have a legal and political importance). In this sense, concepts are defined by their relation to other concepts. According to Freeden, it is precisely these conceptual relations that should attract our attention as they will be likely to evolve in the long term.

By studying the conceptual evolution of ideologies, Freeden observes that the relative "political success" of an ideology depends on its ability to impose the belief that its own conceptual definitions are the "correct ones". This gives rise to a form of "conceptual competition", in which each ideology performs a continuous "decontestation" of its concepts; that is, it tries to eliminate all possible contestation of its own conceptual definitions, thereby rejecting competing definitions (Marxism will thus reject private property as a product of the exploitative nature of capitalism, just as liberalism may view state intervention as an infringement of individual freedoms).

This decontestation is not only the product of an inter-ideological competition (between ideologies), but it is also the product of an intra-ideological competition (within ideologies): hence the success of Friedrich Hayek's form of neoliberalism during the 1980s, or of the Marxist–Leninist trend in the 1920s.

=== Liberalism ===
Another side of Freeden’s work, another branch of Freedenism, is the Freeden who embraces more overtly his particular commitment to liberalism, not just in intellectual-historical interpretive mode, but also in ideological, critical or prescriptive mode: the Freeden of The New Liberalism (1978), Liberalism Divided (1986), Rights (1991), and Liberal Languages (2005).

== Works ==
- The New Liberalism: An Ideology of Social Reform (Oxford, 1978)
- Liberalism Divided: A Study in British Political Thought 1914-1939 (Oxford, 1986)
- J.A. Hobson: A Reader (London, 1988)
- Minutes of the Rainbow Circle 1894–1924, edited and annotated (London, 1989)
- Reappraising J.A. Hobson: Humanism and Welfare (ed.) (London, 1990)
- Rights (Buckingham, 1991)
- Ideologies and Political Theory: A Conceptual Approach (Oxford, 1998)
- Reassessing Political Ideologies: The Durability of Dissent (ed.) (London, 2001)
- Ideology: A Very Short Introduction (Oxford, 2003)
- Liberal Languages: Ideological Imaginations and Twentieth Century Progressive Thought (Princeton, 2005)
- Taking Ideology Seriously: 21st Century Reconfigurations (co-editor with G. Talshir and M. Humphrey) (London, 2006)
- The Political Theory of Political Thinking: The Anatomy of a Practice (Oxford, 2013)
- Liberalism: A Very Short Introduction (Oxford, 2015)

== Awards ==
- Sir Isaiah Berlin Prize for Lifetime Contribution to Political Studies Award of the UK Political Studies Association, 2012
- Medal for Science, Institute of Advanced Studies, University of Bologna, 2012
