= The Open Empire: A History of China to 1800 =

2000 book by Valerie Hansen

- Cover of the second edition (2015)
- Author: Valerie Hansen
- Language: English
- Subject: History of China
- Publisher: W. W. Norton & Company
- Publication date: 2015
- Publication place: United States
- Media type: Print (paperback)
- Pages: 458
- ISBN: 978-0-393-93877-7 (2nd edition)
- LC Class: DS735.H25 2015
- 1st edition published 2000 as The Open Empire: A History of China to 1600, 478 p., ISBN 978-0393973747

The Open Empire: A History of China to 1800 is an academic monograph by the American historian Valerie Hansen. It was first published in 2000 with the subtitle A History of China to 1600, and a revised edition with a chapter on the Qing empire was published in 2015.

Hansen argues that China developed as an open society, shaped by trade, conquest, and religious exchange with neighboring peoples, and rejects the traditional view of it as a closed civilization. She sets aside the dynastic-cycle framework of Chinese historiography, based instead on archaeological finds and on sources describing the lives of ordinary people.

== Content ==
Hansen covers Chinese history from the earliest written records, around 1200 BC, to the arrival of European missionaries at the end of the sixteenth century; the book began as an undergraduate course she taught at Yale University. Against the closed, self-contained China described by Matteo Ricci and later European observers, she presents a society with porous borders, remade again and again by foreign contact. She also drops the dynastic cycle framework, which in her view "exaggerates the importance of the emperor and minimizes the contribution of other social groups". Emperors stay in the background, as the author follows the people court historians ignored (women, merchants, monks, farmers, slaves) and trends that cut across dynasties, from taxation and population to attitudes toward marriage, sexuality, and the afterlife.

Much of the evidence comes from twentieth-century archaeology: the oracle bones of Anyang, the sacrificial pits at Sanxingdui, the Qin legal texts from Shuihudi, the Mawangdui tombs, contracts recycled as grave goods at Turfan, and the manuscripts of the Dunhuang library cave. For the lives the official histories leave out, Hansen turns to fiction, plays, poetry, tomb epitaphs, letters, contracts, and paintings, including a good deal of writing by women. Seventeen maps and 70 illustrations accompany the text.

The book is divided into three chronological parts. "Inventing China (ca. 1200 B.C.–A.D. 200)" covers the beginnings of writing, the Shang polity (a "soft state" among several sophisticated neighbors), the wars and rival philosophies of the Eastern Zhou, and the bureaucratic empire built by the Qin and Han. "Facing West (A.D. 200–1000)" is about China's ties to India and Central Asia: the arrival and adaptation of Buddhism, centuries of non-Chinese rule in the north, the Tang dynasty, and the An Lushan rebellion of 755, for Hansen "the major turning point in premodern Chinese history". "Facing North (1000–1600)" sets the Song commercial revolution (paper money, iron production, examination culture, footbinding) against the Khitan Liao, Tangut Xia, and Jurchen Jin states, the Mongol conquest of all China (Hansen attributes the fourteenth-century population collapse to plague carried east by Mongol horsemen, not Mongol harshness), and the Ming, whose wall-building and sea bans she treats as a late break with an older openness. In the last thousand years the book covers, she writes, non-Chinese rule "was more often the norm than an aberration". An epilogue asks why the scientific and industrial revolutions came in Europe rather than China after 1600, weighing New World crops, population growth, surplus labor, and interstate competition, and ends by noting that China's most inventive periods were times of political disunity.

== Reception ==
In her review of the first edition, Alfreda Murck called it "a lively and provocative book that gives a rich picture of early Chinese society," one that used new archaeology and the voices of minorities to complicate the standard account of Chinese history. Murck liked its sense of the choices open to people of different classes, and its unusually full coverage of the Khitan Liao, Tangut Xia, and Jurchen Jin. But the stress on foreign contact and daily life crowded out other subjects: the Book of Changes read as an afterthought next to the pages on the Book of Songs.
