= Janet Coleman =

British historian (born 1945)

Janet Coleman FRHistS
- Born: 1945 (age 80–81); New York City, U.S.
- Citizenship: British
- Awards: Leverhulme Major Research Fellowship (2001–2004)

Academic background
- Education: Yale University (Ph.D.); L'Ecole Pratique des Hautes Études

Academic work
- Discipline: Political theory
- Sub-discipline: Ancient Greek and Roman political thought, medieval philosophy, theories of citizenship and the state
- Institutions: London School of Economics; Exeter University; University of Cambridge

Janet Coleman FRHistS (born 1945, New York City) is a British academic and historian of political theory.

== Life ==
She is currently a professor of ancient and medieval political thought at the London School of Economics. She was the first woman to receive a chair in the LSE government department. Her research interests include ancient Greek and Roman political thought, medieval philosophy, and theories of citizenship and the state.

Coleman studied at L'Ecole Pratique des Hautes Etudes in Paris and received her Ph.D. degree from Yale University. She has held teaching appointments in politics at Exeter University and on the History Faculty of the University of Cambridge.

In 1980 she co-founded (with Iain Hampsher-Monk) the academic journal History of Political Thought, which she continues to co-edit. She is a Fellow of the Royal Historical Society.

Coleman has taught at LSE since 1989, where from 2001 to 2004 she held a Leverhulme Major Research Fellowship. Her lectures in the introductory government course at the LSE are known for her attempts to "'be' political philosophers from the ancient Greeks to Machiavelli." Coleman plans to retire in 2010. She has been offered a Global Distinguished Professorship at New York University.

== Select bibliography ==
- English Literature in History 1350-1400: Medieval Readers and Writers, 1981
- Against the State: Studies in Sedition and Rebellion, 1990
- Ancient and Medieval Memories: Studies in the Reconstruction of the Past, 1992
- The Individual in Political Theory and Practice, 1996
- Scholastics, Enlightenments and Philosophic Radicals: Essays in Honour of J. H. Burns (ed.), 1999
- A History of Political Thought, from Ancient Greece to Early Christianity, 2000
- A History of Political Thought, from the Middle Ages to the Renaissance, 2000
