= Cees van der Eijk =

Dutch political scientist

Academic work
- Discipline: Political science
- Sub-discipline: Social Science Research Methods
- Institutions: University of Nottingham
- Doctoral students: Jonathan Sullivan

Cees van der Eijk is a Dutch political scientist. He is a Corresponding Member of the Royal Netherlands Academy of Arts and Sciences (KNAW) since 2006. He is an Honorary Fellow of the Amsterdam School of Communication Research, University of Amsterdam. He is Professor of Social Science Research Methods at the University of Nottingham. He was Professor of Political Science at the University of Amsterdam until 2004. Van der Eijk sits on the Research Advisory Board of the Committee on Standards in Public Life.

== Publications ==
=== Monographs ===
- The Essence of Politics (Amsterdam University Press, 2019)

=== Co-authored books ===
- Consequences of Context: How the Social, Political, and Economic Environment Affects Voting (Rowman & Littlefield, 2021), with Hermann Schmitt and Paolo Segatti
- Elections and Voters (2009), with Mark N. Franklin
- The Economy and the Vote: Economic Conditions and Elections in Fifteen Countries (Cambridge University Press, 2007), with Wouter van der Brug and Mark N. Franklin
- Choosing Europe? The European Electorate and National Politics in the Face of Union (1996), with Mark N. Franklin
