= History of Political Thought =

Academic journal

- Discipline: Political science, philosophy, history
- Language: English
- Edited by: Janet Coleman, Iain Hampsher-Monk

Publication details
- History: 1980–present
- Publisher: Imprint Academic (United Kingdom)
- Frequency: Quarterly

Standard abbreviations
- ISO 4: Hist. Political Thought

Indexing
- ISSN: 0143-781X
- LCCN: 81649673

Links
- Journal homepage; Online access; Online archive

History of Political Thought (HPT) is a quarterly peer-reviewed academic journal, which was established in 1980. It is dedicated to the history of political thought and political philosophy. The journal is published by Imprint Academic (Exeter, England). It was co-founded by the historians Iain Hampsher-Monk and Janet Coleman.

== History ==
History of Political Thought created a space for multi-disciplinary academic discourse on political thought to be published. Initial journals were created as an outlet for the politics department at the University of Exeter.

Ten years after the creation of the journal, it was ranked 2nd out of 135 political science journals in a Political Studies Association peer review. It was also nominated as one of the top 100 Journals of the Century by subject-specialist librarians in the field of politics and international relations. It has been ranked as an A journal by the Australian Political Studies Association.

== Abstracting and indexing ==
The journal is abstracted and indexed in:

- Scopus
- IBZ Online
- Philosopher's Index
- Arts & Humanities Citation Index
- Worldwide Political Science Abstracts
- Sociological Abstracts
- Historical Abstracts
- L'Année philologique
- International Bibliography of the Social Sciences
