= School of Politics and International Relations, University of Nottingham =

International relations school of the University of Nottingham

School of Politics and International Relations
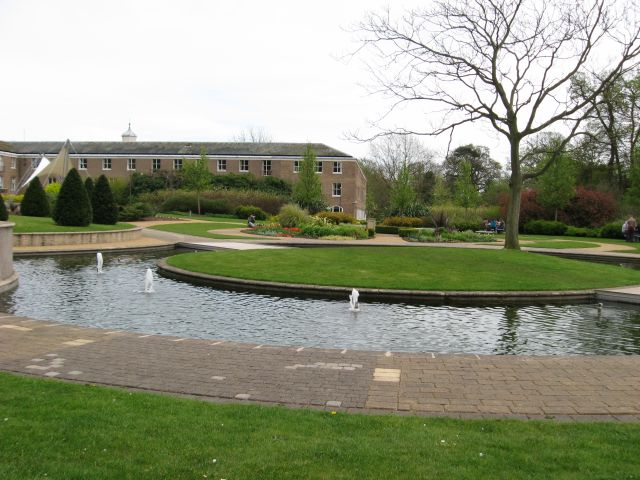
- The School of Politics and International Relations is in the Law and Social Sciences Building (pictured) on the University Park Campus of the University of Nottingham.
- Type: Academic department
- Established: 1965
- Parent institution: University of Nottingham
- Head of School: Siim Trumm
- Academic staff: 60
- Location: Nottingham, UK
- Website: http://www.nottingham.ac.uk/politics/index.aspx

The School of Politics and International Relations is an academic department at the University of Nottingham, England. It is housed in the Law and Social Sciences Building (LASS) together with Law and Sociology. The school runs nine undergraduate programmes, nine postgraduate programmes and have a 40-strong PhD community. Research activity in the school is ranked around 7 Institutes.

As of 2019 the head of school is Siim Trumm.

In 2013 the department was chosen along with the University of Oxford and the University of Manchester to host the 2015 British Election Study. In the 2008 Research Assessment Exercise the Department's research was ranked in the top 10 departments of Politics in the country and 85% of the research was considered of international standard. The department ranks 12th in The Guardian's 2013 league table of Politics departments. The Complete University Guide ranked Nottingham 10th for Politics in 2013 and 13th for Politics in 2014.

== History ==
The School of Politics and International Relations at Nottingham was established in 1965 and was initially housed in the old Engineering Building. Richard Pear was the first professor of Politics. Politics had previously been taught as early as 1959 as part of the Department of Social Science where Politics formed part of a joint degree in Politics and Economics.

In 1971 the Sir Francis Hill chair was established following an endowment from the Municipal Mutual Insurance Company and Frank Stacey, an expert in local government was appointed. In 1981 Dennis Kavanagh joined the school. Kavanagh is best known for his work on the Nuffield Election Studies. The School moved to the 'Orchards' Building during the 1980s. Several new degrees were introduced during the 1980s including an MA in Political Economy and Political Culture and a joint BA in Politics and History and an MA in International Relations.

In 1994 the head of department David Regan committed suicide by carbon monoxide poisoning and cited his treatment by the University of Nottingham in a suicide note. The University rejected calls for a public inquiry into the death. In 1999 the school moved to the Law and Social Sciences Building (LASS) and changed its name to the ‘School of Politics and International Relations' in 2005.

In 2011 the school gained national media attention following the arrest of two students - one of whom, Rizwaan Sabir, was completing a PhD related to terrorism. Rod Thornton, an academic in the department, published a paper critical of the department's handling of the incident and was subsequently suspended. The University of Nottingham described the paper as defamatory to a number of Thornton's colleagues in the department. Thornton later left by "mutual consent".

In 2015 Times Higher Education reported that the Home Office had refused a visa for the academic Miwa Hirono, an expert on Chinese foreign policy, on the basis she had spent around 200 days in the past five years resident in China researching China's foreign peacekeeping and humanitarian operations. Matthew Humphrey, head of Nottingham's School of Politics and International Relations said that the policy was "vindictive and bone-headed".

== Research ==
The current research centres are:

- The Centre for Normative Political Theory
- Centre for Conflict, Security and Terrorism
- Centre for the Study of European Governance
- Centre for the Study of Social and Global Justice
- Centre for British Politics
- Institute for Asia-Pacific Studies
- Methods and Data Institute

=== China Policy Institute ===
The China Policy Institute (CPI) is a research centre in the School of Politics and International Relations that is focused on various aspects of contemporary China. It has a remit to disseminate policy relevant insights from academic research and to actively engage policymakers, society and business actors. The CPI works closely with the Foreign and Commonwealth Office and other stakeholders.

The Director of the China Policy Institute is Jonathan Sullivan. Former Directors include Richard Pascoe, currently executive director of the Great Britain China Centre, and Steve Tsang, current Director of the SOAS China Institute.

== Journals ==
The Department currently hosts four leading politics journals.

- Government and Opposition [Impact factor: 0.8 (2012)]
- Parliamentary Affairs [Impact factor: 1.238 (2008)]
- Political Studies [Impact factor: 0.400 (2012)]
- Political Studies Review

== Notable people ==
=== Staff ===
- Paul Heywood – expert on corruption
- Michael Freeden – Author of Ideologies and Political Theory a landmark study on political ideology
- Steven Fielding – political historian
- Richard J. Aldrich

=== Honorary professors ===
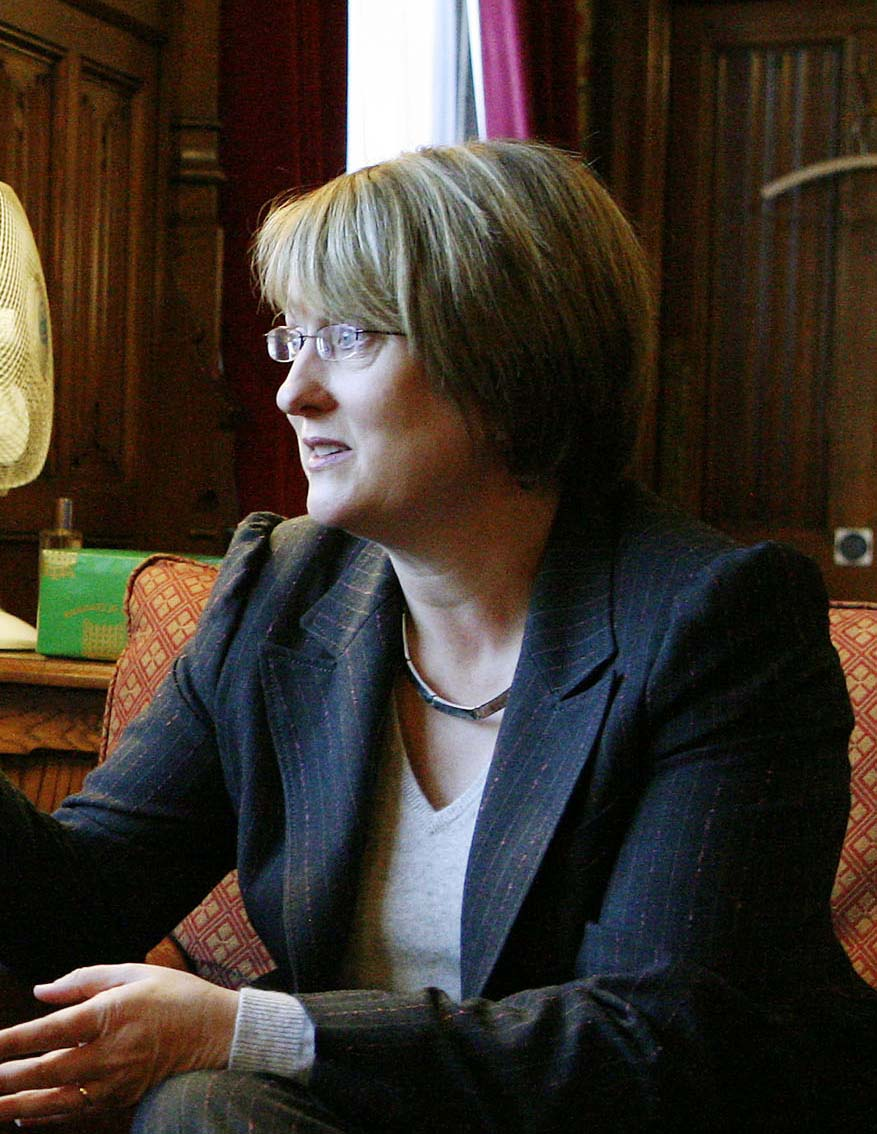
Former MP Jacqui Smith is an Honorary Professor in the Politics Department

The school appoints a number of honorary professors who share their real world expertise with students. For instance former Member of Parliament Jacqui Smith has given a number of talks to students studying British Politics and the British Parliament. As of 2015 they were:

- Major-General Tim Cross
- Ion Trewin
- Colin Jennings
- Sir Jeremy Greenstock
- Ted Cantle
- Sir Sherard Cowper-Coles
- Jacqui Smith
- Carolyn Quinn
- Michael Cockerell
- Paul Collins

=== Alumni ===
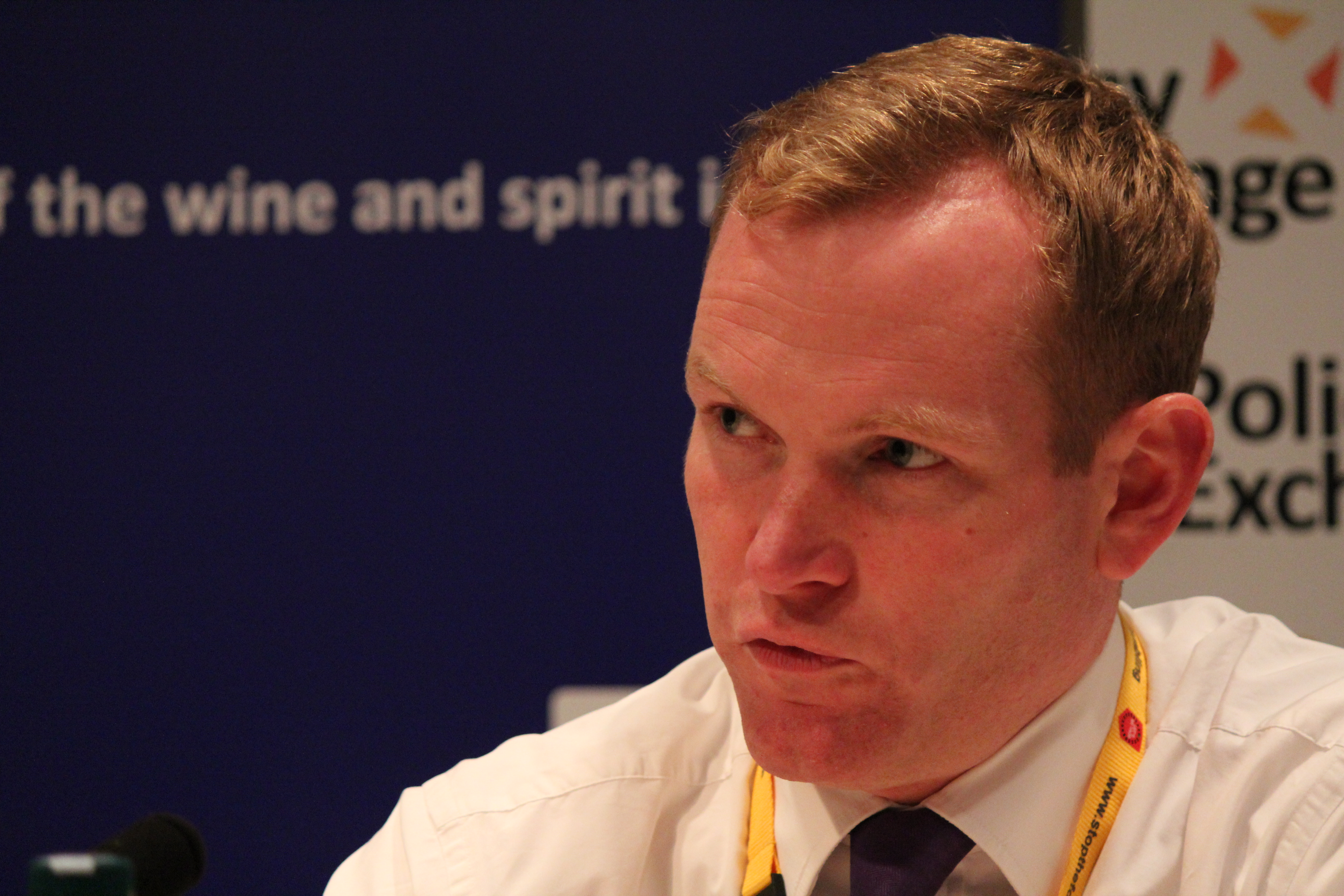
Jeremy Browne MP (pictured) graduated from Nottingham's Politics Department in 1992.

- Emma Barnett – broadcaster and journalist, former Women's editor of The Daily Telegraph
- Natalie Pinkham – TV presenter
- Louise Haigh - Labour MP for Sheffield Heeley and Secretary of State for Transport
- Kelvin Hopkins – Labour MP for Luton North
- Tom Copley- London Assembly Member. Spokesman for Housing
- Jeremy Browne – former Liberal Democrat Member of Parliament.
- Michael Dugher – former Labour Member of Parliament for Barnsley East.
