= The Silk Road: A New History =

2012 book by Valerie Hansen

- Cover (first edition, 2012)
- Author: Valerie Hansen
- Language: English
- Subject: Silk Road
- Genre: History
- Publisher: Oxford University Press
- Publication date: 2012
- Publication place: United States
- Media type: Print (hardcover)
- Pages: 304
- Awards: The Gustav Ranis International Book Prize
- ISBN: 978-0-19-515931-8
- OCLC: 757838314
- Dewey Decimal: 950.1
- LC Class: DS33.1.H36 2012

The Silk Road: A New History is a 2012 book by the American historian Valerie Hansen.

Working using documents and artifacts excavated at seven oasis settlements between Xi'an and Samarkand, Hansen reconstructs the history of the overland routes across Central Asia from about 200 to 1000 CE. She argues that the Silk Road was not a single road and that long-distance trade across it was small in scale, but rather that the main stimulus to the regional economy was the Chinese state's spending on its frontier garrisons, and that the routes mattered chiefly for the religions, languages, technologies, and art carried by migrants, monks, and envoys.

The book won the 2013 Gustav Ranis International Book Prize and was recognized by the International Convention of Asia Scholars as the best new book about Asia for teaching the humanities.

An expanded classroom edition, The Silk Road: A New History with Documents, appeared in 2017.

== Background ==
Hansen described the book's method as built on the French medieval historian Marc Bloch's distinction between "intentional" sources like chronicles, composed for posterity, and "non-intentional" sources, the ordinary records of daily life. She valued the latter because no one had edited them for later readers. The dry climate, she said, preserved wooden slips, recycled paper, and account books, the sort of material that survived nowhere else in Eurasia. Some of these had been deliberately buried by villagers who expected to return, but most lasted only because they were thrown away and then covered by sand.

Hansen organized the argument around three commodities: silk, coins, and paper. She challenged the older view, which she traced to the geographer Ferdinand von Richthofen, that Romans had bought Chinese silk with coins. Plain silk, she countered, often served as currency rather than as a luxury good. Paper, she argued, mattered more in the long run than silk did, a comparison she often put to student audiences as a question.

With scholars in China and elsewhere, Hansen had studied textiles as currency along the Silk Road, research that appeared as a 2013 special issue of the Journal of the Royal Asiatic Society. She leaned on the few specialists, ten in the world by her count, who could read Sogdian, a language closed to her. Many colleagues, she conceded, doubted her thesis that long-distance trade had been meager. She held to it, reasoning that the surviving record was copious enough to register a large trade, had one existed.

== Overview ==
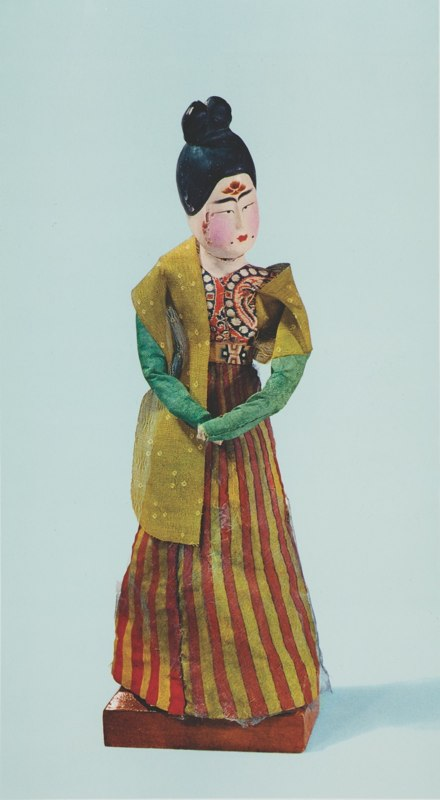
This 7th-century doll is nicknamed the "Tang Barbie".

Hansen traces the overland routes through Central Asia between China and the lands to its west, from about 200 to 1000 CE. Rather than a single highway carrying silk from China to Rome, she recasts the Silk Road as a shifting set of unmarked desert and mountain paths. The documented trade along them was mostly local and modest in scale. The book is based on manuscripts and everyday records: contracts, lawsuits, travel passes, tax receipts, private letters, and account books. Written in languages including Chinese, Kharoshthi Gandhari, Tocharian, Sogdian, Khotanese, Tibetan, and Uighur, these documents were recovered from tombs, garrisons, and refuse heaps where the dry climate of the Taklamakan Desert had preserved them. Many survived because paper was valuable, recycled into shoes, garments, and figurines for the dead, then reassembled by archaeologists. Because the records were not written as history, they name ordinary people (wives, slaves, moneylenders, parties to lawsuits) alongside the rulers and clergy who dominate other sources. Hansen interleaves this material with the narratives of the modern explorers who found it, among them Aurel Stein and Sven Hedin, and with the accounts of the Chinese Buddhist pilgrims Faxian and Xuanzang.

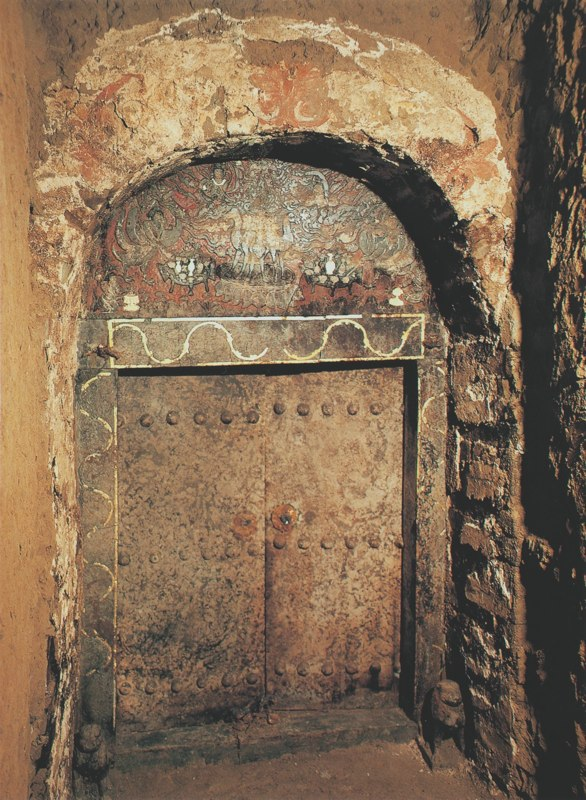
Sogdian stone tomb with Zoroastrian art

The book moves through seven oasis settlements in rough chronological order. The earliest are Niya and Loulan, in the kingdom of Kroraina, where migrants from Gandhara introduced the Kharoshthi script and Buddhism in the third and fourth centuries. At Kucha, home of the translator Kumarajiva and site of the Kizil caves, people spoke the languages later labeled Tocharian. Turfan's recycled-paper burials document daily life and the use of Iranian silver coins; at Samarkand, in Sogdiana, homeland of the Sogdian traders, the Sogdian Ancient Letters and the Mount Mugh documents record commerce, Zoroastrian belief, and the Arab conquest. Chang'an (modern Xi'an), the Tang capital and home to immigrant communities, yielded the gold and silver of the Hejiacun hoard. Dunhuang's sealed library cave held some forty thousand manuscripts. Khotan closes the sequence, the first of the region's kingdoms to convert to Islam, in 1006. In these cosmopolitan settlements, Buddhism, Zoroastrianism, Manichaeism, the Church of the East, and Judaism were practiced side by side, generally with mutual tolerance, until Islam spread after 1000.

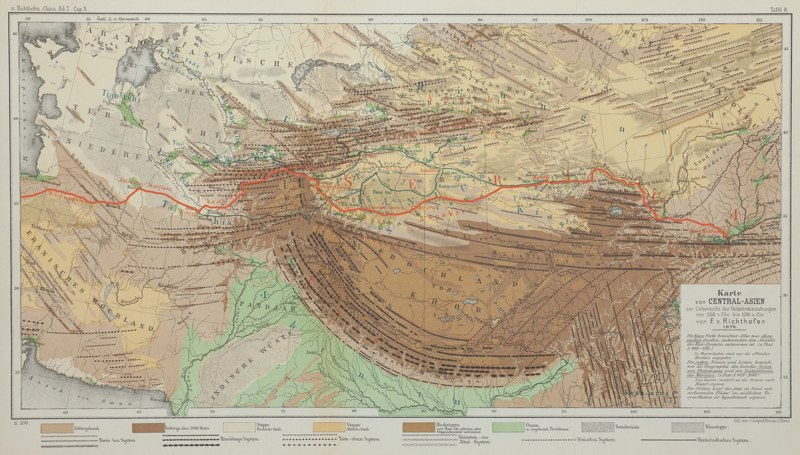
The term "Silk Road" first appeared on this 1877 map by German geographer Ferdinand von Richthofen.

Hansen makes two central claims. Long-distance commercial traffic was minimal: most exchange ran through local peddlers using grain, cloth, or coins as currency. The regional economy's largest stimulus came instead from the Chinese state, which paid its frontier garrisons in bolts of silk. Trade boomed when armies were present and collapsed once the payments stopped after the An Lushan rebellion of 755. The routes' lasting importance, the book holds, lay not in trade but in the transmission of religions, languages, artistic motifs, and technologies (paper above all), carried by refugees, monks, envoys, and artisans who settled far from home. Hansen calls the Silk Road "one of the least traveled routes in human history," yet "one of the most transformative super highways in human history."

=== The 2017 edition ===
The 2017 edition, retitled The Silk Road: A New History with Documents, adds two things to the original text. The first is a companion set of more than fifty translated primary sources, placed after the introduction and each chapter, so that readers can work directly with the explorers' reports, classical accounts, legal records, letters, religious texts, and account books that the narrative draws on. The second is a new eighth chapter, "A New Route Through the Grasslands," which extends the story past the year 1000 into the period of the Mongol Pax Mongolica. Hansen turns here to a more northerly steppe route across present-day Kazakhstan and Mongolia, separate from the Xinjiang oasis roads that occupy the rest of the book. She argues that the Mongol unification under Chinggis Khan in 1206 and the century of relative peace that followed made it possible, for the first time, for a single traveler to cross overland between Europe and China. The chapter follows the envoys, missionaries, and merchants who did so, among them John of Plano Carpini, William of Rubruck, the monk Rabban Bar Sauma, and Marco Polo, whose own route, she notes, in fact ran through Xinjiang rather than across the grasslands.

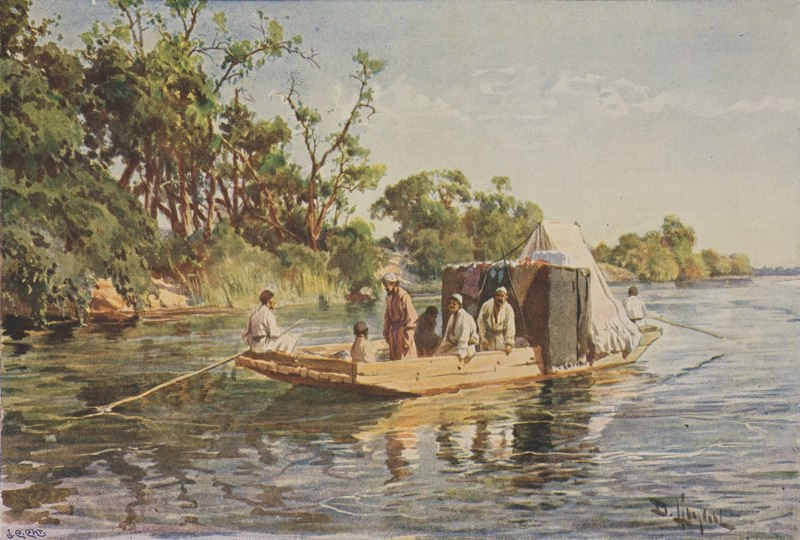

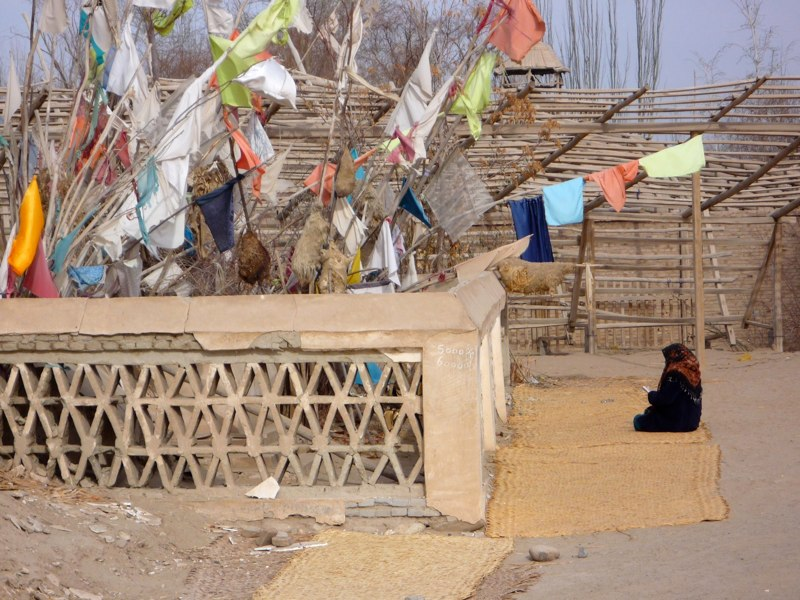

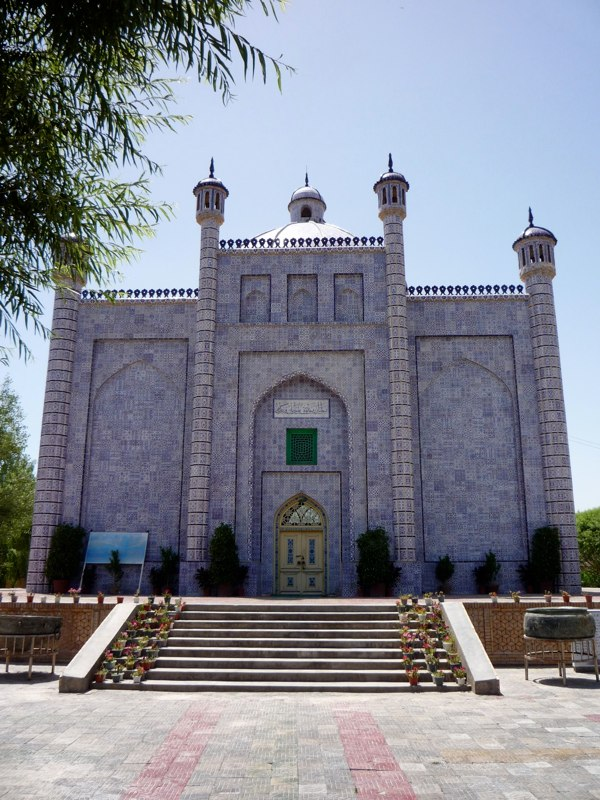

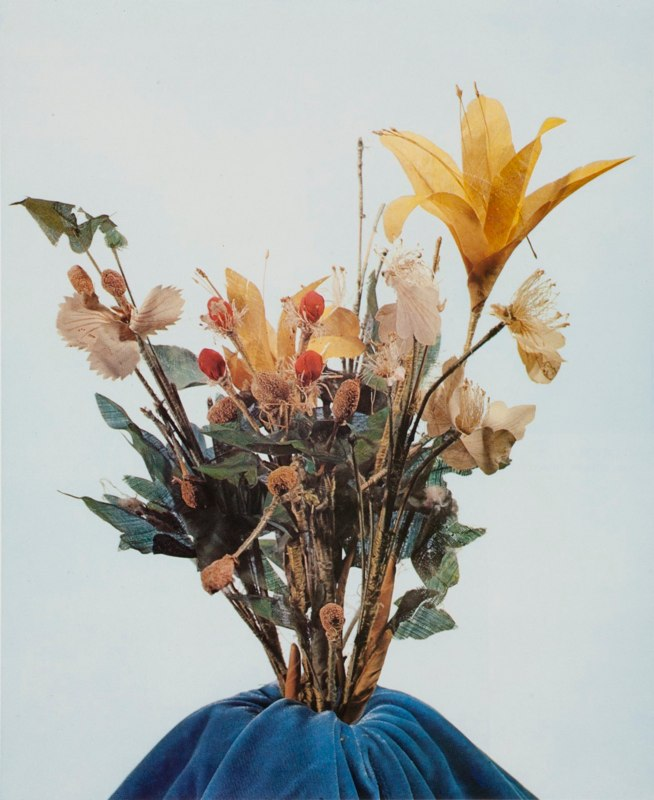

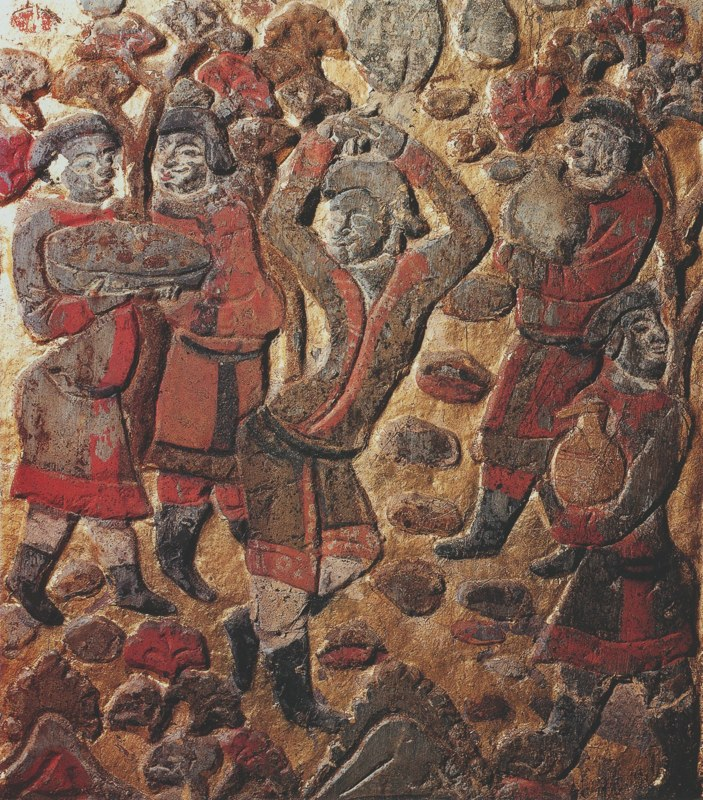

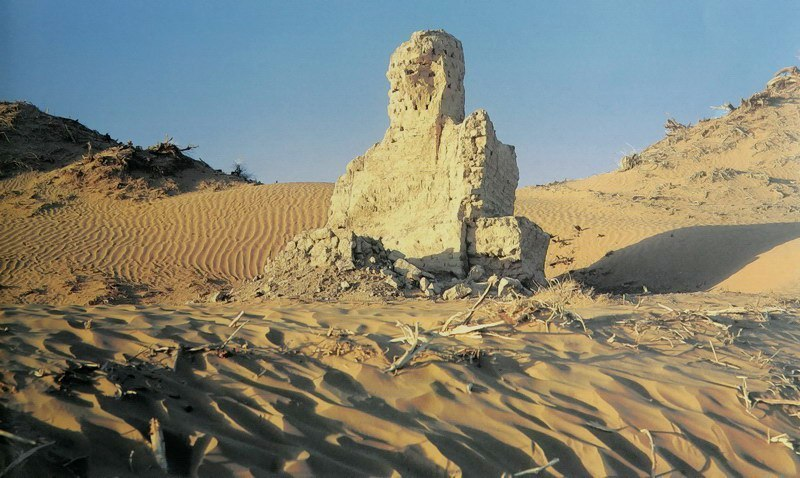

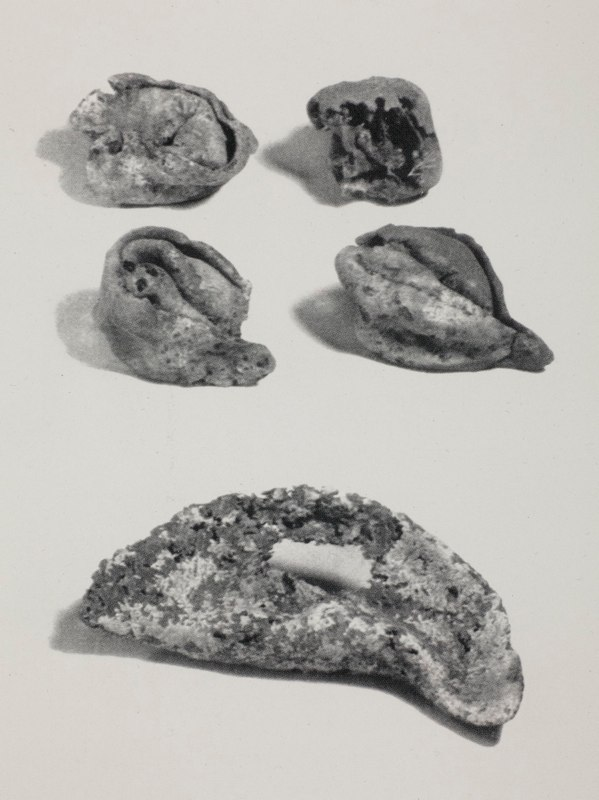

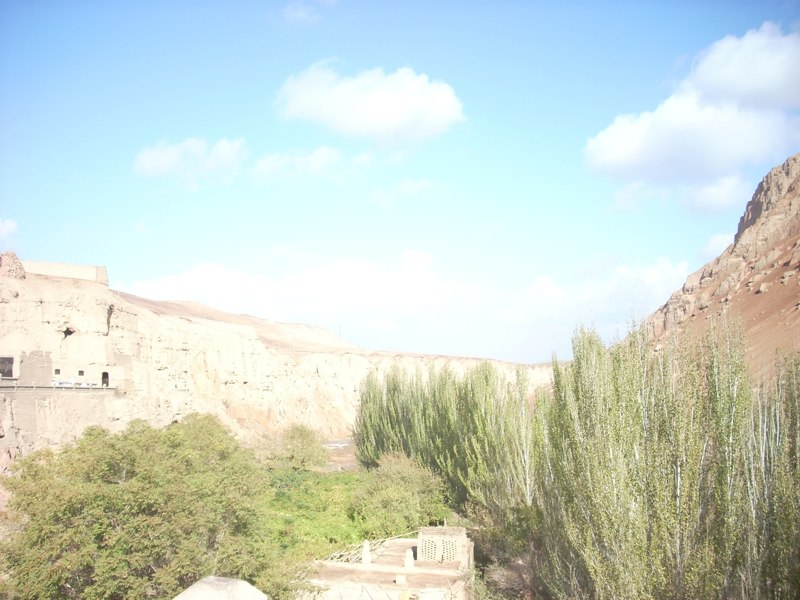

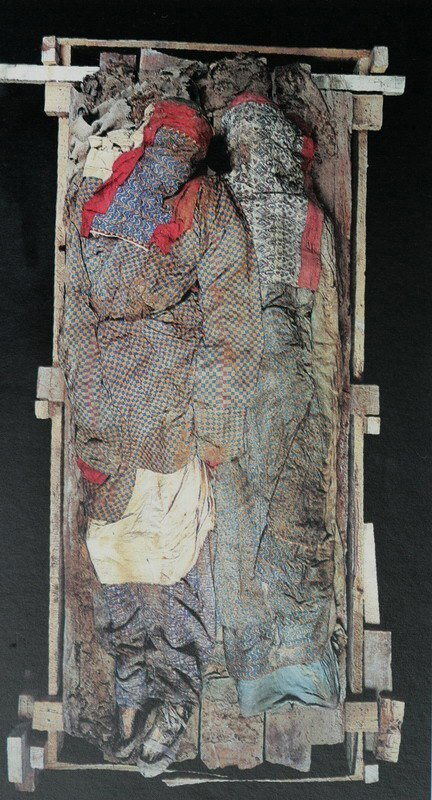

== Critical reception ==
Jonathan K. Skaff, Director of International Studies at Shippensburg University, described it as a much-needed and lucid synthesis of scholarship that would appeal to scholars, students, and general readers alike. He thought the clear prose, maps, and animated accounts of travelers and explorers would make the book a classroom favorite, and recommended it for all levels and libraries.

Johan Elverskog dismantled the work and presented it as defending two main arguments. He was skeptic about Hansen's first argument—that trade in Inner Asia was neither long-distance nor large in scale, but rather mostly local, trading locally sourced products often sold by peddlers. Yet, Elverskog agreed with the author's second argument about the role of the Chinese state as the true engine driving, developing, and sustaining the Inner Asian economy. This second argument "is fully supported by the evidence," wrote Elverskog, adding that it overlaps with Erik Zürcher's work. He described it as "beautifully written" presenting "a magisterial overview of Inner Asian history during the first millennium."

David Morgan found the argument "entirely persuasive" and warned that popular notions of the route "will certainly sustain quite a few knocks" from the book's findings. Morgan thought that the absence of Roman imperial coins in China "must be a significant pointer," highlighting Hansen's argument that the western terminus appeared to have been Persia rather than Rome. he thought that the author had not abolished the Silk Road but had shifted attention "from a singularly dubious notion of long-distance trade to a much more defensible concept of important cultural transmission across Asia." He added that the conclusions aligned with those of recent historians of the Mongol Empire, such as Thomas Allsen.

Charles Holcombe predicted that the volume would "become a standard source on the Silk Road for a long time to come." Holocombe thought that Hansen's conclusions are "securely and persuasively based on the available evidence, however unpopular they may be." However, he raised three doubts: that small-scale, short-distance trade might cumulatively outweigh occasional large governmental transactions, and that early Chinese written sources, produced by governments and disdainful elites, might underrepresent private commerce, and that the steppe and maritime routes might at times have rivaled the Xinjiang oasis route in importance. Holocombe also wondered why successive governments invested so heavily in a region they otherwise valued little, a question he felt was left inadequately explained.

In his review, Peter C. Perdue welcomed what he called a "no-nonsense approach" in which romantic tales gave way to the social life of seven oases. Perdue considered it "by far the most up to date, accurate, and readable account of the Silk Road available today" and "a remarkably important book." He predicted that aficionados of the Silk Road would savour it for years.

Xinru Liu, of the College of New Jersey, called it the first truly historical narrative of the subject set in the regional context of oasis Central Asia. Liu nonetheless registered two reservations: that treating Sogdiana as part of an Iranian cultural sphere was "a bit arbitrary," since the Sogdians dealt with nomads, Indians, and Byzantines as well, and that the role of the steppe nomads was almost absent from the account. These objections she considered as minor points in what was otherwise "a well-written and highly scholarly book."

Ruth Mostern called the book "a considerable addition to the historiography of the Silk Road" and an "essential reading for historians." However, she identified several shortcomings: the frame remained that of the Chinese frontier, with Persian, Indian, and European regimes appearing mainly insofar as they mattered to China, and the narrative tapered off after the eleventh century. Even so, Mostern ranked it among the books of Silk Road history that she most admired.

Joshua J. Mark found the narrative "clear and engaging" and the detail "fascinating," and said that whether a reader had extensive knowledge of the ancient world or was only beginning, the work was "an excellent resource."

In her review, Akshata Nair described the study as meticulously researched. Nair found the reconstruction of the route "convincing," while thought that some claims, such as migration in groups of a few hundred at a time, remained subject to academic debate. For her, the book served as "a succinct introductory crash course" on Silk Road history for scholars, students, and general readers alike.

== Awards ==
- Winner of the IBP Reading Committee Teaching Tool Accolade in the Humanities of the International Convention of Asia Scholars
- Winner of the Gustav Ranis International Book Prize (2013)
