= Steve Tsang =

Hong Kong-born historian and political scientist (born 1959)

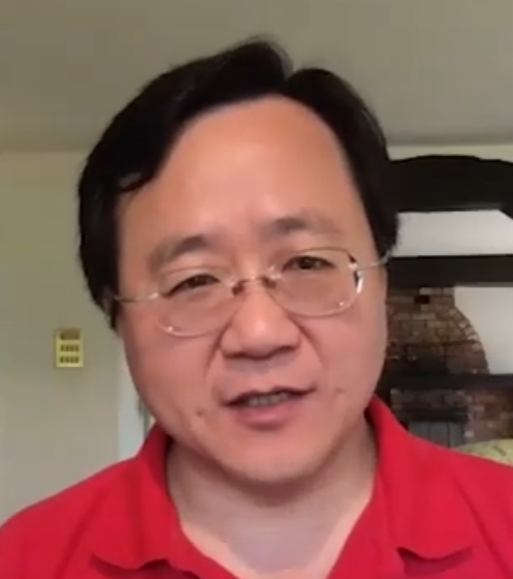
- In a Lowy Institute online discussion in 2021
- Born: 1959 (age 66–67); British Hong Kong
- Education: University of Hong Kong; University of Oxford
- Occupation: Professor
- Employer: SOAS University of London
- Spouse: Rhiannon Jenkins

Chinese name
- Traditional Chinese: 曾銳生
- Simplified Chinese: 曾锐生
Transcriptions
Standard Mandarin
- Hanyu Pinyin: Zēng Ruìshēng
Yue: Cantonese
- Jyutping: Cang^{4} Jeoi^{6}-saang^{1}

Steve Tsang (born Tsang Yui-sang in 1959) is a Hong Kong-born political scientist and historian whose expertise includes politics and governance in China, Taiwan and Hong Kong, the foreign and security policies of China and Taiwan, and peace and security in East Asia. He is the current director of the SOAS China Institute at the SOAS University of London.

== Early life and education ==
Born in British Hong Kong, Tsang received a B.A. at the University of Hong Kong in 1981 and D.Phil. at St Antony's College, Oxford in 1986.

== Career ==
In September 2016, Tsang was announced as the new director of the SOAS China Institute, part of the School of Oriental and African Studies (SOAS), University of London, a role he began in December 2016. Tsang was previously a professor of contemporary Chinese studies at the University of Nottingham, where he also served as Head of the School of Contemporary Chinese Studies (2014–2016) and director of the China Policy Institute (2011–2014). Before joining the University of Nottingham, he spent his career at the University of Oxford, where among other positions, he served as director of the Pluscarden Programme for the Study of Global Terrorism and Intelligence (2005–2011), Dean of St Antony's College (2002, 1996–98), director of the Taiwan Studies Programme (2001–2011), director of the Asian Studies Centre (1997–2003), and director of the Oxford University Hong Kong Project (1987–1994).

Tsang's books include Taiwan's Impact on China (2017) and China in the Xi Jinping Era (2016). The last British Hong Kong governor, Chris Patten, described A Modern History of Hong Kong (2004) as "authoritative and well-researched". He is also the author of Governing Hong Kong: Administrative Officers from the 19th Century to the Hand-over of China, 1862–1997 (London: I.B. Tauris, 2007); The Cold War's Odd Couple: The Unintended Partnership between the Republic of China and the United Kingdom, 1950–1958 (London: I.B. Tauris, 2006); Hong Kong: An Appointment with China (London: I.B. Tauris, 1997); Democracy Shelved: Great Britain, China and Attempts at Constitutional Reform in Hong Kong (Oxford University Press, 1998). He is the author of numerous articles in refereed journals, including "Chiang Kai-shek's 'secret deal' at Xian and the start of the Sino-Japanese War"; "The U.S. Military and American Commitment to Taiwan's Security"; "Ma Ying-jeou's re-election: implications for Taiwan and East Asia", and "Consultative Leninism: China's new political framework".

Tsang is an associate fellow at Chatham House, associate editor of Palgrave Communications (2014–), serves on the editorial advisory board for several academic journals and was editor of the Nottingham China Policy Institute Series for Palgrave Macmillan (2011–2017). He regularly contributes to public debates on issues related to the politics, history, and development of East Asia, particularly China, Hong Kong, and Taiwan. He is a frequent commentator in print media and on television and radio, particularly the BBC, where he has appeared on Newsnight, BBC News at Ten, World News, BBC News, News 24, The Talk Show, Today, PM, Newshour, What If, and various World Service programmes in English, Mandarin, and Cantonese. His op-ed contributions have appeared in The New York Times, Foreign Policy magazine, Jane's Intelligence Review, Time, The Wall Street Journal, Forbes, South China Morning Post, China Daily, Taipei Times, The Straits Times, The Globe and Mail, Chicago Tribune, and the New Statesman amongst others. He has provided expert opinions to parliamentary committees in the British House of Commons, the European Parliament, and the United States Congress.

== Selected works ==
- Democracy Shelved: Great Britain, China and Attempts at Constitutional Reform in Hong Kong 1945‑1952 (Oxford University Press, 1988) ISBN 978-0-19-584175-6
- Hong Kong: An Appointment with China (London: I. B. Tauris, 1997) ISBN 978-1-86064-311-8 – Choice's Outstanding Academic Book for 1998
- A Modern History of Hong Kong (London: I.B. Tauris, 2004) ISBN 978-1-84511-419-0
- The Cold War's Odd Couple: The Unintended Partnership between the Republic of China and the United Kingdom, 1950–1958] (London: I.B. Tauris, 2006) ISBN 978-1-85043-842-7
- Governing Hong Kong: Administrative Officers from the 19th Century to the Hand-over to China, 1862–1997 (London: I.B. Tauris, 2007) ISBN 978-1-84511-525-8 (Chinese edition published by Hong Kong University Press)
- The Political Thought of Xi Jinping, with Olivia Cheung (Oxford University Press, 2024) ISBN 978-0-19-768936-3
- China's Global Stratgey Under Xi Jinping, with Olivia Cheung (Oxford University Press, 2026). ISBN 978-0-19-782881-6

== Personal life ==
Tsang is married to British writer Rhiannon Jenkins. They studied at Oxford University but did not meet until years later in a seminar on the 1997 handover of Hong Kong.
