= Turkish Policy Quarterly =

Istanbul-based quarterly magazine

Transatlantic Policy Quarterly
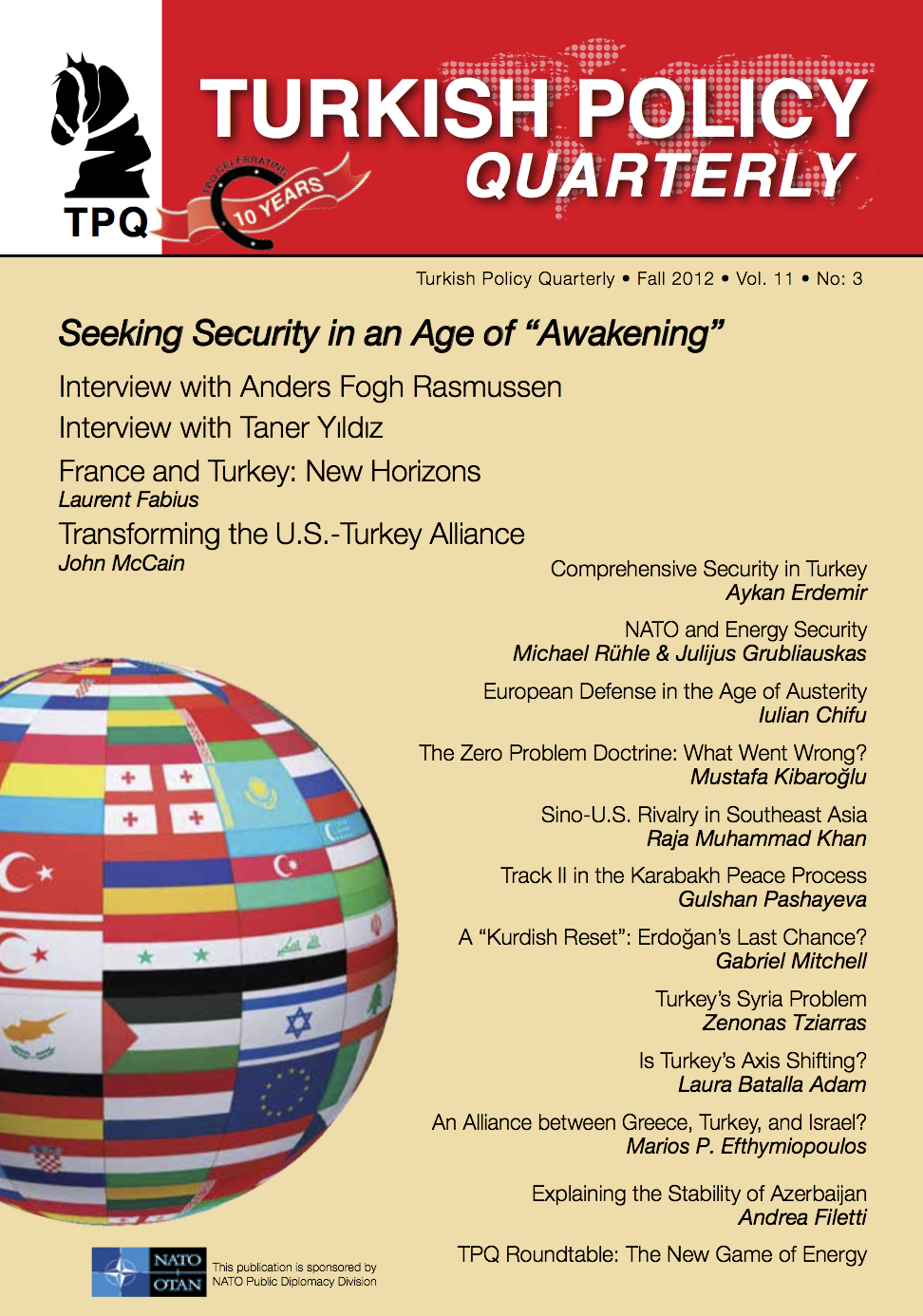
- Fall 2012 cover of Turkish Policy Quarterly
- Editor-in-chief: Ayşegül Erdem Ventura
- Categories: Foreign affairs
- Frequency: Quarterly
- Publisher: Kemal Köprülü
- First issue: 2002
- Country: Turkey
- Based in: Istanbul
- Language: English
- Website: www.turkishpolicy.com
- ISSN: 1303-5754
- OCLC: 54684435

Turkish Policy Quarterly was an Istanbul-based quarterly magazine aiming to foster original thinking and constructive policy debates on Turkey and its neighborhood. It was established in 2002. It was rebranded as Transatlantic Policy Quarterly in April, 2022.

== Overview ==
The magazine has been included in EBSCO's online databases since 2007. Abbreviated versions of leading articles are published in Hürriyet Daily News. The magazine also translates abbreviated versions of selected articles into Turkish for reprint in various Turkish daily newspapers, as well as online news portals, such as ABHaber and EurActiv.

The magazine is financed by advertisements, subscriptions, and sales in bookstores, but also relies on in-kind support and volunteers. In addition, issue-based partnership has been pursued with various organizations such as NATO's Public Diplomacy Division (Summer 2004, Spring 2009, Spring 2010, Fall 2011, Fall 2012, Fall 2013), the EU Commission (Spring 2006), and the Friedrich Naumann Foundation (Spring 2011, Spring 2012).

== Roundtables ==
In addition to its publications, "Turkish Policy Quarterly Roundtable Meetings" are organized several times a year. They primarily aim to discuss articles of newly published issues and to evaluate recent developments in world politics. Between 2002 and 2006, most panel members consisted of contributors to the magazine. Since 2006, the round-tables have attracted the attention of prominent figures from politics, civil society, and the media as well.

Sponsors of the round-tables include the Konrad Adenauer Foundation, Friedrich Naumann Foundation, German Marshall Fund of the United States–Black Sea Trust, Istanbul Bilgi University, and Kadir Has University.
