= International Quarterly for Asian Studies =

Academic journal

- Discipline: Asian Studies
- Language: English
- Edited by: Claudia Derichs

Publication details
- Former name: Internationales Asienforum
- History: 1970–present
- Publisher: Arnold Bergstraesser Institute (Germany)
- Frequency: Biannually
- Open access: Yes
- License: CC BY-NC-ND 4.0

Standard abbreviations
- ISO 4: Int. Q. Asian Stud.

Indexing
- ISSN: 2566-686X (print); 2566-6878 (web)
- OCLC no.: 1018650357
- Internationales Asienforum: IQAS
- ISSN: 0020-9449
- Internationales Asienforum: IQAS
- ISSN: 2365-0117

Links
- Journal homepage; Online access; Online archives

The International Quarterly for Asian Studies is a biannual peer-reviewed open access academic journal published since 1970 by the Arnold Bergstraesser Institute (Freiburg, Germany). Until 2016 its title was Internationales Asienforum. The journal covers research on issues related to political, ecological, economic, and socio-cultural questions in Asia as well as on Asia's role within the international system.

== Abstracting and indexing ==
The journal is abstracted and indexed in (under the name Internationales Asienforum):

- ATLA Religion Database
- EBSCO databases
- International Bibliography of Periodical Literature
- International Bibliography of the Social Sciences
- Modern Language Association Database
- ProQuest databases

== History ==
The journal was established in 1970 by Detlev Kantowsky (University of Konstanz) and Alois Graf von Waldburg-Zeil (Weltforum Verlag) as the Internationales Asienforum. Kantowsky was the founding editor until he was succeeded by Ekkehard Kulke. Clemens Jürgenmeyer was named editor after the death of Kulke in 1978. In 2010, Jakob Rösel (University of Rostock) became editor. After five years, he was succeeded by Claudia Derichs (Humboldt University). Since then the journal has become an English-only, open access journal and its title was subsequently changed to the current one in 2017.
