= Lois McNay =

British political theorist and academic

Lois McNay is a British political theorist and academic. She is Professor of the Theory of Politics in the Department of Politics and International Relations at the University of Oxford, and a Shirley Williams Fellow, Tutor in Politics, and Vice-Principal of Somerville College, Oxford. McNay is known for her contributions to contemporary political theory, feminist theory, and critical theory, particularly in relation to the work of Michel Foucault, Pierre Bourdieu, and the Frankfurt School.

== Education and career ==
McNay completed her BA and MA at the University of Sussex and earned her PhD at the University of Cambridge. Before joining Oxford, she held academic posts at the University of Kent and the University of Essex.

At Oxford, she teaches political theory with a focus on feminist thought, critical theory, and continental philosophy. She is a Professor in the Department of Politics and International Relations and has served in leadership roles at Somerville College, Oxford, including as Vice-Principal and Shirley Williams Fellow. She is also a member of the editorial boards of academic journals such as Constellations and the European Journal of Political Theory.

== Research ==
McNay's research engages with the intersections of feminist theory, social theory, and political critique. Her work is especially concerned with subjectivity, embodiment, power, and the experiential basis of critique. She has contributed to debates on the limitations of recognition theory, the inadequacies of abstract democratic theory, and the importance of grounding critical theory in lived experience.

She has written extensively on theorists such as Michel Foucault, Pierre Bourdieu, Judith Butler, Nancy Fraser, and Axel Honneth, and is noted for her critique of approaches that fail to address structural inequality and social marginalisation.

== Selected works ==
=== Monographs ===
- Foucault and Feminism: Power, Gender and the Self (Polity Press, 1992)
- Gender and Agency: Reconfiguring the Subject in Feminist and Social Theory (Polity Press, 2000)
- Against Recognition (Polity Press, 2007)
- The Misguided Search for the Political: Social Weightlessness in Radical Democratic Theory (Polity Press, 2014)
- The Gender of Critical Theory: On the Experiential Grounds of Critique (Oxford University Press, 2022)

=== Selected articles and chapters ===
- “The politics of welfare: between redistribution and recognition,” European Journal of Political Theory (2023)
- “Ontology and critique: the enigma of revolutionary subjectivity,” Contemporary Political Theory (2017)
- “Suffering, silence and social weightlessness: Honneth and Bourdieu on embodiment and power,” in Embodied Selves (2013)

== Public engagement ==
In 2022, McNay was interviewed by the Oxford Political Review to discuss her book The Gender of Critical Theory and the role of gender and embodied experience in shaping the future of critique.

== See also ==
- Critical theory
- Feminist political theory
- Recognition (sociology)
- Pierre Bourdieu
